= Esco =

Esco or ESCO may refer to:

== Places ==
- Esco, Kentucky, an unincorporated community in the US
- Escó, a village in Spain
- Escos, a commune in France

== Organizations ==
- Ulefos Esco, a Norwegian valve and hydrant manufacturer
- Energy service company or energy savings company (ESCO or ESCo)
- ESCO Corporation, a manufacturer of engineered metal parts and components
- ESCO Foundation for Palestine, a private family foundation set up in 1940
- Esco (Singaporean company) that develops, manufactures, and sells products and services for laboratories
- Estonian Shipping Company, a Soviet Union- (and later Estonia-) based shipping company
- Esco Trading, an arcade game company founded by Hayao Nakayama in 1967 and purchased by Sega in 1979

== Other uses ==
- Esco (name)
- ESCO - European Skills, Competences, Qualifications and Occupations, a multilingual classification of identifies and categorises skills, competences, qualifications and occupations relevant for the EU labour market and education
- eSCO, a Bluetooth protocol for transmitting voice data
- ESCO1, or establishment of sister chromatid cohesion N-acetyltransferase 1, a protein that in humans is encoded by the ESCO1 gene
- ESCO2, an enzyme that in humans is encoded by the ESCO2 gene

== See also ==
- Escondido, California, a city in California, US
