= Vertiv =

American industrial company

Vertiv Holdings Co.
- Formerly: Capitol Refrigeration Industries (1946–1965); Liebert Corporation (1965–2000); Emerson Network Power (2000–2016)
- Type: Public
- Traded as: NYSE: VRT (Class A); S&P 500 component
- Industry: Electrical equipment
- Founded: 2016; 10 years ago
- Founder: Ralph Liebert
- Headquarters: Westerville, Ohio, U.S.
- Area served: Worldwide
- Key people: David M. Cote (chairman); Giordano Albertazzi (CEO)
- Products: Critical power systems, uninterruptible power supply (UPS) systems, power distribution units (PDUs), thermal management, data center infrastructure management, service and site operations
- Revenue: ▲US$10.2 billion (2025)
- Operating income: ▲US$1.83 billion (2025)
- Net income: ▲US$1.33 billion (2025)
- Total assets: ▲US$12.2 billion (2025)
- Total equity: ▲US$3.94 billion (2025)
- Number of employees: c. 34,000 (2025)
- Website: vertiv.com

Vertiv Holdings Co. is an American provider of infrastructure and services for data centers, communication networks, and commercial and industrial environments. Headquartered in Westerville, Ohio, Vertiv has around 34,000 employees worldwide, operating in more than 40 countries and with 30 manufacturing and assembly facilities.

The company has regional headquarters in: Neuhausen am Rheinfall, Switzerland; Nanshan District, Shenzhen, China; Singapore; and Thane, Maharashtra India.

== History ==
=== 1946–1965: Capitol Refrigeration Industries ===
Vertiv began as Capitol Refrigeration Industries, established in 1946 by Ralph Liebert (1918-1984) in Columbus, Ohio. Liebert developed the first prototype precision air conditioner in his garage. In early 1965, the prototype was introduced to IBM in Chicago. Recognising the machine's potential, IBM arranged for Liebert to debut his invention at the World Computer Conference in Philadelphia.

=== 1965–2000: Liebert Corporation ===
Liebert Corporation was formed in 1965 with five associates as the industry's first manufacturer of computer room air conditioning (CRAC) systems. Two years later, in 1967, Liebert made its first international move by establishing a Canadian distributor network. In 1968, the company moved into a new facility in Worthington, Ohio. As its business continued to grow, the company broke ground once again and moved into a 150,000 square foot facility in Columbus, Ohio. In 1977, Liebert launched Conditioned Power Corporation to design and manufacture power distribution, conditioning and monitoring systems for the data processing industry.

Expansion continued as Liebert broke ground for a second major manufacturing facility in Delaware, Ohio, in 1980. Ralph Liebert's son, Larry Liebert, took over the company as president in 1980 and served in this position until 1989. In 1981, Liebert became a public company, listed on the NASDAQ under the symbol LIEB. In 1983, Liebert acquired Franklin Electric subsidiary, Programmed Power Corporation, expanding the company's power division capabilities to include the design and manufacture of uninterruptible power supplies (UPS). That same year, Liebert opened its first overseas production facility in Cork, Ireland. Liebert Corporation was acquired by Emerson Electric in March 1987, remaining a wholly owned subsidiary of Emerson.

=== 2000–2016: Emerson Network Power ===
In 2000, Emerson formed its Network Power (ENP) business unit, consolidating critical infrastructure technologies under a single brand. In 2001, the company increased its presence in Asia with the purchase of Avansys and formation of ENP India. ENP expanded its telecom industry solutions with the 2004 acquisition of Marconi outside plant and power system. In 2006, ENP acquired Germany-based Knürr, a provider of enclosure systems. In 2007, the Energy Logic energy efficiency model was developed and released. Avocent and Chloride Group were acquired in 2009 and 2010 respectively.

=== 2016–present: Vertiv ===
In December 2016, Platinum Equity acquired the ENP business from Emerson Electric in a transaction valued in excess of $4 billion. The company was rebranded as Vertiv, and Emerson retained a subordinated equity stake. Vertiv launched as a stand-alone business and appointed Rob Johnson as chief executive officer.

In 2017, Vertiv sold its ASCO power switch business to Schneider Electric for $1.25 billion. The company made three acquisitions in 2018: Energy Labs, Geist and MEMS. Through a merger with a Goldman Sachs-led special purpose acquisition company, GS Acquisition Holdings, Vertiv became publicly traded on the New York Stock Exchange (NYSE: VRT) on February 10, 2020.

In 2021, Vertiv acquired E+I Engineering, a global provider of switchgear, busway and modular power solutions, for $1.8 billion. In 2023, Vertiv's share price increased 252%, outperforming all companies in the S&P 500 index.

In March 2026, the company was added to the S&P 500 under the Industrials GICS Sector. As of 2026, the company is also part of the Fortune 500 list (No. 416) and of the 2025 Forbes Global 2000 (No. 1,174).

== Acquisitions ==
Vertiv
Date	Company acquired	Country	Business	Reference
September 2026	King Environmental Services	(Republic of Ireland) Ireland	Fluid Management Services	
September 2026	UtilityInnovation Group	(United States) USA	Microgrid Solutions & Advanced Power Controls	
June 2026	ThermoKey	Italy	Heat Exchange Solutions	
April 2026	Strategic Thermal Labs	(United States) USA	Liquid Cooling Technology	
April 2026	BMarko Structures	(United States) USA	Prefabricated Modular Structures	
December 2025	PurgeRite	(United States) USA	Mechanical Flushing, Purging & Filtration Services	
August 2025	Waylay NV	Belgium	Generative AI Software	
August 2025	Great Lakes Data Racks & Cabinets	(United States) USA	Custom Rack Solutions	
December 2024	BiXin Energy	China	Centrifugal Chiller Technology	
December 2023	CoolTera Ltd	(United Kingdom) UK	Liquid Cooling Infrastructure Solutions	
November 2021	E+I Engineering	(Republic of Ireland) Ireland	Electrical Switchgear & Power Distribution Systems	
December 2018	MEMS Power Generation	(United Kingdom) UK	Temporary Power Solutions	
February 2018	Geist	(United States) USA	Rack Power Distribution Units (PDUs)	
January 2018	Energy Labs	(United States) USA	Air Handling Systems	

Emerson Network Power
Date	Company acquired	Country	Business	Reference
2013	Advanced Protection Technology	(United States) USA	Surge Protection	
2012	Avtron Loadbank	(United States) USA	Load Banks & Testing Systems	
2010	Chloride Group	(United Kingdom) UK	Industrial Power	
2009	Avocent	(United States) USA	IT Management	
2008	Aperture	(United States) USA	Data Center Infrastructure Management	
2007	Stratos	(United States) USA	Radio Frequency & Optical Subsystems	
2007	Motorola Embedded Computing	(United States) USA	Enclosure Systems	
2006	Knürr AG	Germany	Enclosure Systems	
2006	Artesyn	(United States) USA	Embedded Power Conversion Technologies	
2005	Cooligy	(United States) USA	Active Cooling Technology	
2005	Chloride Telecom Systems	France	Telecom Power Systems	
2004	Midwest Microwave	(United States) USA	Microwave Connectors & Components	
2004	Marconi	(United States) USA	Outside Plant & Power Systems	
2004	Albér	(United States) USA	Battery Monitoring	
2001	Avansys	China	Power Conversion	
2000	Jordan	(United States) USA	Telecommunications Equipment	
2000	Ericsson Energy Systems	Sweden	Telecom Power Supplies & Systems	

Liebert Corporation
Date	Company acquired	Country	Business	Reference
1998	Nortel APS	Canada	Power Supply Systems	
1998	Hiross	Italy	Precision Environmental Control & Monitoring	
1998	Firetrol	(United States) USA	Electric & Diesel Fire Pump Controllers	
1997	Edco	(United States) USA	Low-Voltage Surge Protection Devices	
1996	HVM	(United States) USA	High Voltage Maintenance Services	
1995	eti/ERS	(United States) USA	Electrical Engineering & Testing	
1990	Control Concepts	(United States) USA	Transient Voltage Surge Suppression (TVSS)	
1988	ASTEC Power	(United States) USA	AC-DC & DC-DC Power Supplies	
1983	Programmed Power Corporation	(United States) USA	Uninterruptible Power Supply (UPS)	

== Markets ==
Vertiv's primary customers are businesses across three main end markets: data centers, communication networks and commercial & industrial environments. Vertiv's principal offerings include:

- Infrastructure & solutions: AC and DC power management, thermal management, and integrated modular solutions.
- Integrated rack solutions: racks, single phase UPS, rack power distribution, rack thermal systems, configurable integrated solutions, hardware and software for managing IT equipment.
- Services & spares: preventative maintenance, acceptance testing, engineering and consulting, performance assessments, remote monitoring, training, spare parts, and critical digital infrastructure software. Vertiv has over 320 service centers and employs more than 5,000 service field engineers globally.

In 2025, the company received 62% of its revenue in the Americas; 20% from Asia–Pacific; and 18% from Europe, the Middle East and Africa.

=== Manufacturing facilities ===
Vertiv has manufacturing facilities located in Delaware, Ohio; Ironton, Ohio; Lincoln, Nebraska; Anderson, South Carolina; Pelzer, South Carolina; Tijuana, Mexicali, Monterrey, Reynosa, Letterkenny, Burnfoot, Campsie, Bologna, Tognana, Volyne, Rugvica, Nové Mesto nad Váhom, Ras Al Khaimah, Ambernath, Chakan, Pune, Mianyang, Jiangmen and Johor.

=== Research and development ===
Vertiv invests approximately 5% of sales into research and development. In 2025, Vertiv spent $441.7 million on research and development. Vertiv has approximately 3,000 registered patents and 1,900 registered trademarks.

=== Partnerships ===
In April 2021, Vertiv was announced as Founding Partner and Official Data Center Equipment Provider of Columbus Crew.

In May 2023, Vertiv was selected by Nvidia after securing a $5m grant from ARPA-E's COOLERCHIPS program. Their joint objective over the next three years is to address the challenge of cooling high-density compute by integrating direct liquid cooling and immersion cooling into a single system. Vertiv was selected for its expertise in heat rejection technology. In December 2023, Vertiv announced its collaboration with Intel to provide pumped two-phase (P2P) liquid cooling infrastructure for the Gaudi3 AI accelerator.

In March 2024, Vertiv joined the Nvidia Partner Network (NPN) as a Solution Advisor: Consultant partner. In June 2024, Vertiv entered a strategic technology partnership with Ballard Power Systems (NASDAQ: BLDP), a proton exchange membrane (PEM) fuel cell company, to develop hydrogen fuel cell backup power solutions for data centers and critical infrastructure, scalable from 200 kW to multiple megawatts. The partnership targets zero-carbon and low-carbon alternatives to conventional diesel backup generators and covers deployments in North America and Europe, the Middle East and Africa (EMEA).

In October 2024, Vertiv co-developed with Nvidia a complete 7-megawatt reference architecture for the Nvidia GB200 NVL72 platform, enabling customers to configure traditional data centers as AI factories. The reference design was released publicly at the OCP Summit.

In November 2024, Vertiv and Compass Datacenters announced a collaboration to develop a hybrid cooling solution capable of switching between air and liquid cooling to accommodate both conventional and high-density AI computing workloads. The initial units were scheduled for deployment at a Compass facility in the first quarter of 2025 as part of a multi-year supply arrangement.

In July 2025, Vertiv and Oklo Inc. (NYSE: OKLO), an advanced nuclear technology company, announced a collaboration to co-develop power and thermal management solutions for hyperscale and colocation data centers powered by steam and electricity from Oklo's small modular reactor (SMR) nuclear power plants. A pilot technology demonstration was planned for the initial Oklo Aurora powerhouse at Idaho National Laboratory.

In November 2025, Vertiv and Caterpillar Inc. (NYSE: CAT) announced a strategic collaboration to integrate Vertiv's power distribution and cooling systems with Caterpillar's and its subsidiary Solar Turbines' power generation and combined cooling, heat and power (CCHP) capabilities. The arrangement was intended to produce pre-engineered reference architectures for AI data center deployments in power-constrained environments.

In February 2026, Vertiv and Hut 8 Corp. (NASDAQ: HUT), an energy infrastructure company, announced a collaboration to integrate Vertiv's OneCore converged physical infrastructure into select Hut 8 data center projects, aimed at accelerating AI data center deployment schedules. In March 2026, Vertiv and Generate Capital, PBC, an infrastructure investment platform, announced a collaboration to deliver integrated power and cooling solutions for data centers in the United States under a "Bring Your Own Power & Cooling" (BYOP&C) model.

Also in March 2026, Vertiv announced its role in developing converged physical infrastructure designs for the Nvidia Vera Rubin DSX AI factory reference design, contributing simulation-ready digital power and cooling assets for Nvidia's data center design ecosystem. In June 2026, Vertiv introduced a production-grade digital twin for its SmartRun system integrated into the Nvidia Omniverse DSX Blueprint.

In April 2026, Vertiv and CPower Energy, a virtual power plant (VPP) platform operator, announced a collaboration integrating Vertiv's EnergyCore Grid battery energy storage system with CPower's platform to enable data centers to participate in grid demand response programs and improve interconnection timelines.

In June 2026, Vertiv signed a framework agreement with Edge-Serve, a Dubai-based data center developer; Integrated Roots Company Ltd. (IRCL), a Saudi Arabian construction contractor; and the Saudi Electricity Project Development Company (PDC), a subsidiary of Saudi Energy, to collaborate on data center infrastructure development across the Gulf Cooperation Council (GCC) region, including the United Arab Emirates and Saudi Arabia.

=== Competitors ===
Vertiv's competitors include Schneider Electric, Eaton, Legrand, Huawei, Delta Electronics, Stulz, Johnson Controls, and Socomec.

== Brands ==
Vertiv produces AC and DC power management products, switchgear and busbar products, thermal management products, integrated rack systems, and modular and management systems for monitoring and controlling digital infrastructure.

Vertiv's brands include:

- Albér (Battery Monitoring)
- Avocent (IT Management)
- E+I Engineering Group (Electrical Switchgear, Modular Power, Energy Management)
- Energy Labs (Commercial and Industrial Thermal)
- Geist (Rack PDU)
- Liebert (AC Power and Thermal)
- NetSure (DC Power)
- PowerBar (Busbar Trunking)

== Leadership ==
Giordano Albertazzi became Vertiv's Chief Executive Officer on January 1, 2023, following the departure of former CEO Rob Johnson.
