= Liebert Corporation =

Manufacturer of power, cooling and infrastructure management for server rooms

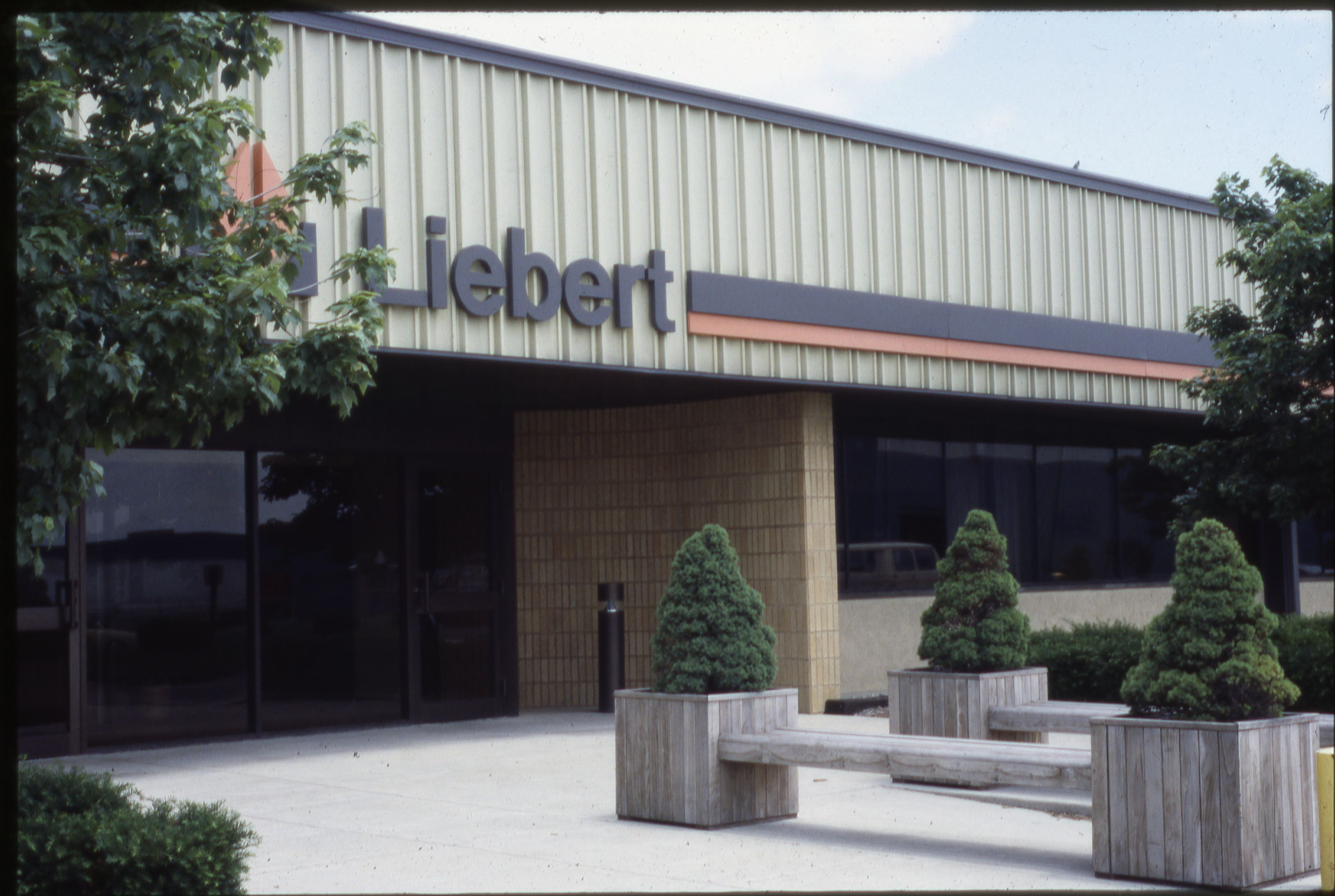
- Former headquarters in Columbus, Ohio
- Industry: Electrical equipment, HVAC
- Founded: 1965; 61 years ago
- Fate: Acquired by Emerson Electric, folded into Vertiv
- Headquarters: Westerville, Ohio, U.S.
- Number of employees: 1,500

Liebert Corporation, headquartered in Westerville, Ohio, produced electric power systems, precision cooling equipment, server racks and integrated cabinets, and related infrastructure management and services.

In 1987, it was acquired by Emerson Electric. In 2000, it was folded into Emerson Network Power, which became Vertiv in 2016.

== History ==
In 1946, Ralph C. Liebert (1918-1984) founded Capitol Refrigeration Industries, the precursor to Liebert Corporation. Liebert developed the first prototype precision air conditioner in his garage. In early 1965, the prototype was introduced to IBM in Chicago. Recognising the machine's potential, IBM arranged for Liebert to debut his invention at the World Computer Conference in Philadelphia.

In 1965, Liebert founded Liebert Corporation as the first manufacturer air conditioning units with temperature and humidity controls specific for computer room applications.

In 1977, Liebert launched Conditioned Power Corporation to design and manufacture power distribution, conditioning and monitoring systems for the data processing industry. The company remained a wholly owned subsidiary until 1981, when it became a division of Liebert Corporation upon the company's initial public offering.

In 1980, Liebert built a major manufacturing facility in Delaware, Ohio. That year, Ralph Liebert's son, Larry L. Liebert (1945-2023) took over management of the company.

In 1981, the company became a public company via an initial public offering on the NASDAQ.

In 1983, the company acquired Programmed Power Corporation from Franklin Electric. The acquisition expanded the capabilities of the company's power division to include the design and manufacture of uninterruptible power supplies. That year, the company also opened a plant in Cork, Ireland.

In 1985, the company organized its Liebert Global Services division and introduced SiteScan, its site management system.

In 1987, Liebert Corporation was acquired by Emerson Electric for $430 million in stock.

The company remained a subsidiary of Emerson until 2000, when the company consolidated its network and computer protection businesses to form its Emerson Network Power platform group.

In 2016, Platinum Equity acquired the division and renamed it as Vertiv.
