= Ilevo =

== Overview ==
Ilevo is a Swedish global company. In its early stage, the company was developed as a spin-off of Ericsson, with a focus on IP and telecommunication expertise.

== History ==
In 2003, Ilevo joined Schneider Electric and split its location, with a back office in Karlstad, Sweden and a front office in Grenoble, France. Today, the company has grown into a world specialist of PLC (Power Line Communication), a broadband communications technology (also known as BPL - Broadband over Power Line) using the power grids to support updated multimedia and energy services.
