= Compass Datacenters =

American multinational data center company

Compass Datacenters LLC
- Type: Private
- Industry: Internet
- Founded: 2011; 15 years ago
- Founder: Chris Crosby
- Headquarters: Dallas, Texas, US
- Owner: Independent (2011–2023); Ontario Teachers' Pension Plan (2023–present); Brookfield Infrastructure Partners (2023–present)
- Website: www.compassdatacenters.com

Compass Datacenters LLC Is an American multinational data center company. It is a significant player in the hyperscale computing space, with approximately 17 active datacenter campuses in the US, and internationally in Canada and Israel.

Since 2023, the company has been controlled by the private equity arms of Ontario Teachers' Pension Plan and Brookfield Infrastructure Partners.

Compass' partners include Schneider Electric, Cummins, Foster Fuels, Vertiv and Salute.

== History ==
Compass Datacenters was founded in 2011 by Chris Crosby, who previously was a senior vice president of Digital Realty with a focus on modular datacenters. In 2014, the company received a patent noting that they had created a truly modular datacenter.

Compass wholly owns a software-as-a-service company known as Radix IoT that specializes in datacenter management software.

Compass initially focused on US operations but eventually expanded abroad, specifically to Canada through the acquisition of ROOT datacenters in 2019 and to Israel directly through a partnership with Amazon Web Services. In the same time period Azrieli Group acquired a 20% stake in the organization. In 2023, the company acquired the former Sears HQ in Illinois to create a datacenter mega campus. On December 13, 2023, it was confirmed that the Compass Datacenters Prince William County project, one of the largest in the world, was set to go through after a 4–3 vote in favor of development.

On June 26, 2023, it was announced that Brookfield Infrastructure Partners and Ontario Teachers' Pension Plan had purchased the company.
