= Network UPS Tools =

Power system monitoring software

Network UPS Tools (NUT)
- Developers: Evgeny "Jim" Klimov; Arnaud Quette; Arjen de Korte; Charles Lepple; Numerous contributors (...)
- Release: March 8, 1998; 28 years ago
- Stable release: 2.8.5 / April 7, 2026; 5 months ago
- Written in: C
- Operating system: Cross-platform
- License: GPL
- Website: networkupstools.org
- Repository: github.com/networkupstools/nut

Network UPS Tools (NUT) is a suite of software component designed to monitor power devices, such as uninterruptible power supplies, power distribution units, solar controllers and servers power supply units. Many brands and models are supported and exposed via a network protocol and standardized interface.

It follows a three-tier model with dozens of NUT device driver daemons that communicate with power-related hardware devices over selected media using vendor-specific protocols, the NUT server upsd which represents the drivers on the network (defaulting to IANA registered port 3493/tcp) using the standardized NUT protocol, and NUT clients (running on same localhost as the server, or on remote systems) which can manage the power devices and query their power states and other metrics for any applications, usually ranging from historic graphing and graceful shutdowns to orchestrated power failover and virtual machine migration.

Based on NUT design and protocol, the project community authored "UPS management protocol", Informational RFC 9271, which was published by IETF in August 2022, and the IANA port number registry was updated to reflect it (even though this RFC is not formally an Internet Standard).

Clients maintained in the NUT codebase include upsc, upsrw and upscmd for command-line actions, upsmon for relatively simple monitoring and graceful shutdowns (considering the amount of minimally required vs. total available power source units in the current server), upssched for complex monitoring scenarios, upscgi for a simple web interface, a NUT-Monitor X11 desktop client, as well as C, C++ and Python libraries for third-party clients. Community projects include more clients and bindings for other languages.

Being a cross-platform project, NUT works on most Unix, BSD and Linux platforms with various system architectures, from embedded systems to venerable Solaris, HP-UX and AIX servers. There were also native Windows builds based on previous stable NUT release line, last being 2.6.5. This effort was revived after the NUT 2.8.0 release, becoming part of the main codebase in September 2022 (at this time there are areas of the codebase documented in the project as placeholders and not yet ported to the Windows platform, and packages are not yet produced by the project). As of NUT releases 2.8.1 to 2.8.3, NUT for Windows builds are available as archives from the CI platform, but neatly integrated packages are not yet available.

== History ==
Pavel Kořenský's original apcd provided the inspiration for pursuing the APC Smart-UPS protocol in 1996. This is the same software that Apcupsd derived from, according to the Debian maintainer of the latter.

Russell Kroll, the original NUT author and coordinator, released the initial package, named smartupstools, in 1998. The design already provided for two daemons, upsd (which serves data) and upsmon (which protects systems), a set of drivers and examples, a number of CGI modules and client integration, and a set of client CLI tools (upsc, upsrw and upscmd), for interfacing the system with a specific UPS of a given model. To reflect multi-vendor driver support, and to prevent potential quarrels with APC, the project name was changed to Network UPS Tools starting from 0.42.0, released October 31, 1999.

Arnaud Quette led the project since 2005, increasing its visibility to prospective contributors by creating a project on the Debian Alioth Forge, making it less dependent on one person. Working for MGE UPS Systems and later Eaton, he also ensured vendor collaboration in the worlds of UPS and embedded systems. As a result, many drivers for different protocols and media were developed, and many enterprise-style tools and software bindings were added to the project. Numerous drivers were redesigned into a more common framework, allowing for better codebase sharing.

Evgeny "Jim" Klimov, the current project leader since 2020, focuses first on automated testing and quality assurance of existing codebase to ensure minimal breakage introduced by new contributions, as well as to clean up older technical debts and inconsistencies highlighted by modern lint and coverage tools, and issuing a long-overdue new official release v2.8.0 ultimately on April 26, 2022.

The need to test NUT on many more platforms than typically offered by cloud CI projects based on market leaders (Debian/Ubuntu Linux, MacOS, Windows) led to a set of bespoke VMs and containers that were instantiated on different sponsoring cloud providers in different years, with a Jenkins-based NUT CI farm covering many of the less represented platforms. This also led to creation of a "jenkins-dynamatrix" Jenkins Shared Library to orchestrate a build-and-test matrix defined by currently active population of build agents declaring their platform capabilities; while currently its primary consumer is NUT, other projects with similar needs are welcome to adapt it to their needs. Thanks to this set-up, a typical iteration of NUT code base runs some 300 scenarios with different build and test targets, across numerous OS kernel technologies and distributions based on them, system library, compiler, shell and make program implementations, covering numerous branches of the past two decades of IT evolution -- actively ensuring all these systems are supported with each merged change set.

His later work focuses on guiding contributors of new drivers and other code, expanding compatibility with various operating systems, toolkit implementations and language revisions, as well as maintaining and documenting the possibility to build current NUT codebase wherever it worked in the past decades, with the motto "If those boxes still run, they deserve protection!"

There are also many efforts about quality-of-life improvements for end-users of NUT, such as OS service management framework integration, new command-line tool options, NUT programs' inter-communication features, tunability and openness to troubleshooting efforts. Of special note is the support for building NUT for in‐place upgrades or non‐disruptive tests, allowing end-users to try newer NUT code base than what their OS distribution packages deliver, while remaining as compatible to their layout and configuration as possible, so they can use the custom build as a drop-in replacement if they like it after prior testing from the build workspace.

Over its two-decade history, the open-source project became the de facto standard solution for UPS monitoring provided with OS distributions and embedded into many NAS solutions, some converged hypervisor set-ups, and other appliances, and enjoyed contributions and support from numerous end-users as well as representatives of power hardware vendors providing protocol specifications, sample hardware, and in many cases new NUT driver code and subsequent fixes based on NUT community feedback.
