= APC by Schneider Electric =

American electrical equipment manufacturer

- Formerly: American Power Conversion Corporation
- Type: Subsidiary
- Industry: Electrical equipment
- Founded: 1981; 45 years ago
- Headquarters: West Kingston, Rhode Island, United States
- Products: Uninterruptible power supplies, data center, servers, storage, software, services
- Revenue: $3.5 Billion (2007)
- Number of employees: 12,000 (2007)
- Parent: Schneider Electric
- Website: www.apc.com/us/en/

APC by Schneider Electric (formerly American Power Conversion Corporation) is a manufacturer of uninterruptible power supplies (UPS), electronics peripherals, and data center products.

In 2007, Schneider Electric acquired APC and combined it with MGE UPS Systems to form Schneider Electric's Critical Power & Cooling Services Business Unit, which recorded 2007 revenue of US$3.5 billion (EUR 2.4 billion) and employed 12,000 people worldwide. Until February 2007, when it was acquired, it had been a member of the S&P 500 list of the largest publicly traded companies in the United States.

Schneider Electric, with 113,900 employees and operations in 102 countries, had 2008 annual sales of $26 billion (EUR 18.3 billion).

In 2011, APC by Schneider Electric became a product brand only, while the company was rebranded as the IT Business Unit of Schneider Electric.

== History ==
APC was founded in 1981 by three MIT Lincoln Lab electronic power engineers. Originally, the engineers focused on solar power research and development. When government funding for their research ended, APC shifted its focus to power protection by introducing its first UPS in 1984.

=== Acquisition by Schneider ===
Schneider Electric announced its acquisition of APC on October 30, 2006 and completed it on February 14, 2007. APC shareholders approved the deal on January 16, 2007. The European Union authorized the merger, provided that Schneider divest itself of the MGE UPS SYSTEMS global UPS business below 10kVA. Late in 2007 Eaton Powerware bought the MGE Office Protection Systems division of Schneider.

== Product lines ==
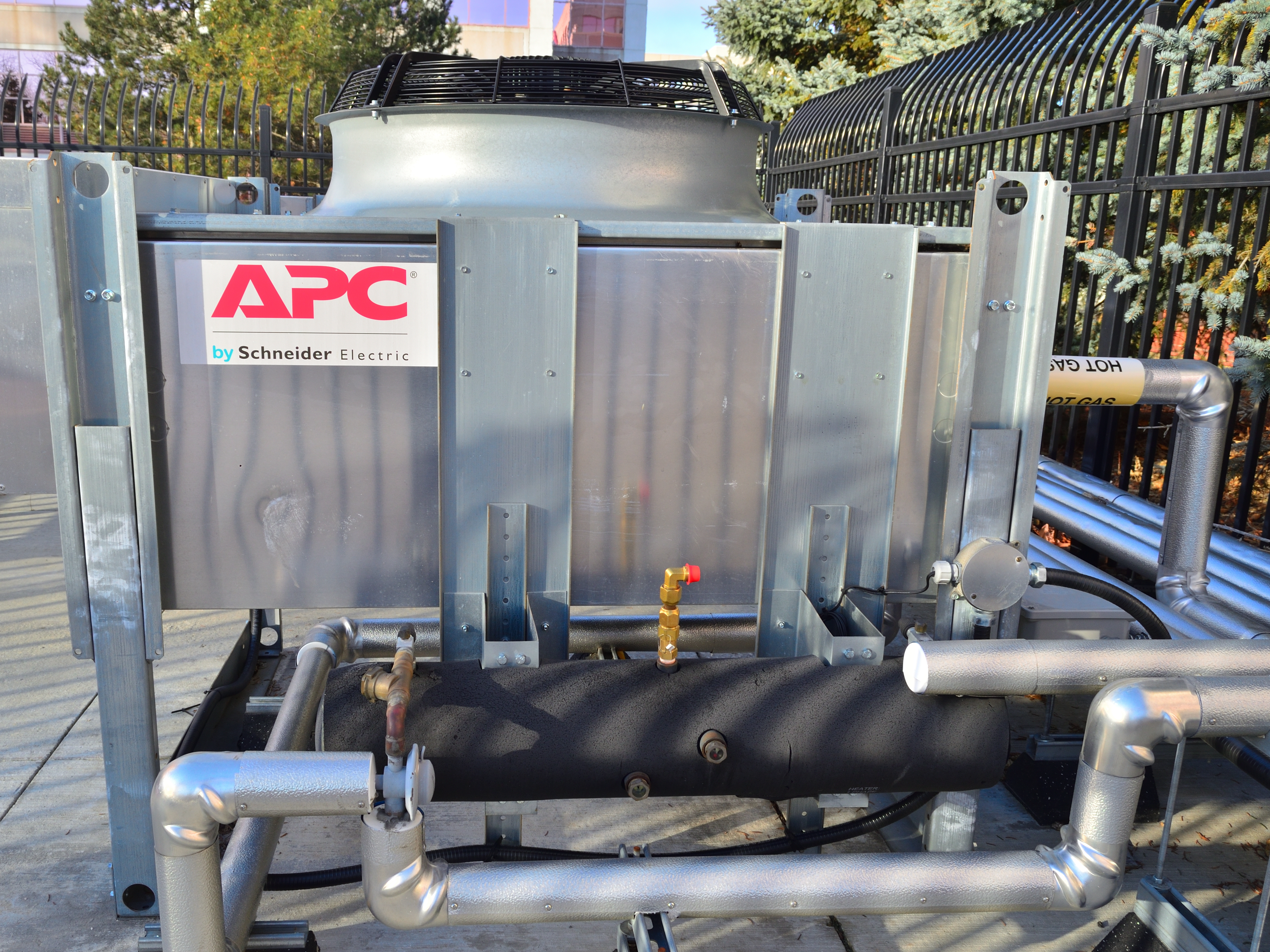
APC datacenter cooling

The company focuses its efforts on four application areas:

- Home/home office
- Business networks
- Access provider networks
- Data centers and facilities

=== Symmetra ===
APC Symmetra LX is a line of uninterruptible power supply products, aimed at network and server applications. Symmetras come in power configurations ranging from 4 kVA to 16 kVA. Symmetras are built for use in a data center (in a 19-inch rack for example). They include features such as integrated manageability, hot-swappability, user-replaceable power, and battery and intelligence modules.

=== Smart-UPS ===
APC Smart-UPS is a line of smaller units intended for home and office use, available as floor-standing and rackmount versions. With the exception of the Smart-UPS Online series (SURT and SRT models), Smart-UPS units are line-interactive UPS systems, running their outputs off the inverters only when the grid power is unavailable.

=== PowerChute ===
PowerChute is a computer program by APC designed to control and manage UPS systems. It facilitates unattended shutdown of servers and workstations during extended power outages and provides monitoring and logging of UPS status. Versions vary to cater to different user needs and environments.

PowerChute Business Edition requires servers to be connected via serial port or USB to the monitored Smart-UPS equipment. It provides UPS management and safe server shutdown for up to 25 servers. UPS Network Management Cards made by APC enable UPS management by directly connecting the UPS to the network with its own IP address, avoiding dependence or the need for a server, which can be useful in wiring closets where no servers are present. PowerChute Network Shutdown, together with the UPS Network Management Card, enables safe server shutdown by communicating over a network to any network-enabled APC Smart-UPS (those that contain a UPS network management card).

== See also ==
- Anderson Powerpole, a DC power connector used in APC products for attaching batteries
- Apcupsd, software daemon allowing multiple operating systems to connect to APC UPS units
- Smart Slot, a data interface used for attaching monitoring cards to APC products
