= The Global 100 =

Index

The Global 100 Index is an annual ranking of the world's most sustainable corporations. The list is published by Toronto-based media and research company, Corporate Knights (and announced each year during the World Economic Forum in Davos, Switzerland). From its inception in February 2005 to January 2022, the Global 100 index made a net investment return of 331%, compared to 279% from the MSCI All Country World Index (ACWI). The adoption of large green recovery programs in response to the COVID-19 pandemic is suspected to have widened this performance gap.

== History ==
The Global 100 was created by Corporate Knights magazine in 2005. The index was created with the intention of devising a methodology to quantitatively compare and rank the world's largest publicly traded companies. As a rules-based sustainability rating that emphasizes the impact of a company's core products and services, the Global 100 is the best-performing global sustainability index (ticker: CKG100).

== Methodology ==
The Global 100 uses a purely quantitative methodology to determine inclusion in the ranking. The Global 100 starting universe automatically considers all publicly listed companies with US$1B+ revenue during the rating year. The firms are screened for: a financially based Piotroski F-score to ensure financial stability, and fines, penalties or settlements paid out by the company for sustainability related violations. Companies involved in certain products or services and behaviours counterproductive to sustainable development are eliminated. The initial screening process culminates in the Global 100 shortlist. Companies are scored on up to 25 key performance indicators (KPIs), according to the companies’ Corporate Knights Peer Group (CKPG) classification and KPI Weighting System.

The 25 KPIs used to rank Global 100 companies include:

- Energy Productivity
- GHG Productivity
- Water Productivity
- Waste Productivity
- VOC Productivity
- NOx Productivity
- SOx Productivity
- Particulate Matter Productivity
- Sustainable Revenue
- Sustainable Investment
- Injuries
- Fatalities
- Percentage Tax Paid
- CEO to Average Worker Pay
- Pension Fund Quality
- Employee Turnover
- Sanction Deductions
- Paid Sick Leave
- Sustainability Pay Link
- Non-males in Executive Management
- Non-males on Boards
- Racial Diversity Among Executives
- Racial Diversity on Board of Directors
- Supplier Sustainability Score
- Political Influence

== Accolades ==
The Global 100 Index has been recognized as a leader in transparency and industry best practices for sustainability rankings, according to SustainAbility's Rate the Raters project.

== World's Most Sustainable Corporations ==
2022: Vestas Wind Systems

2021: Schneider Electric

2020: Ørsted

2019: Chr. Hansen Holding A/S

2018: Dassault Systèmes

2017: Siemens

2016: BMW

2015: Biogen

2014: Westpac

2013: Umicore

2012: Novo Nordisk

2011: Statoil ASA

2010: General Electric Company

== See also ==
- Corporate Knights
- Corporate social responsibility
- Dow Jones Sustainability Index
- FTSE4Good Index
- Green company
- Greenwashing
