= Apcupsd =

Software daemon allowing multiple operating systems to connect to APC UPS units

- Original author: Kern Sibbald
- Developer: Adam Kropelin
- Initial release: April 7, 2005; 20 years ago
- Stable release: 3.14.14 (May 31, 2016; 9 years ago) [±]
- Repository: sourceforge.net/projects/apcupsd/
- Written in: C++
- License: GPL
- Website: www.apcupsd.org

Apcupsd, short for APC UPS daemon, is a utility that runs on Linux, UNIX, macOS and Windows. It allows the computer to interact with APC UPSes. Apcupsd also works with some OEM-branded products (e.g. Hewlett-Packard) manufactured by APC.

Apcupsd is a free software equivalent of the APC's proprietary PowerChute software. As of version 3.14, Apcupsd has support for the PowerChute Network Shutdown function as well as many other features.

Apcupsd runs in daemon mode so to keep a live connection with the UPS. Depending on the settings and type of connection, Apcupsd either polls the UPS to learn about its current state, or receives messages from the UPS itself (e.g. via SNMP traps). Possible types of connections to the UPS are USB, RS-232 or Ethernet. Apcupsd can communicate with other instances of Apcupsd on other computers and maintain a client-server relationship with them. This way it is possible to power multiple computers with one UPS, even though only one of them is connected to the data port of the UPS.

== See also ==
- APC Smart-UPS
- Network UPS Tools, an alternative to Apcupsd, that supports some APC UPS
