= ASCO Power Technologies =

American electrical equipment manufacturer

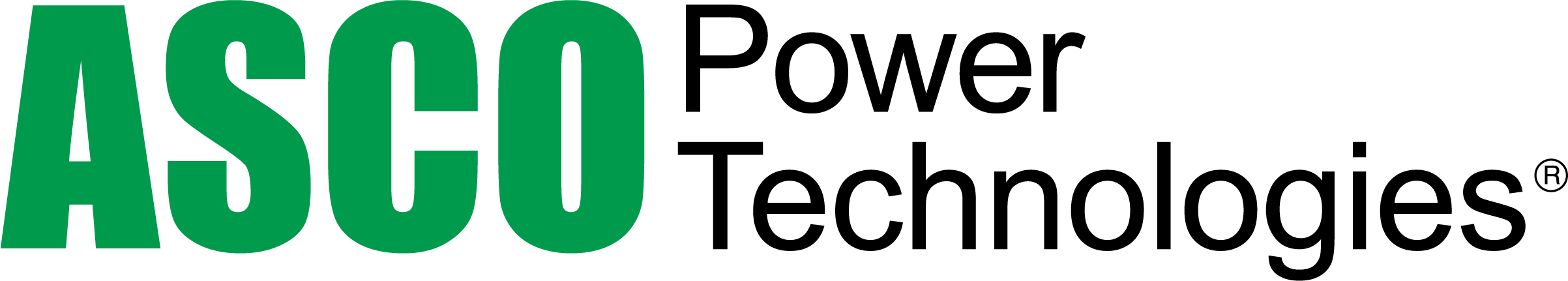
- Type: Subsidiary
- Industry: Electrical
- Founded: 1888; 138 years ago
- Headquarters: Florham Park, New Jersey, United States
- Products: Electrical power transfer switches, load banks, power control systems, paralleling switchgear, surge protective devices, fire pump controllers
- Number of employees: 1,400
- Parent: Schneider Electric
- Website: ascopower.com

ASCO (Automatic Switch Company) Power Technologies, is an American company that makes electrical equipment used in healthcare facilities, data centers, communication networks, commercial buildings, and industrial plants. It has been a business unit of Schneider Electric since 2017.

ASCO also includes a Services branch, providing maintenance programs, modifications, upgrades, and emergency repairs. The "Firetrol" branch of ASCO provides power transfer switches, controls, and alarms for fire suppression. ASCO's headquarters are located in Florham Park, New Jersey. As of 2020 the company had 1,400 employees and 500,000 square feet of manufacturing floor space, it was the world's largest manufacturer of power transfer switches.

ASCO Power Technologies was founded in 1888 and developed the first commercially available automatic transfer switch in 1920.

On November 1, 2017, ASCO Power Technologies was sold by Vertiv to Schneider Electric for $1.25 billion.

== History ==
The Automatic Switch Company was founded on September 5, 1888 in Baltimore, Maryland. Its products were automatic controls for elevators and generators, and pressure controls for pumps and compressors.

In 1904, the company moved to New York City. David H. Darrin was President and the sole owner. The Company under Mr. Darrin's leadership pioneered in the field of electromagnetic design. The mechanically held, electrically operated movement patented by David H. Darrin is still in use.

In 1938, Mr. Hurlburt redesigned the mechanically held movement which led to its use in remote control switches and transfer switches.

In January 1967, the company and its 575 employees moved to a brand new plant on 30 acres in Florham Park, New Jersey. The company continued to grow and in June 1966 it required substantial enlargement of the facilities in Florham Park. By this time the company employment exceeded 1,000.

In January 1973, the company acquired B-K Electrical Products Co., Inc. a manufacturer of electrical control equipment. In 1979, the company established ASCO Services, Inc., a wholly owned subsidiary, located in Florham Park. ASCO Services, Inc provided field repair and maintenance services to ASCO domestic customers who had purchased ASCO electrical control products. Similar field repair and maintenance services were provided to Canadian customers through Ascolectric Ltd. based in Brantford, Canada.

On May 17, 1985, the company was acquired by Emerson Electric Company, of St. Louis, Missouri.

On January 1, 1998, the Company acquired Firetrol, Inc., Cary, North Carolina, a manufacturer of electric and diesel fire pump controllers, jockey pump controllers and equipment for controlling and monitoring electric and diesel fire pump sprinkler systems. On November 1, 2006, ASCO expanded its manufacturing operations to Welcome, North Carolina. On October 1, 2011, ASCO obtains management of Liebert Surge Protection. Many of the Surge Protection products are manufactured in Reynosa in Mexico. On March 16, 2012, ASCO acquired Avtron Loadbank, Inc. Cleveland, OH, which includes N. J. Froment, Ltd., Easton-on-the-Hill Stamford, United Kingdom.

On October 31, 2017, ASCO Power Technologies was acquired by Schneider Electric.
