= Ora Collard =

American businessman and politician

Ora Marion Collard (September 17, 1902–April 11, 1961) was an American businessman and politician.

Collard was born in Norris City, Illinois. In 1904, Collard moved with his family to Herrin, Illinois, where he went to the Herrin public schools. He owned the Collard Heating and Air Conditioning Company in Herrin. He was on the Herrin City Council from 1937 to 1941 and was a Democrat. He was also an Illinois deputy fire marshal and the Williamson County deputy sheriff. Collard sat in the Illinois House of Representatives in 1949 and 1950. He died at his home in Herrin.
