= Ulefos Esco =

Norwegian valve and hydrant manufacturer

Esco Armaturfabrikk
- Formerly: E. Sunde & Co.
- Type: Aksjeselskap
- Industry: Manufacturing
- Founded: 1877
- Founder: Elias Sunde
- Headquarters: Kongsberg, Norway
- Products: Fire hydrants, valves, water-supply fittings
- Owner: Ulefos
- Website: ulefosesco.no

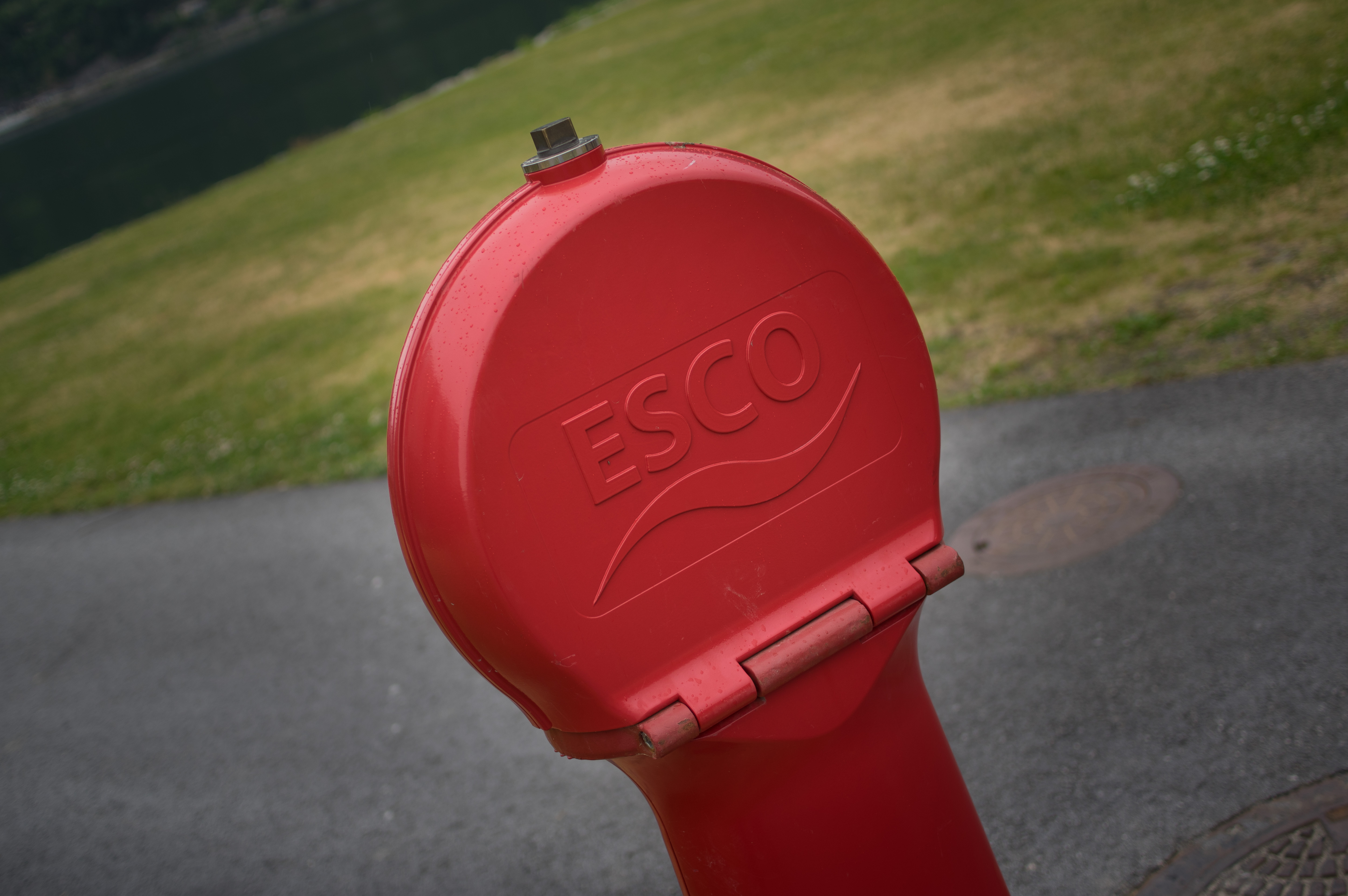
Ulefos Esco fire hydrant

Ulefos Esco is a Norwegian manufacturer founded in 1877 under the name E. Sunde & Co. in Oslo, particularly known for its red and green fire hydrants with the logo cast into the metal.

It was founded by the businessman and politician Elias Sunde (1851–1910), who served as finance minister and as director general of the Norwegian State Railways; the firm's name was later shortened to Esco, and the founder's initials E.S. were cast into thousands of fire hydrants across the country. In 1947 the production side was separated into a company named Esco Armaturfabrikk og Mekanisk Verksted, specializing in brass fittings for industry, shipping, and water supply.

In 1964 production moved to a modern factory in Kongsberg, aided by a fund established after the closure of the Kongsberg Silver Mines to stimulate new industry. The company was sold to the Swedish Tour & Andersson in 1979 (becoming TA-Esco), then to the Danish Danfoss in 1997, and the classic hydrant received the Norwegian Design Council's classic prize in 2004. After a local management buy-out in 2007 it became Kongsberg Esco, and in 2014 it was acquired by Ulefos, continuing as Ulefos Esco, Norway's only producer of water and sewage valves.
