= RIB Software =

German software company

RIB Software SE
- Company type: Ltd
- Industry: Computer software
- Founded: Stuttgart, Germany (1961)
- Headquarters: Stuttgart, Germany
- Key people: René Wolf (CEO)
- Products: Construction software & BIM software
- Number of employees: 2,600 (2024)
- Website: rib-software.com

RIB Software GmbH, headquartered in Stuttgart, Germany, provides construction and building information modeling (BIM) software to customers in the Architecture, Engineering, and Construction (AEC) industry. In 2020, it became a subsidiary of French multinational Schneider Electric.

RIB has subsidiaries in the EMEA, APAC and North America regions. In total, RIB has more than 20 branches worldwide.

== History ==
1961–1967: Founding

RIB was founded in 1961 by Volker Hahn, Fritz Leonhardt, F.W. Bornscheuer and six other employees at its headquarters in Stuttgart, Germany. With the IBM 1620 the systematic application of EDP for structural analysis begins.

1968–1978: Infrastructure & Structural Design

In 1968, RIB developed a program for the calculation of visibility on planned roads, and started to extend automatic drawing on other areas of construction work, like tunneling and hydraulic engineering. Shortly afterwards, the first finite element program (FEM) was applied in the German construction industry for plates, discs, and folding units.

1979

In 1979, RIB launched its first program system, IDEALOG for AVA and cost estimation. It was used for all public construction administrations of the federal and state governments.

Later, the programs for road construction and civil engineering are combined for structural engineering. RIB also developed software for tendering, awarding, accounting, calculation, and construction management.

2004–2010: International Expansion & Launch of iTWO

In 2004, RIB established an international R&D center in Guangzhou, China. At the end of 2009 and 2010, RIB opened 10 new regional offices, three in the USA, two in mainland China, and one each in Dubai, India, Singapore, Australia, and Hong Kong.

In October 2009, RIB introduced the German version of RIB iTWO, the English version of RIB iTWO was introduced in April 2010, and the Simplified Chinese version in July 2010.

2011–2016: IPO & iTWO World

On February 8, 2011, RIB Software AG shares were listed in the Prime Standard of the Frankfurt Stock Exchange. The issue price of the RIB share was €9.25.

In November 2013, RIB Software AG hosted the first iTWO World Conference in Hong Kong, China, which has been held annually since then and has established itself as an integral part of the iTWO community.

2017: Conversion into A European Company (SE)

On April 3 2017, RIB Software AG completed its conversion into a European Company (Societas Europaea/SE) and from then on traded under the name RIB Software SE.

2018–2019: Launch of MTWO

On April 20, at the Signing Ceremony of MTWO in Hong Kong, China, RIB, and Microsoft jointly announced that they would work together on a Proof of Concept of MTWO.

2020–Present: Takeover by Schneider Electric

In July 2020, the French group Schneider Electric announced a complete transaction of a public takeover offer for RIB with the offer of €29 per share. RIB was valued at €1.4 billion.

== Products ==
- RIB offers the following products:
- RIB Benchmark Benchmarking & Conceptual Estimating
- RIB BI+ Data Analytics & Business Intelligence
- RIB BuildSmart Cost Management & Enterprise Accounting
- RIB Candy Estimating, Planning & Project Control
- RIB Civil CAD Software for Civil Engineering
- RIB Connex Construction & Field Collaboration
- RIB CostX 2D & BIM Takeoff & Estimating
- RIB CX Intelligent Project Management Collaboration
- RIB Digital Handover O&M Data Handover
- RIB One Prefab Fully Integrated Production Workflow
- RIB Presto BIM-Integrated Estimating & Project Management
- RIB Project Document Management Collaboration
- RIB SpecLink Intelligent, Data-driven Specifications
- RIB SpecLive Project Specification Tracking Platform
- RIB 4.0 Integrated Project and Enterprise Platform or MTwo.

== Acquisitions ==
In 2012, RIB made three acquisitions: firstly, it purchased Memphis, Tennessee, United States-based estimating software business, MC². Secondly, on 30 September it announced that it had taken a majority stake in Sydney, Australia–based project management software company, ProjectCentre. Lastly, RIB acquired the controlling interest of U.S.COST in November.

In August 2013, RIB acquired a majority stake in Cosinus Informationssysteme GmbH, a provider of Microsoft Dynamics NAV.

In July 2014, RIB acquired Denmark-based SaaS construction collaboration technology provider Docia, and a 75% stake in Iceprice, provider of an E-Commerce platform for the building and construction industry.

In July 2015, RIB acquired Spanish construction software company Soft SA.

In February 2018, RIB acquired 100% of the shares of Exactal Group Limited, a Hong Kong-based software producer for the construction industry.

In November 2018, RIB acquired SaaSplaza, a global cloud Managed Service Provider (MSP) focusing on Microsoft technologies, with offices in Amsterdam, Munich, Toronto, San Diego, Shanghai, Singapore, and Sydney.

In April 2019, RIB acquired Datengut GmbH, a German mobile provider and Cadline Ltd, a British consultancy and IT service provider.

In June 2019, RIB acquired BSD, a US-based provider of construction specification data.

In July 2019, it acquired Construction Computer Software (CCS), a software provider in South Africa.

In August 2019, RIB made a strategic investment into Winjit, an IoT, AI, ML, and blockchain software provider, with offices in US, South Africa, and India. It also acquired CCS UK, a British distributor of CCSSA’s construction management software and Capricot, an Indian BIM technology provider.

In October 2019, RIB acquired Australian technology service provider Redstack Pty Ltd through subsidiary A2K Technologies. It also acquired German business intelligence company Datapine.

In November 2019, RIB acquired SoftTech Engineers Limited, an Indian software provider for automation of building permits.

In January 2020, RIB made an investment into VIM AEC, an American technology provider.

In June 2020, RIB made an investment into Bochaosoft, a Chinese electric power and engineering design software company, and acquired 51% stakes of Bochaosoft.

In July 2021, RIB acquired Levtech Ltd, a UAE-based IT consulting company.
