= William R. Tonso =

William R. Tonso (September 26, 1933 – November 16, 2016), was a professor emeritus of sociology at the University of Evansville.

He taught at the university from 1969 through 1999, specializing in minority and ethnic group relations, social deviance, social theory, and the sociology of sport. He formerly served as head of the departments of Sociology, Criminal Justice, and Anthropology.

He was a native of Herrin, Illinois, and his Ph.D. in Sociology (1976), M.S. in Business Administration specializing in Personnel Management (1966), and B.S. in Industrial Education (1955) were all from Southern Illinois University in nearby Carbondale.

Before becoming a professor, he served as a United States Air Force officer in the North American Air Defense Command and worked in industry.

His articles appeared as chapters in Don B. Kates, Jr.'s Firearms and Violence, Lee Nisbet's The Gun Control Debate: You Decide, and Robert K. Miller's The Informed Argument, and in periodicals and newspapers such as Academic Questions, Law & Policy Quarterly, Quarterly Journal of Ideology, Reason, Liberty, Chronicles, The Quill, American Legion, American Rifleman, Outdoor Life, Gun News Digest, Gun Week, USA Today, Washington Times, The Plain Dealer (Cleveland, Ohio), and the Baltimore Sun.

He died at the age of 83 in Evansville, Indiana on November 16, 2016.

== Partial list of publications ==
- "Social Science and Sagecraft in the Debate over Gun Control", Law and Policy Quarterly, vol. 5, no. 3, 1983: 325'
- "Gun Control: White Man's Law", Reason magazine, December 1985
- "Shooting Blind", Reason magazine, June 2000
- Gun and Society; The Social and Existential Roots of the American Attachment to Firearms – ISBN 978-0-8191-2378-7
- Gun Control = People Control – ISBN 978-1-4184-1497-9
- The Gun Culture and Its Enemies – ISBN 978-0-936783-05-5
