= Square D =

American electrical equipment company

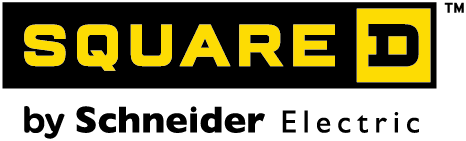
- Type: Subsidiary
- Industry: Electrical equipment
- Predecessor: McBride Manufacturing (1902–1908); Detroit Fuse and Manufacturing (1908–1917)
- Founder: Bryson Dexter Horton
- Headquarters: Andover, Massachusetts, U.S.
- Area served: North America, South America
- Products: electrical equipment
- Brands: Square D, QO, Homeline
- Number of employees: 17,102
- Parent: Schneider Electric
- Website: www.se.com/us/en/

Square D is an American manufacturer of electrical equipment headquartered in Andover, Massachusetts. Square D is a flagship brand of Schneider Electric, which acquired the company in 1991.

The company was listed on the New York Stock Exchange for 55 years prior to its acquisition without reporting financial loss in any calendar quarter, paying out 220 consecutive quarterly dividends to shareholders.

== History ==
The classic "Square D" logo can be found on their products. Adopted circa 1910.

The company was founded on December 15, 1902 by Bryson Dexter Horton and James B. McCarthy. In 1903 they incorporated as the McBride Manufacturing Company. During the first decade of business, the company expanded into various other electrical products. In 1908, the company was renamed Detroit Fuse and Manufacturing. Horton, an 1895 electrical engineering graduate of the University of Michigan, was credited with the invention of the safety switch, which encased high voltage switches and started the company's main line of business of circuit breakers and encased control panels. Their first enclosed safety switch was introduced in 1909.

Soon after their renaming to Detroit Fuse and Manufacturing, the company adopted their famous logo — a capital "letter D" for Detroit, enclosed in a square. The logo was stamped on all Square D's switches and products. The combination of an easily remembered monogram logo and their great popularity resulted in customers referring to their products as "Square D". Consequently, the company trademarked the logo and in 1917 they renamed the company Square D. Horton served as Square D's president until 1928

In the early 1920s Square D sold the majority of their fuse business in order to focus more on their safety switches and other safety products; advertisements with the tagline "Jones is Dead!" directed public attention to the lethal hazard of exposed electrical switches in factories. Square D hoped to capitalize on the growing concern of factory safety.

By 1929, Square D merged with a Milwaukee-based industrial controller company and began producing Westinghouse-licensed circuit breakers. In 1935 Square D began producing its own range of circuit breakers for both commercial and residential uses.

In the 1940s, Square D joined the war effort, eventually producing half of all circuit breakers used in military aviation.

In 1955 Square D innovated the three-quarter-inch circuit breaker, eliminating the need for the previously dominant removable fuses. Circuit breakers increased both convenience and safety by simply flipping a switch in response to power surges, rather than burning out. Square D also introduced panelboards to mount arrays of circuit breakers. By 2000, these technologies were in place in the majority of homes and businesses.

In 1960, Square D moved its headquarters from Detroit to Park Ridge, Illinois; then in 1979 the company opened a new, expansive corporate headquarters in Palatine, Illinois. During this period the company was expanding worldwide.

In 1991, the company was acquired and became a subsidiary of the Parisian Schneider Electric. At the time of sale, Square D had 18,500 employees and sales of $1.65 billion worldwide.

In 2003, the Square D and Schneider Electric celebrated its 100th anniversary, in part by donating an original 1922 enclosed safety switch to the Smithsonian Museum; the switch is still functional.

Today the company produces several lines of circuit breakers for domestic, commercial, and industrial applications.

== Gallery ==
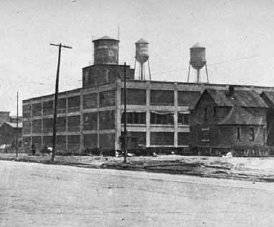
The Square D plant on Rivard Street in Detroit, 1920.

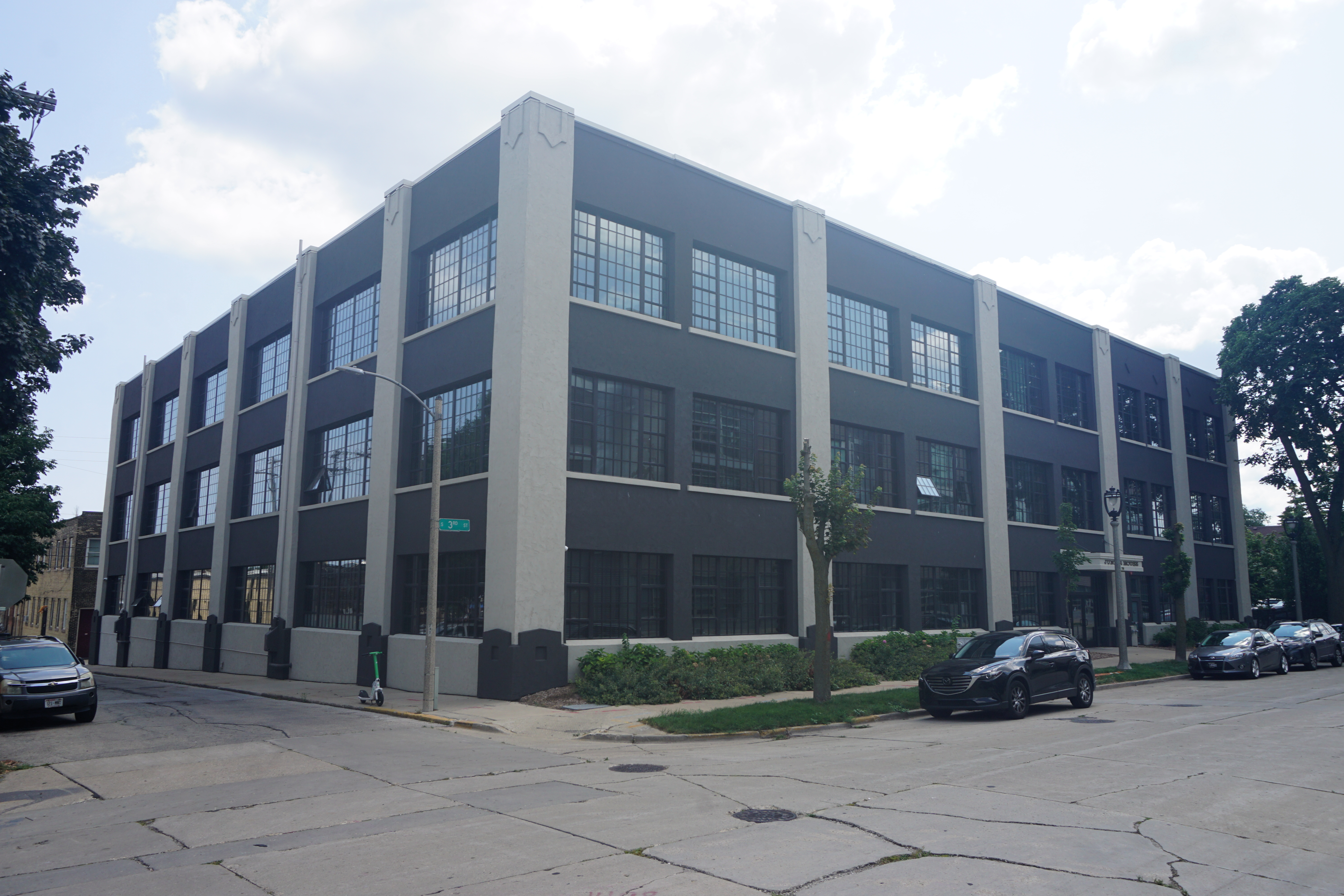
Square D Company/Industrial Controller Division building in Milwaukee

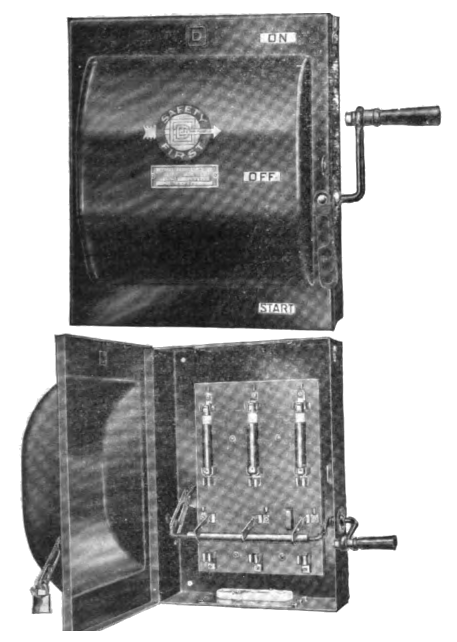
A 1917 Square D enclosed 3-pole safety switch, utilizing cartridge fuses.

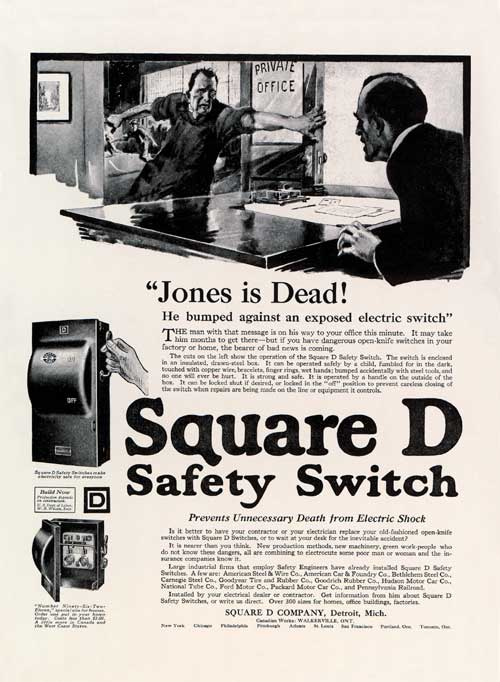
SquareD "Jones is Dead!" advertisement, 1921

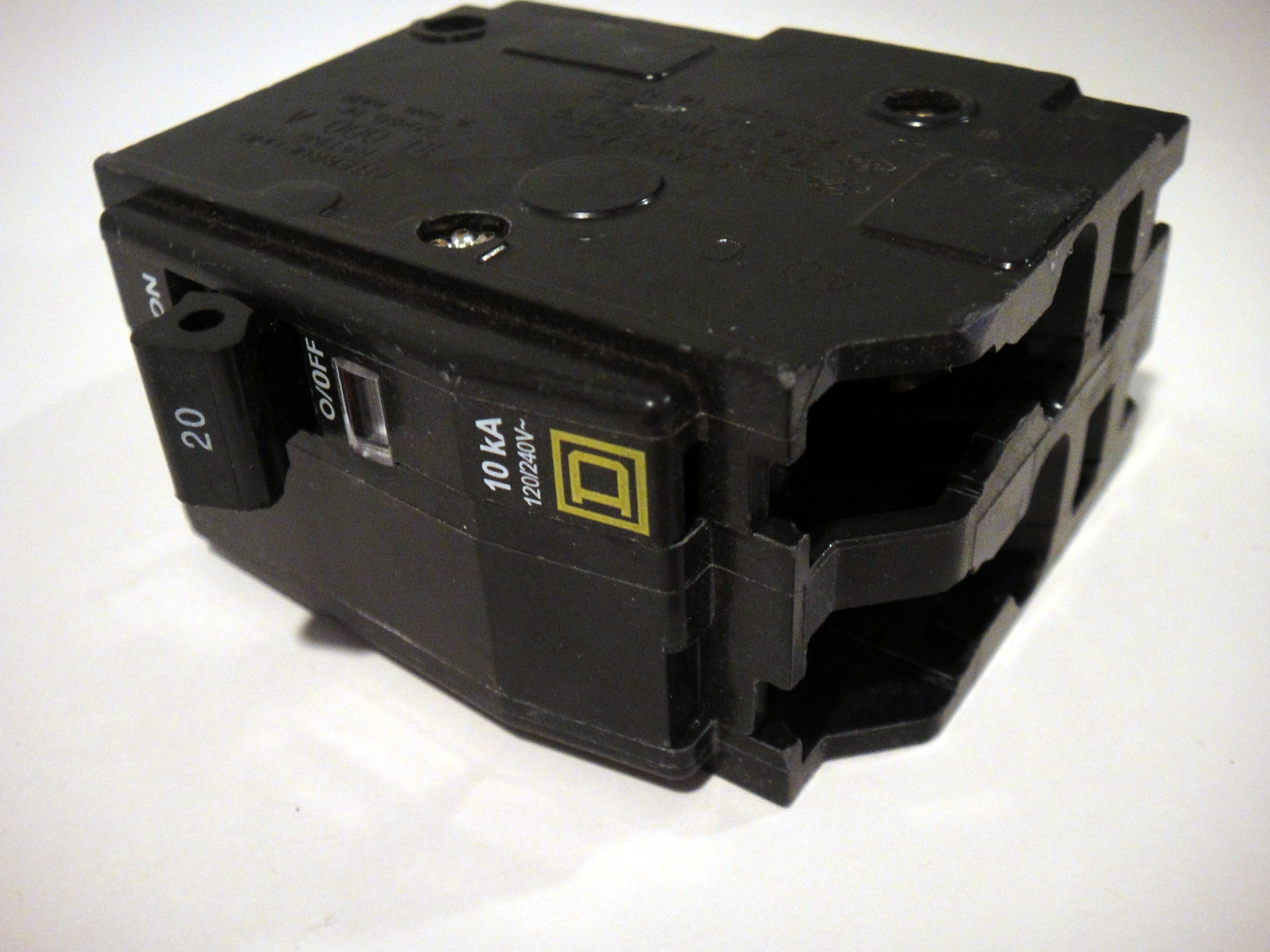
A modern 20-ampere double-pole Square D circuit breaker.
