= APC Smart-UPS =

UPS made by American Power Conversion

The Smart-UPS is a series of enterprise-level uninterruptible power supplies (UPS) made by American Power Conversion (APC). Most of the units have a SmartSlot (with the exception of SC and SMC series) which accepts an optional interface card providing features ranging from network connectivity to temperature and humidity monitoring. With the exception of RT and SRT series, Smart-UPS units are line-interactive UPS systems, only running their inverters when the grid power is unavailable.

== See also ==
- Apcupsd
- Network UPS Tools (NUT)
