= Corporate Knights =

Canadian company

- Categories: Clean capitalism
- Frequency: Quarterly
- Circulation: 126,000+
- Founder: Toby Heaps, Paul Fengler and Peter Diplaros
- First issue: June 2002
- Country: Canada and United States
- Based in: Toronto
- Language: English
- Website: corporateknights.com
- ISSN: 1703-2016

Corporate Knights is a media and research company based in Toronto, Canada, focused on advancing a sustainable economy. The company publishes a magazine, Corporate Knights, and produces global rankings, research reports, and financial product ratings based on corporate and environmental sustainability performance, including the "Global 100 Most Sustainable Corporations in the World" and the "Best 50 Corporate Citizens in Canada".

== History ==
Corporate Knights Inc. was co-founded in 2002 by Toby A. Heaps, Paul Fengler and Peter Diplaros. According to Heaps, the trio created the magazine as a "halfway house between Adbusters and Forbes." The magazine was first published in the wake of the accounting scandal at Enron and WorldCom with the objective of holding companies more accountable. The three founders believed that "if you want to make social change, it's through business." Heaps later coined the term "clean capitalism".

Corporate Knights looks to highlight regional and national opportunities for the clean energy transition by acting as an advisor to corporations, governments and people working toward a more sustainable economy.

== Organization ==
=== Corporate Knights media ===
Corporate Knights is published quarterly and maintains an editorial focus on climate change, responsible investing, and the ideas, actions and innovations that shape a sustainable economy. It is distributed in The Globe and Mail, The Washington Post, and The Wall Street Journal. In 2012, Corporate Knights was named "Magazine of the Year" by the National Media Awards Foundation.

In 2019, following the publication of "The high cost of low corporate taxes" by Marco Chown Oved, Toby Heaps, and Michael Yow, Corporate Knights was awarded the Society for Advancing Business Editing and Writing (SABEW) Canada Silver Award for Investigative Reporting.

=== Corporate Knights research ===
The Corporate Knights research division produces global sustainability rankings, research reports and financial product ratings based on corporate sustainability performance. Corporate Knights publishes upwards of 10 annual rankings, including the Global 100 Most Sustainable Corporations in the World, released each year in Davos during the World Economic Forum, and the Best 50 Corporate Citizens in Canada.

Since 2005, the Global 100 has looked to emphasize the impact of a company's core products and services. It is the best-performing global sustainability index (CKG100), with more than 10 years of history. Gartner's Market Guide for Corporate ESG Ratings and Research (June 2022) stated that among the main ESG research data providers, "Corporate Knights is the only provider to track the 'clean CapEx', clean R&D', and 'clean acquisitions' against a common taxonomy."

Corporate Knights also acts as a research partner to the Sustainable Markets Initiative for the Terra Carta Seal, awarded to global companies that are leaders on sustainability and have credible net-zero plans, that was launched in 2021 by HRH The Prince of Wales at COP26 in Glasgow.

Corporate Knights rankings are regularly cited in leading business publications, including Fast Company, The Financial Times, and Forbes.

=== Financial information products ===
Corporate Knights’ Sustainable Economy Intelligence tracks corporate decarbonization efforts globally. Its research offers three-year trend analyses on sustainable revenue, sustainable investment, executive compensation alignment and related operational metrics.

== Initiatives and affiliations ==
=== Council for Clean Capitalism ===
In 2012, Corporate Knights Inc. spearheaded the creation of the Council for Clean Capitalism, a multi-industry group of leading Canadian companies dedicated to advocating for economic and social-policy changes that reward responsible corporate behavior and remove barriers to clean capitalism. The council's 10 members include Sun Life Financial, Vancity, Brookfield Global Integrated Solutions Canada and Teck Resources.

Corporate Knights provides secretariat support to make the council's work possible.

== Stories and reports ==
=== Sustainable Cities index ===
Launched in June 2022, the Sustainable Cities Index is an interactive, crowd-sourced sustainability index for cities. To rank cities, Corporate Knights leveraged 12 key indicators of urban sustainability related to climate change, air quality, land use, transportation, water, waste, policy, and resilience. Stockholm was the top scoring city in 2022.

=== Future 50 fastest growing sustainable companies ===
The Future 50 is a list of the fastest growing private and publicly traded Canadian companies whose business activities align with the transition to a global clean economy. In 2022, Alberta-based Eavor Technologies was the top-ranking private company and Ontario-based Next Hydrogen Solutions was the top-ranking publicly traded company.

=== Earth Index ===
The Corporate Knights EARTH INDEX is a measurement of the speed at which countries (by sector)] are reducing greenhouse gas (GHG) emissions relative to the speed required to deliver on their commitments.

=== Responsible Funds ===
Ranking mutual funds and ETFs based on their financial and sustainability performance and ESG-aligned management commitments, Corporate Knights publishes an annual list of top responsible funds for the planet.

=== Better World MBA ===
The Better World MBA is an annual ranking of the world's most sustainable MBA programs.

=== Paid Sick Leave Provision report (2020) ===
The Corporate Knights Paid Sick Leave Provision project assessed the extent of paid sick leave policies in the largest companies across North America and the world in the wake of COVID-19.

=== Green 50 ===
In 2020, Corporate Knights launched an open-nomination process to determine which corporate actions have had the biggest impact on improving the state of affairs on our planet. After reviewing a shortlist of 150 companies, four judges voted on their top 50 picks. Judges included Pierre Lussier, director of Earth Day Canada, John Oppermann, executive director of Earth Day Initiative, Adria Vasil, managing editor of Corporate Knights and Toby Heaps. Patagonia was voted as the top green company.

=== Greenest president ===
Speaking to the tradition of environmental protection in the White House, Corporate Knights named Theodore Roosevelt as the greenest president in U.S. history, followed by Richard Nixon.

The selection was determined by a committee of leading environmentalists. Twelve individuals led their respective group's participation in the survey: Frances Beinecke, president of the Natural Resources Defense Council; Phil Radford, executive director of Greenpeace USA; Michael Brune, executive director of the Sierra Club; Carter Roberts, CEO of WWF-US; Mark Tercek, CEO of The Nature Conservancy; Robert Engelman, president of the Worldwatch Institute; Erich Pica, president of Friends of the Earth; Kevin Knobloch, president of the Union of Concerned Scientists; Van Jones, president of Rebuild the Dream; Bill McKibben, founder of 350.org; Joe Romm, publisher of Climate Progress; and Ralph Nader, founder of Public Citizen.

=== United Nations reports ===
Corporate Knights worked with the United Nations’ Inquiry into a Sustainable Financial System to co-author A Review of International Financial Standards as they Relate to Sustainable Development.

Corporate Knights also led a report with the United Nations Environment Programme. The report, Financial Centres for Sustainability: Reviewing Experience and Identifying Options in the G7, was commissioned by Italy’s ministry of the environment (MATTM) as part of Italy’s G7 Presidency that year.

== Events ==
=== Global 100 Dinners ===
During the annual World Economic Forum in Davos, Switzerland, Corporate Knights hosts the Global 100 Davos Dinner and announces the year's most sustainable companies.

=== Best 50 Gala ===
The Annual Best 50 Corporate Citizens in Canada are announced each summer at a gala in Toronto. Awards of distinction are also presented at this event.

=== Online roundtables ===
Corporate Knights frequently hosts virtual events, such as "Fireside Stories for the Climate" with David Suzuki and Margaret Atwood.

== Public policy ==
Corporate Knights has undertaken research model investment pathways for Canada to achieve its climate goals in a way that boosts the economy, including the Build Back Better Synthesis Report, which was backed in a letter signed by many Canadian business leaders and made into a short video. The analysis and data were also used to underpin a Citizen's Budget. Corporate Knights updated this work in 2022 with a Climate and Economic Renewal Investment Plan.

In 2006, Corporate Knights put forth a $100 billion carbon pricing plan for Canada to reach its Kyoto target, convening the first Energy Ministers' meeting on building a trans-canadian grid for transporting green electricity from where it is generated to where it is needed,

In 2007, Corporate Knights helped put together a working group to explore a Green Power Corridor transmission grid to enable the decarbonization of Canada's electricity supply.

Option13 was launched in 2008 to promote a unified price on carbon in the face of climate change. Ralph Nader and Corporate Knights' Toby Heaps published an article about it in The Wall Street Journal.

In 2010, Corporate Knights supported Bill C-300 and testimony was given by Toby Heaps to support the business case for ethical mining.

=== Action Declaration on Climate Policy Engagement ===
On November 8, 2022, at COP27 in Egypt, Corporate Knights launched the Action Declaration on Climate Policy Engagement. Signatories include more than 50 corporations.
