= Esco (name) =

Esco may refer to the following people:

Given name

- Esco Sarkkinen (1918–1998), American football player and coach
- Esco Haynes, American professional baseball player
- Esco Niblo Bowen (born 1893 – died 1959), American lawyer, judge and politician
- Sigmund Esco Jackson (born 1951), American singer and musician
- William Esco Moerner (born 1953), American physical chemist and chemical physicist awarded Nobel Prize in Chemistry in 2014

Surname

- Lina Esco (born 1985), American actress

Nickname

- DJ Esco (born 1990), American DJ from Georgia
- Nas (born 1973), nicknamed Esco, American rapper
