= Norris City, Illinois =

Norris City
- Village
- Location of Norris City in White County, Illinois.
- Coordinates: 37°58′44″N 88°19′40″W
- Country: United States
- State: Illinois
- County: White

Area
  - Total: 1.17 sq mi (3.04 km^{2})
  - Land: 1.17 sq mi (3.04 km^{2})
  - Water: 0 sq mi (0.00 km^{2})
- Elevation: 427 ft (130 m)

Population (2020)
  - Total: 1,145
  - Density: 976.9/sq mi (377.19/km^{2})
- Time zone: UTC-6 (CST)
  - Summer (DST): UTC-5 (CDT)
- ZIP Code(s): 62869
- Area code: 618
- FIPS code: 17-53403
- GNIS ID: 2399506
- Website: villageofnorriscity.com

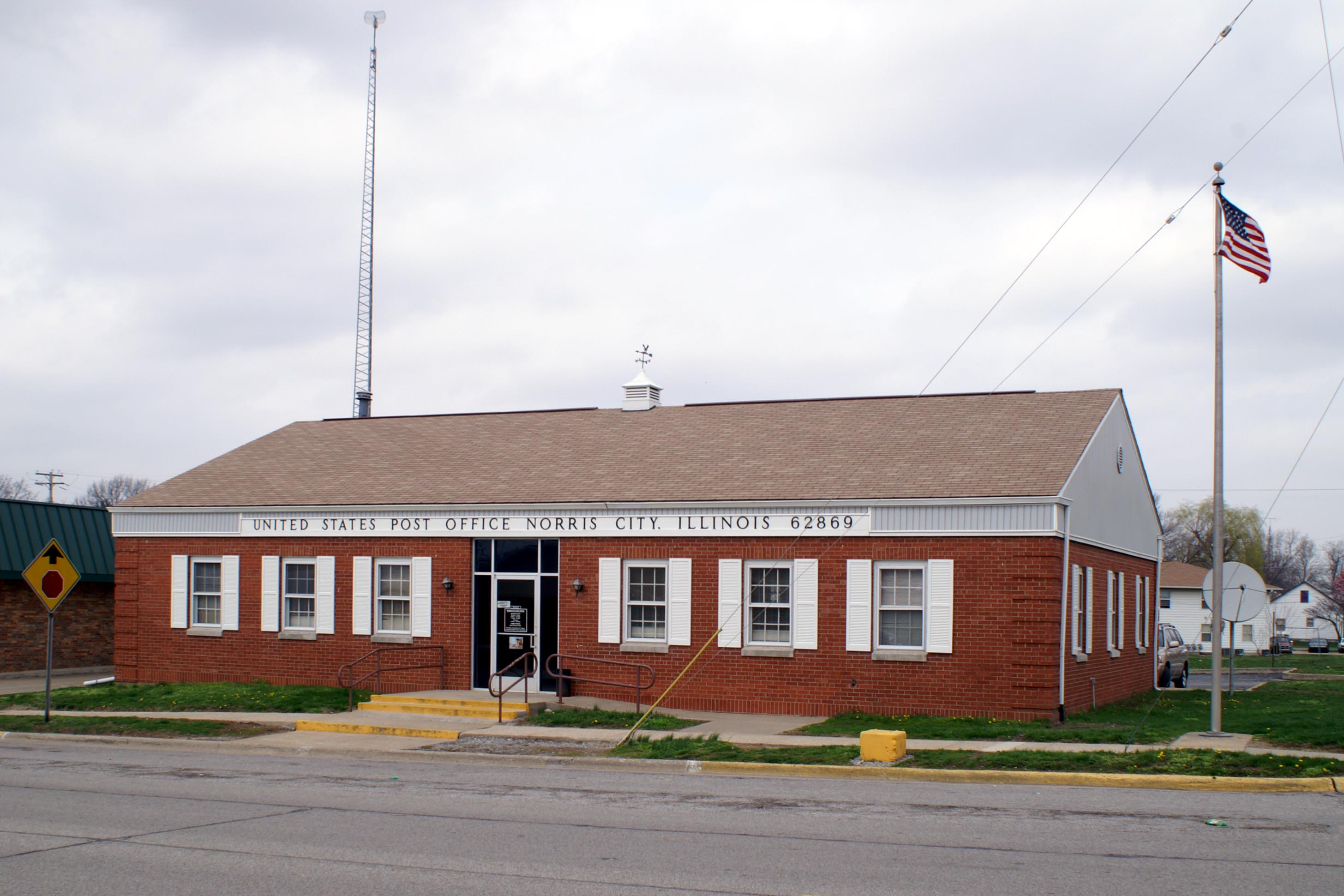
The Norris City Post Office

The high school in Norris City

Going into downtown Norris City along Main Street

Norris City is a village in White County, Illinois, United States. The population was 1,145 according to 2020 census data.

== History ==
Norris City was incorporated in 1901. The original plat of Norris City was filed in the White County Courthouse in Carmi, Illinois on August 17, 1871. The post office at Norris City was established May 15, 1871, with William A. Johnson appointed as the first Postmaster.

=== Origin of the village name ===
The name for Norris City had to have been decided prior to the time it was platted and prior to the opening of the post office. The question of how Norris City got its name has caused many debates throughout the years.

The new community, for a short time in early 1871, was called "Popeye" or "Popeye's Station", after William A. Johnson, the first depot agent at the site, who had been given the nickname of "Popeye" by train crews or local schoolchildren because his eyes protruded. In some accounts trainmen said they were stopping at “Popeye” or "Popeye's Station." (This was long before the days of the Popeye cartoon character, which was created by a native of Chester, Illinois.)

Stories about how Norris City got its name are varied. According to one story, when the people of the new village met to choose a name for their community they decided that the name would come from the person or family having the most land in the area. After the acreages were added up, the Norris family beat out the Johnson family by just a few acres. As the story goes William Norris, the head of the Norris family, went home from the meeting and told his wife, Emaline (White) Norris, who replied she didn't think it was such a big deal to have such a small place named after him.

Another version is that the Springfield and Illinois Southern Railway had been doing business with Norris and decided to name the town after him.

In another account Thomas Ridgway, the President of the Springfield and Illinois Southern Railway, for whom Ridgway, Illinois was named, was on a train going through the settlement. When he asked what the town had been named, John William Norris of Fairfield, Illinois, either the foreman of the construction crew or the train's conductor or engineer, allegedly said the trainmen call it "Popeye" or "Popeye's Station." Mr. Ridgway, so the story goes, said that was no name for a town, to which the trainman supposedly replied, “Why don’t you name it after me?”

Another version of this story is that the engineer of the work train constructing the railroad tracks to the site of Norris City boarded at the home of William Norris and his wife Emaline (White) Norris. In this account he suggested the name for the town because he was fond of Emaline Norris' cooking.

A 1947 guidebook to the state of Illinois refers to Norris City being named in honor of a pioneer settler, William Norris. A reference report of the Illinois State Historical Library states, “No information is available in our records as to the origins of the name, Norris City.”

=== The Big Inch pipeline ===
During World War II, the United States Government built the Big Inch pipeline to move oil from Longview, Texas to the Northeastern part of the country. The Big Inch pipeline helped relieve pressure on oil tankers in the Atlantic, which were being sunk by German U-boats.

In 1943, the pipeline had a temporary terminus in Norris City, where the oil was stored before being transferred to railcars; Norris City was selected for this role due to its access to the railroad. After the end of the war, the government sold the pipeline to private companies, which now use it for natural gas transportation. A historical marker in Norris City commemorates the Big Inch's role in World War II.

== Geography ==
According to the 2010 census, Norris City has a total area of 1.182 square miles (3.06 km^{2}), of which 1.18 square miles (3.06 km^{2}) (or 99.83%) is land and 0.002 square miles (0.01 km^{2}) (or 0.17%) is water.

== Demographics ==
Historical population
Census	Pop.	Note	%±
1880	40		—
1890	223		457.5%
1900	868		289.2%
1910	1,055		21.5%
1920	1,300		23.2%
1930	1,109		−14.7%
1940	1,295		16.8%
1950	1,370		5.8%
1960	1,243		−9.3%
1970	1,319		6.1%
1980	1,515		14.9%
1990	1,341		−11.5%
2000	1,057		−21.2%
2010	1,275		20.6%
2020	1,145		−10.2%
U.S. Decennial Census

=== 2020 census ===
As of the 2020 census, Norris City had a population of 1,145. The median age was 40.7 years. 23.9% of residents were under the age of 18 and 21.0% of residents were 65 years of age or older. For every 100 females there were 100.5 males, and for every 100 females age 18 and over there were 93.1 males age 18 and over.

0.0% of residents lived in urban areas, while 100.0% lived in rural areas.

There were 496 households in Norris City, of which 27.6% had children under the age of 18 living in them. Of all households, 38.9% were married-couple households, 24.6% were households with a male householder and no spouse or partner present, and 31.3% were households with a female householder and no spouse or partner present. About 40.0% of all households were made up of individuals and 20.6% had someone living alone who was 65 years of age or older.

There were 586 housing units, of which 15.4% were vacant. The homeowner vacancy rate was 2.3% and the rental vacancy rate was 11.3%.

Racial composition as of the 2020 census
Race	Number	Percent
White	1,079	94.2%
Black or African American	1	0.1%
American Indian and Alaska Native	0	0.0%
Asian	0	0.0%
Native Hawaiian and Other Pacific Islander	5	0.4%
Some other race	4	0.3%
Two or more races	56	4.9%
Hispanic or Latino (of any race)	14	1.2%

=== Income and poverty ===
The median income for a household in the village was $37,778, and the median income for a family was $55,250. Males had a median income of $25,972 versus $14,868 for females. The per capita income for the village was $13,671. About 9.4% of families and 23.45% of the population were below the poverty line, including 23.9% of those under age 18 and 9.7% of those age 65 or over.

== Culture ==
A popular festival known as Dairy Days takes place during the weekend of the fourth Saturday in September each year. Dairy Days has been held annually since 1947. The festival was organized by the Lions Club until 2009, when the Dairy Days Association was formed to coordinate the annual festival.

== Notable people ==
- Ora Collard, Illinois state representative and businessman; born in Norris City
- Max Morris, pro football and basketball player; born in Norris City
- Floyd Newkirk, pitcher for the New York Yankees; born in Norris City
