= Chloride Group =

France-based power supply company

Chloride SAS
- Company type: Privately held company
- Industry: Power systems
- Founded: 1891; 135 years ago
- Fate: Acquired
- Headquarters: Lyon, France.
- Key people: Guillaume Perol (President and General Manager)
- Owner: private
- Website: www.chloride.com

Chloride is a global company that specializes in the design, production, and maintenance of industrial uninterruptible power supply (UPS) systems to ensure a reliable power supply for critical equipment across multiple industries. Formerly listed on the London Stock Exchange and a constituent of FTSE 250 index, the company has become privately owned since 2021.

== History ==
Chloride Group was founded in 1891 as The Chloride Electrical Syndicate Limited to manufacture batteries. Brand names used included Ajax, Exide, Dagenite, Kathanode, Shednought and Tudor.

In the 1970s, under its then managing director Sir Michael Edwardes it showcased the UK's first battery-powered buses.

In 1999, it diversified into secure power systems acquiring Oneac in the US, BOAR SA in Spain and Hytek in Australia. In 2000, it acquired the power protection division of Siemens in Germany and in 2001 it acquired Continuous Power International followed, in 2005, by Harath Engineering Services in the UK. In 2007, it acquired AST Electronique Services, a similar business in France.

In July 2009, the Company announced the acquisition of a 90% stake in India’s leading Uninterruptible power supply company, DB Power Electronics.

In September 2010, Chloride Group was fully acquired by Emerson Electric (joining the Emerson Network Power platform) of the United States for US$1.5 billion.

In 2016, Emerson Network Power was acquired by Platinum Equity for US$4 billion. The business was rebranded under the name Vertiv, launching as a stand-alone business.

In 2021, Chloride became an independent privately held company as a result of the buy-out of the business division of Vertiv by its management team supported by private investment fond Innovafonds and sovereign bank Bpifrance. The scope of the transaction comprised all industrial business activity globally including the manufacturing site in France, all patent and intellectual property, the registered trademarks Chloride and AEES as well as several regional assets. The product portfolio of Industrial AC and DC UPS systems as well as safety lighting portfolio were transferred in their entirety. On completion of this transaction the new group with pro-forma sales of $90 million in 2021 restored its historical name, Chloride.
