= Herrin, Illinois =

Herrin
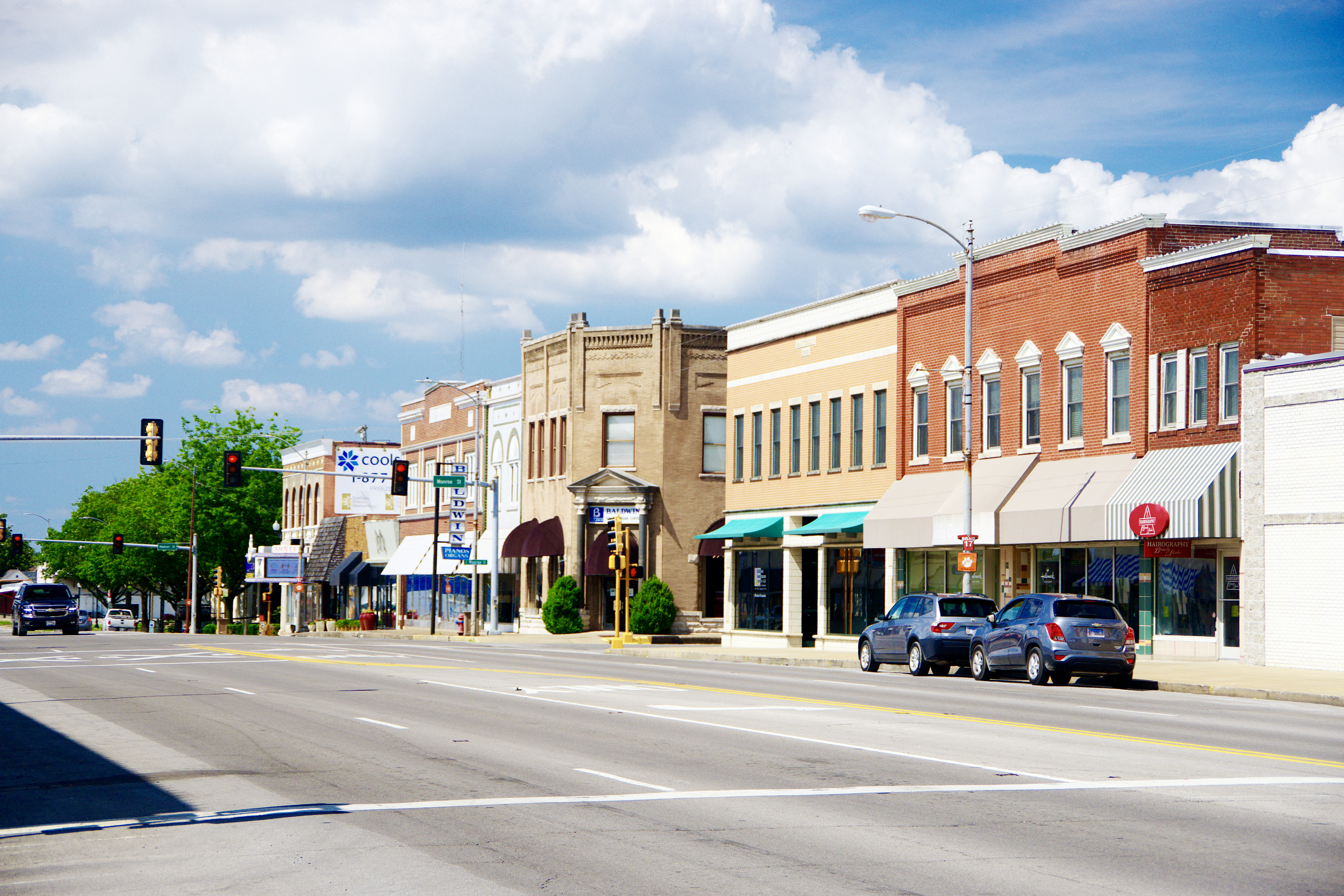
- N Park Ave (IL 148)

- Seal

- Location of Herrin in Williamson County, Illinois.
- Coordinates: 37°46′50″N 89°01′38″W
- Country: United States
- State: Illinois
- County: Williamson

Area
  - Total: 9.92 sq mi (25.69 km^{2})
  - Land: 9.67 sq mi (25.05 km^{2})
  - Water: 0.25 sq mi (0.64 km^{2})
- Elevation: 420 ft (130 m)

Population (2020)
  - Total: 12,352
  - Density: 1,277.0/sq mi (493.05/km^{2})
- Time zone: UTC−6 (CST)
  - Summer (DST): UTC−5 (CDT)
- ZIP Code: 62948
- Area code: 618
- FIPS code: 17-34358
- GNIS feature ID: 2394365
- Website: www.cityofherrin.com

Herrin is a city in Williamson County, Illinois. The population was 12,352 at the 2020 census. The city is part of the Marion-Herrin Micropolitan Area and is a part of the Carbondale-Marion-Herrin, Illinois Combined Statistical Area with 123,272 residents, the sixth most populous Combined statistical area in Illinois.

== History ==
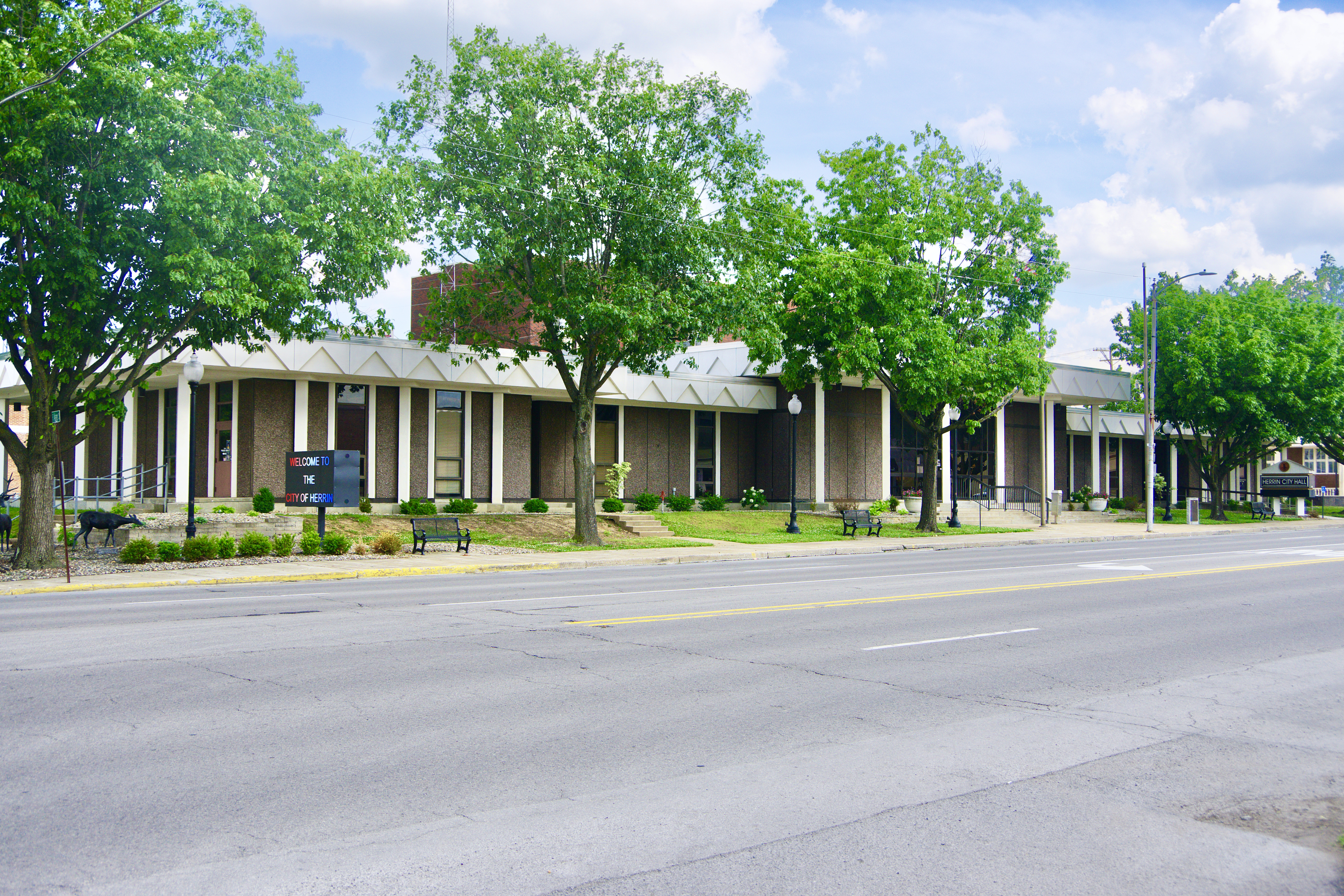
Herrin City hall

The settlement of Herrin started out as scattered settlers on Herring's Prairie named for the first permanent settler Isaac Herring, a Baptist preacher. Later, his son-in-law David Herrin arrived and the similarity in names led to the eventual shortening of the name to just Herrin's Prairie. The trails from Jordan's fort to Humphreys' ford on the Big Muddy River intersected the old trail from Lusk's ferry at modern-day Golconda to Kaskaskia, which was first settled by French colonists.

Isaac Herring entered the first land in what became Herrin on 4 November 1816, two years before Illinois became a state. He paid $2 an acre for the 160 acres (65 ha). At the time he lived to the west in Jackson County, the land entry was the northeast quarter off Section 30, Township 8 South, Range 2 East of the Third Principal Meridian. Today that area runs between 17th and 27th streets, and from West Cherry Street on the north to West Stotlar Street on the south.

David Ruffin Harrison started storekeeping on the prairie in 1858. During the Civil War, he built a frame store building and secured a fourth class post office that opened on May 26, 1864. After coal was discovered and mining began in nearby Carterville, Harrison, and his cousins Ephraim Snyder Herrin and Mrs. Williams in 1892 prospected for coal beginning at the southwest corner of Williams' farm, identified in 1939 as the corner of Legion Boulevard and East Herrin Street. (Legion Boulevard no longer appears on the maps, but the reference indicates the intersection was the North and North East public roads. The 1908 county atlas shows North East Public Road two blocks east of Park Avenue which would make it North 13th Street). "The men put up the cash, Mrs. Williams boarded the workers. A fine vein of coal was found at 185 feet."

In 1895, the Chicago and Carbondale Railroad organized to lay tracks between the Illinois Central Railroad at Carbondale and connect with the new Chicago, Paducah and Memphis Railroad that had opened up in 1894, going through the central part of the county. (This one later became the Chicago and Eastern Illinois Railroad). Herrin convinced the developers to take their line between Carbondale and Johnston City through Herrin. Soon after it opened, the line was sold to the Chicago and Texas Railroad in the fall of 1895.

The following spring on May 8, 1896, the post office changed to Herrin post office. Cousins Harrison and Herrin, great-grandsons of Isaac Herring, made plans for a new town. They platted a 40-acre site divided by the line between Sections 19 and 30 of the township. They filed the plat 4 December 1896. The community incorporated as a village on March 21, 1898, and as a city two years later on April 17, 1900.

Herrin was the site of the 1922 Herrin massacre, resulting in the deaths of 23 miners and guards.

When mining made the town prosperous, Herrin had a recreational park known as White City Park. It opened on Memorial Day 1924 with 5000 in attendance. It had a salt water swimming pool, rides, and a theater. Touring big bands played here. The Dorsey Brothers and Frank Sinatra played bocce ball and performed there.

President Harry S. Truman came to Herrin in September 1948. Three future presidents came to Herrin during campaigns: Richard Nixon, John F. Kennedy and Ronald Reagan. Gerald Ford came to the Herrin-Marion airport in the 1970s.

At one time Herrin had 10 hotels, many clothing stores, grocery stores as well as department stores. Of the grocery stores Herrin has had over the years, not including national chains, Louie's P&R is the only local store to remain open.

In the beginning of the 21st century, Herrin by coincidence experienced two total eclipses of the sun in just seven years - the first on August 21st, 2017, and the second on April 8th, 2024.

== Herrin railroad - later operations ==
On July 2, 1971, the Crab Orchard & Egyptian railroad was founded as American Rail Heritage and created a tourist railroad along the Illinois Central Railroad (ICG) owned tracks. The line, which was purchased from the ICG in September 1987, mostly serves the city's manufacturing industries along a 5-mile stretch of track. The COER acquired the property in 1977 from ICG without abandonment with freight service starting October 18, 1971. The Herrin Line ICG was acquired September 11, 1987. In late 2012, American Rail Heritage sold the railroad to Progressive Rail Incorporated. The railroad is currently operated by AMS Services and owned by the city of Herrin.

== Geography ==
According to the 2010 census, Herrin has a total area of 9.461 square miles (24.50 km^{2}), of which 9.23 square miles (23.91 km^{2}) (or 97.56%) is land and 0.231 square miles (0.60 km^{2}) (or 2.44%) is water.

== Demographics ==
Historical population
Census	Pop.	Note	%±
1900	1,559		—
1910	6,861		340.1%
1920	10,986		60.1%
1930	9,708		−11.6%
1940	9,352		−3.7%
1950	9,331		−0.2%
1960	9,474		1.5%
1970	9,623		1.6%
1980	10,708		11.3%
1990	10,857		1.4%
2000	11,298		4.1%
2010	12,534		10.9%
2020	12,352		−1.5%
U.S. Census

=== 2020 census ===
As of the 2020 census, Herrin had a population of 12,352. The median age was 40.1 years. 23.3% of residents were under the age of 18 and 19.3% of residents were 65 years of age or older. For every 100 females there were 89.8 males, and for every 100 females age 18 and over there were 86.7 males age 18 and over.

94.2% of residents lived in urban areas, while 5.8% lived in rural areas.

There were 5,354 households in Herrin, of which 28.8% had children under the age of 18 living in them. Of all households, 39.8% were married-couple households, 19.5% were households with a male householder and no spouse or partner present, and 32.7% were households with a female householder and no spouse or partner present. About 34.6% of all households were made up of individuals and 16.3% had someone living alone who was 65 years of age or older.

There were 6,073 housing units, of which 11.8% were vacant. The homeowner vacancy rate was 3.4% and the rental vacancy rate was 13.1%.

Racial composition as of the 2020 census
Race	Number	Percent
White	10,906	88.3%
Black or African American	386	3.1%
American Indian and Alaska Native	29	0.2%
Asian	177	1.4%
Native Hawaiian and Other Pacific Islander	2	0.0%
Some other race	110	0.9%
Two or more races	742	6.0%
Hispanic or Latino (of any race)	305	2.5%

=== 2000 census ===
As of the census of 2000, there were 11,298 people, 4,831 households, and 3,014 families residing in the city. The population density was 1,377.5 inhabitants per square mile (531.9/km^{2}). There were 5,202 housing units at an average density of 634.2 per square mile (244.9/km^{2}). The racial makeup of the city was 96.72% White, 0.92% African American, 0.35% Native American, 0.67% Asian, 0.03% Pacific Islander, 0.31% from other races, and 1.01% from two or more races. Hispanic or Latino of any race were 0.95% of the population.

There were 4,831 households, out of which 27.8% had children under the age of 18 living with them, 48.2% were married couples living together, 11.1% had a female householder with no husband present, and 37.6% were non-families. 33.1% of all households were made up of individuals, and 16.4% had someone living alone who was 65 years of age or older. The average household size was 2.26 and the average family size was 2.88.

In the city, the population was spread out, with 22.2% under the age of 18, 8.1% from 18 to 24, 26.8% from 25 to 44, 22.7% from 45 to 64, and 20.2% who were 65 years of age or older. The median age was 40 years. For every 100 females, there were 84.2 males. For every 100 females age 18 and over, there were 81.5 males.

The median income for a household in the city was $28,532, and the median income for a family was $39,108. Males had a median income of $31,545 versus $22,321 for females. The per capita income for the city was $16,782. About 13.6% of families and 16.0% of the population were below the poverty line, including 23.7% of those under age 18 and 11.2% of those age 65 or over.

== Sister city ==
On the 17th of July 2015 mayors Steve Frattini and Flavio Polloni signed the Twinning Proclamation Act to officially declare Herrin and Cuggiono as sister cities.

- – Cuggiono (Milan, Lombardy, Italy) (2015)

== Events and festivals ==
Herrin hosts the annual HerrinFesta Italiana, a Memorial Day weekend celebration of the town's Italian heritage. The five-day event often draws over 60,000 people for live music, authentic Italian food, a carnival, Bocce Ball tournament, and "Bigga Nose" and pasta-eating contests, as well as many other activities. Past artists and bands include Survivor (band), Dixie Chicks, Night Ranger, Josh Gracin, Blake Shelton, Blue Öyster Cult, Florida Georgia Line, Eddie Money, The Guess Who, Kansas (band), Starship (band), Papa Roach, Saving Abel, Theory of a Deadman, Foreigner (band), and Collective Soul.

== Notable people ==
- E. N. Bowen, Illinois state legislator, judge, and lawyer
- Ray Chapman, early 20th Century shortstop for Cleveland Indians
- Richard Clarida, Vice Chairman of the Federal Reserve
- Ora Collard, Illinois state representative and businessman
- Steve Fisher, basketball coach
- David Lee Murphy, country music artist
- Joseph W. Ozbourn, Medal of Honor recipient
- Jim Ranchino, political scientist in Arkadelphia, Arkansas
- William R. Tonso, professor of sociology at the University of Evansville.
- Bobby Veach, early 20th Century Detroit Tigers outfielder

== See also ==
- Herrin High School
