= TAC (building automation) =

Swedish building automation company

TAC AB
- Company type: Subsidiary
- Industry: Building automation
- Founded: Malmö, Sweden 1925; 101 years ago (as Tour Agenturer)
- Defunct: 2009; 17 years ago
- Fate: Fully acquired by Schneider Electric
- Successor: Schneider Electric
- Headquarters: Malmö, Sweden
- Number of locations: 80 countries, including UK, United States, France, Germany, Norway and Denmark
- Key people: Chris Curtis, CEO; Thomas Hansson, CFO; Dean Meyer, CEO
- Products: Energy solutions and security
- Revenue: $2,000 million USD (2007)
- Number of employees: 7,500 (2007)
- Parent: Schneider Electric
- Divisions: Energy Solutions; Building Solutions
- Website: www.se.com

TAC is a Swedish-based building automation company in the fields of both energy and security. It also operates in other countries including the United Kingdom and the United States.

It was originally established in 1925 as Tour Agenturer in Stockholm.

TAC announced a name change of its parent company Schneider Electric in October 2009.

== History ==
=== 1925–1995 ===
In the beginning, the company produced a product range focusing particularly on draught regulators and radiator valves.

It continued to develop its product range introducing the first transistorized heating regulator in 1962 and a computer-based system for climate control in 1974.

Tour Agenturer became Tour & Andersson in 1977 following a merger with AH Andersson.

Over the following years, Tour & Andersson extended its product range to include an integrated access control system and hotel management & signal system in 1980 and 1981 respectively.

In 1987 it released Micro 7, an IBM PC-based control system with an easier user interface than previously available. It was operated with a mouse in a similar fashion to modern-day computers.

In 1994, the company "moves towards open systems architecture." The following year, Tour & Andersson was separated into two companies: TA Hydronics and TA Control.. TA Hydronics became IMI Hydronic Engineering in 2014

=== 1996–2006 ===
The first major development by TA Control arrived in 1996 with a programmable control system featuring graphical programming.

The following year TA Control changed its name to TAC and focused equally on its services and systems operations in addition to its international partner networks. TAC acquired Norwegian major systems integration company, Solberg Andersen in 1998 shortly before being bought by investment company EQT.

Between 1998 and 2006, several more acquisitions and mergers took place, beginning with TAC's acquisition of Danish-based Danfoss System Automatik. It then merged with CSI—an American company based in Dallas, Texas—in 2000 to create a new company of 2,000 employees covering three major regions: Europe, the Americas and the Pacific.

The years 2002 and 2003 brought further development for TAC Group with its acquisition of both Control Solutions and MicroSign in 2002 before TAC Group was itself acquired by French-based Schneider Electric in 2003. In 2004, the company bought Seattle-based Abacus Engineered Systems which was then merged with the Energy Solutions Division of TAC.

In the same year TAC's parent company, Schneider Electric, acquired Andover Controls which was then merged with TAC to boost its security operations in addition to expanding its building automation activities.

The company became Tour Andover Controls and merged with three more companies over the next two years: Satchwell Controls and the European division of Invensys Advanced Building Systems in 2005, and Invensys Building Systems (IBS) in 2006.

It became TAC Satchwell for a brief period between 2005 and 2007 during the integration of Satchwell Controls into the company.

=== 2007 to 2008 ===
The year 2007 brought TAC's most recent merger with Pelco, Dean Meyer in charge of the Pelco division. TAC now covers 7 continents and 80 countries.

=== 2009 to present ===
TAC adopted the name of its parent company, Schneider Electric, six years after the acquisition.

== Industries ==
- Commercial
- Education
- Healthcare
- Data Centers
- Hotel
- Transportation
- Retail
- Industry and Technology
- Government and Military
- Residential
- Life Sciences
