= Mark Tercek =

Author and president of The Nature Conservancy

Mark R. Tercek is the former president and CEO of The Nature Conservancy. He is co-author of the book Nature’s Fortune: How Business and Society Thrive by Investing in Nature. Prior to The Nature Conservancy, he was a manager director and partner at Goldman Sachs for 24 years and was a member of the faculty at New York University Stern School of Business. He has been profiled in The New Yorker, Bloomberg BusinessWeek, The Wall Street Journal, The Atlantic, and Delta's Sky Magazine. Tercek is a member of the Williams College Board of Trustees.

== Selected publications ==
- Tercek, Mark R.; Adams, Jonathan S. (2013). Nature's fortune : how business and society thrive by investing in nature. Basic Books. ISBN 9780465031818.
