= Esco, Kentucky =

Unincorporated community in Kentucky, United States

Esco
- Unincorporated community
- Location within the state of Kentucky Esco (the United States)
- Coordinates: 37°22′1″N 82°33′3″W
- Country: United States
- State: Kentucky
- County: Pike
- Elevation: 768 ft (234 m)
- Time zone: UTC-6 (Central (CST))
  - Summer (DST): UTC-5 (CST)
- GNIS feature ID: 507947

Esco is an unincorporated community and coal town in Pike County, Kentucky, United States. Its post office is closed.
