= E. N. Bowen =

American lawyer, judge, and politician

Esco Niblo Bowen

Member of the Illinois House of Representatives from the 50th district
- In office 1940–1942

Personal details
- Born: May 27, 1893 Lawrence County, Illinois
- Died: February 24, 1959 (aged 65) Herrin, Illinois
- Party: Democratic
- Spouse: Beulah M. Sharder
- Children: 1
- Education: Illinois State University, Illinois Wesleyan University
- Occupation: Lawyer, Judge, Politician

Esco Niblo Bowen (May 27, 1893–February 24, 1959) was an American lawyer, judge, and politician.

Bowen was born on a farm in Lawrence County, Illinois. He went to the Lawrence County public schools and to Sumner High School in Sumner, Illinois. Bowen went to Illinois State University and to law school at Illinois Wesleyan University. Bowen was admitted to the Illinois bar in 1915. He practiced law in Herrin, Illinois. He served as the city attorney for Bridgeport, Illinois from 1915 to 1917. Bowen served as Herrin City Court judge and as Williamson County Court judge. Bowen also served as mater in chancery for Williamson County. Bowen served in the Illinois House of Representatives in 1941 and 1942. He was a Democrat. From 1954 to 1957, Bowen served as Herrin City Attorney. He was involved in farming and horse breeding. Bowen died at Herrin Hospital in Herrin after being ill for several years.
