= Esco (Singaporean company) =

Singaporean company

- Type: Private
- Industry: Life sciences
- Founded: 1978
- Founder: Lim Lay Yew
- Headquarters: Singapore (Asia Pacific); Horsham, USA (North America); Barnsley, UK (Europe)
- Key people: XQ (Xiangqian) Lin (CEO) Alvin Heah (Business Development)

Esco is a Singaporean brand that develops, manufactures, and sells products and services for laboratories.

Esco's products are used in academic, medical and industrial research laboratories in the pharmaceutical, biotech, chemical and food industries. They are also used in industrial laboratories where industry, analysis, production and quality assurance are performed.

== History ==
Esco started in 1978.

Esco has won Singapore Prestige Brand Awards's Regional Brand in 2014, 2015, and 2016.
