= Franklin Electric =

Manufacturing company

Franklin Electric Co., Inc.
- Type: Public
- Traded as: Nasdaq: FELE; S&P 600 component
- ISIN: US3535141028
- Industry: Manufacturing
- Founded: 1944; 82 years ago
- Headquarters: Fort Wayne, Indiana, United States
- Key people: Joe Ruzynski (CEO)
- Revenue: 2.1 billion (2023)
- Number of employees: 6,400 (2023)
- Website: franklin-electric.com

Franklin Electric Co., Inc. is a manufacturer and distributor of products and systems focused on the movement and management of water and energy. The company offers pumps, motors, drives, and controls for use in a variety of residential, commercial, agricultural, industrial, and municipal applications. Headquartered in Fort Wayne, Indiana, the company also operates manufacturing facilities in the United States, Germany, Czech Republic, Italy, Turkey, Mexico, Brazil, Australia, South Africa, China, and Japan.

== History ==
Franklin Electric was founded in 1944 in Bluffton, Indiana, USA by E.J. (Ed) Schaefer and T.W. (Wayne) Kehoe. They named the company Franklin Electric in honor of Benjamin Franklin, whom they considered the country's first electrical engineer. The company's first product was a backpack generator to power the radio equipment paratroopers and other assault troops used during WWII.

When WWII concluded, Franklin experienced a reduction in orders. Schaefer and Kehoe began designing and manufacturing fractional horsepower motors to pump water into homes or out of flooded basements to adjust to the peacetime economy. This new product hit the market coinciding with the home building boom that occurred as G.I.s returned from war. The motors performed well and led to nearly $1.7 million in sales in 1947. In 1950, Franklin introduced the first electric motor that was fully submersible. The new pump motors were quiet, resistant to freezing, smaller, easy to install, and had a high pumping capacity. The new motors could recover water from much deeper in the earth, making it possible for the first time to develop areas with low water tables. The motors also proved extremely versatile. Eventually, they would be used for gasoline pumps, commercial air conditioning units, crude oil recovery, and deep-sea use. Another early Franklin success was the Submatic sump pump. The Submatic was sealed in a unique stainless-steel casing designed to automatically sense when water was rising and turn on the motor. With the Submatic, an external float switch was no longer needed, and the motor could be mounted out of sight beneath the floor level.

By the mid-60s, it was clear that Franklin motors could pump more than just water. The company began designing and producing motors to pump oil, as well as motors for undersea use. Eventually, Franklin developed a motor to move gasoline and founded FE Petro in 1988 (which would later be called Franklin Fueling Systems). Franklin would continue to expand its fueling and water businesses through acquisitions and organic growth throughout the years. In 2017, Franklin announced the acquisition of three distributors and formed Headwater Companies, LLC. Headwater has also continued to grow through acquisitions.

== Primary Businesses ==
=== Global Water Systems ===
Franklin offers pumps, motors, drives, and controls for use in a variety of residential, commercial, agricultural, industrial, and municipal installations, for both clean and grey water applications.

==== Acquisitions ====
- JBD (Former pump line of Jacuzzi) – 2004
- Pioneer Pump – 2005
- Little Giant – 2006
- Denorco – 2007
- Monarch Industries (Pump Division only) – 2007
- Schneider Motobombas – 2008
- Western Pumps – 2008
- Vertical – 2009
- Impo – 2011
- Cerus – 2012
- Bombas Leão – 2014
- Pluga – 2014
- RotorPump – 2018
- Sterling / Avid – 2019
- CPS Pumps – 2020

=== Global Energy Systems ===
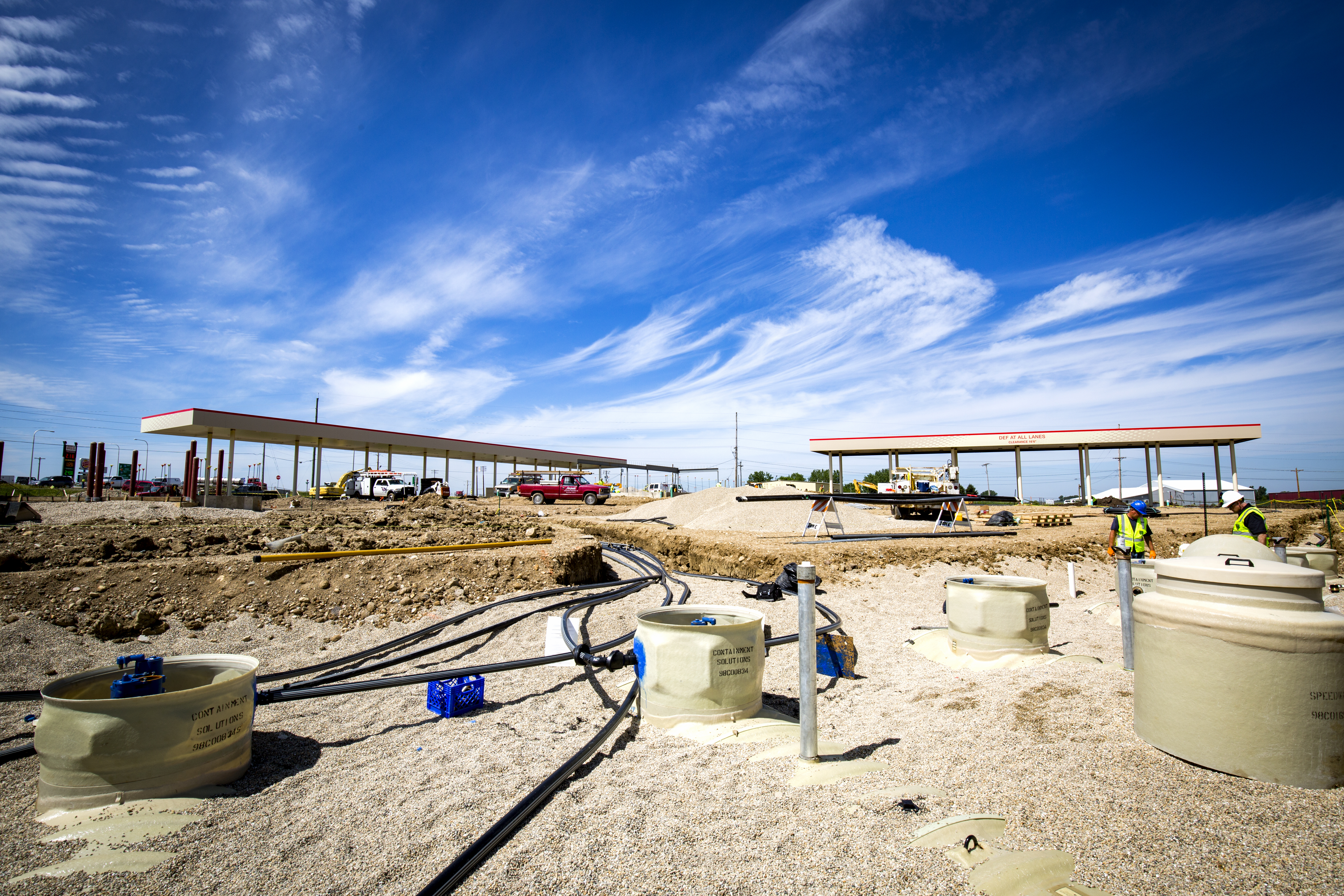
Franklin Fueling Systems installation in Peru, Illinois

FE Petro introduced devices such as variable length pumps and the Mag Shell pump. Through acquisitions, Franklin Fueling Systems offers complete fueling systems.

==== Acquisitions ====
- EBW, Inc – 2000
- APT, Inc – 2000
- INCON – 2002
- Phil-Tite Industries – 2005
- Healy – 2006
- PetroTechnik – 2010
- Flex-ing – 2012
- Wadcorpp – 2014
- Midtronics (Stationary Power Division) – 2018

=== Distribution ===
Headwater Companies, LLC is a collection of groundwater distributors. They provide various products and brands to contractors within the USA.

==== Acquisitions ====
- 2M Company – 2017
- Western Hydro – 2017
- DSI – 2017
- 2MDSI – 2017
- Valley Farm Supply – 2018
- Milan Supply Company – 2019
- Kokomo Pump Supply – 2019
- Gicon Pumps - 2021
- Blake Equipment - 2022
