= Schneider Electric =

French multinational industrial company

Schneider Electric SE

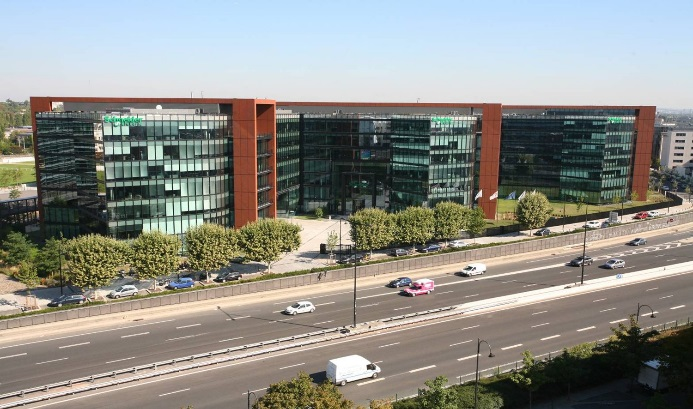
- Schneider Electric head office in Rueil-Malmaison
- Type: Public
- Traded as: Euronext Paris: SU; CAC 40 component
- Industry: Electrical equipment
- Predecessor: Schneider-Creusot
- Founded: 1836; 190 years ago (as Schneider & Cie)
- Founders: Eugène Schneider Adolphe Schneider
- Headquarters: Rueil-Malmaison, France
- Area served: Worldwide
- Key people: Olivier Blum (CEO); Jean-Pascal Tricoire (chairman)
- Products: Building automation, home automation, switches, and sockets, plant process and emergency shutdown systems, industrial control systems, electric power distribution, electrical grid automation, smart grid, critical power & cooling for datacenters, energy management software
- Revenue: ▲€40.15 billion (2025)
- Operating income: ▲€6.69 billion (2025)
- Net income: ▼€4.35 billion (2025)
- Total assets: ▼€62.50 billion (2025)
- Total equity: ▼€24.45 billion (2025)
- Number of employees: 177,000 (2024)
- Subsidiaries: Luminous Power Technologies Pvt Ltd., invensys, SolveIT Software, APC, Areva T&D, BEI Technologies, Cimac, Citect, Clipsal, ELAU, Federal Pioneer, Merlin Gerin, Merten, Modicon PLC, Lauritz Knudsen, Nu-Lec Industries, PDL Group, Power Measurement, Square D, TAC, Telemecanique, Telvent, Zicom, Summit, Xantrex
- Website: www.se.com

Schneider Electric SE is a French multinational corporation that specializes in energy technology, covering electrification, automation, and digitalization for industry and homes.

Registered as a Societas Europaea, Schneider Electric is a Fortune Global 500 company, publicly traded on the Euronext Exchange, and is a component of the Euro Stoxx 50 stock market index. In fiscal year 2024, the company posted revenues of €38.15 billion.

Schneider Electric is the parent company of Square D, APC, AVEVA, and others. It is also a research company.

Schneider Electric was recognized as the most sustainable company in Corporate Knights's The Global 100 index in 2025.

== History ==
=== 1836–1963 ===
In 1836, brothers Adolphe and Joseph-Eugene Schneider took over an iron foundry in Le Creusot, France. Two years later, they founded Schneider-Creusot, the company that would eventually become Schneider Electric. Initially, Schneider-Creusot specialized in the production of steel, heavy machinery, and transportation equipment. In 1871, following France's defeat in the Franco-Prussian War, the company significantly developed its capacity for weapons manufacturing. Over the first half of the 20th century, Schneider-Creusot continued to grow, establishing manufacturing sites in France and abroad, including in pre-Soviet Russia and Czechoslovakia.

=== 1963–1999 ===
Logo as of 1996

In the 1960s, following the death of Charles Schneider, Schneider-Creusot was absorbed by Belgium's Empain group, which merged Schneider-Creusot with its corporate structures to form Empain-Schneider. In 1981, the Empain family sold its controlling stake to Paribas. In the 1980s and 1990s, the company, once again operating under the Schneider name, divested from steel and shipbuilding and, through strategic acquisitions, began to focus on the electricity sector. These acquisitions included Télémécanique in 1988, Square D in 1991, and Merlin Gerin in 1992. In 1996, the company created the holding company Schneider Electric (China) Investment Company Ltd.

=== 1999–present ===
In January 1999, Schneider acquired the Scandinavian switch-maker Lexel. Later that year, the company renamed itself Schneider Electric, to reflect its focus on the electricity sector. In 2000, Schneider Electric acquired the French controls-maker Crouzet Automatismes from Thomson-CSF and the Swiss motion control specialist SIG Positec from SIG Group.

In October 2006, Schneider Electric announced that it would acquire the data center equipment manufacturer American Power Conversion for $6.1 billion. The following February, the move was finalized following its approval by the European Commission. In June 2010, Schneider and the rolling stock manufacturer Alstom jointly purchased Areva's transmission and distribution businesses in a transaction totaling $2.73 billion.

In 2016, Schneider acquired Tower Electric, a British company that manufactured fixings and fastenings for construction and electrical firms. In 2017, Schneider Electric became the majority shareholder of Aveva, a provider of engineering and industrial software based in the UK. The next year, it acquired the Indian multinational Larsen & Toubro's electrical and automatic business in a cash deal for ₹140 billion (US$1.5 billion).

In February 2020, Schneider made a €1.4 billion takeover bid for German company RIB Software, closing the deal in July 2020. Also in 2020, Schneider Electric acquired ProLeiT AG, a supplier of industrial control and MES software.

In January 2023, Schneider Electric's acquisition of Aveva was finalized.

In November 2023, Schneider Electric finalized its acquisition of EcoAct, a company devoted to climate consulting and net-zero solutions.

After 18 months in office, CEO Peter Herweck was removed by the board of directors and replaced with Olivier Blum in early November 2024.

In October 2024, Schneider Electric signed an agreement to acquire a controlling interest in Motivair Corporation, a company specialized in liquid cooling and advanced thermal management solutions for data centers.

In December 2024, the company announced a partnership with Nvidia to design data center cooling systems.

In March 2025, Schneider Electric announced plans to invest more than US$700 million in its United States operations through 2027, marking the company's largest single capital expenditure in the country.

In October 2026, Schneider Electric agreed to buy the industrial software maker PTC in an all-cash deal, valuing PTC at $22.6 billion. The deal is expected to help bolster Schneider Electric's data center business and is the company's largest ever acquisition.

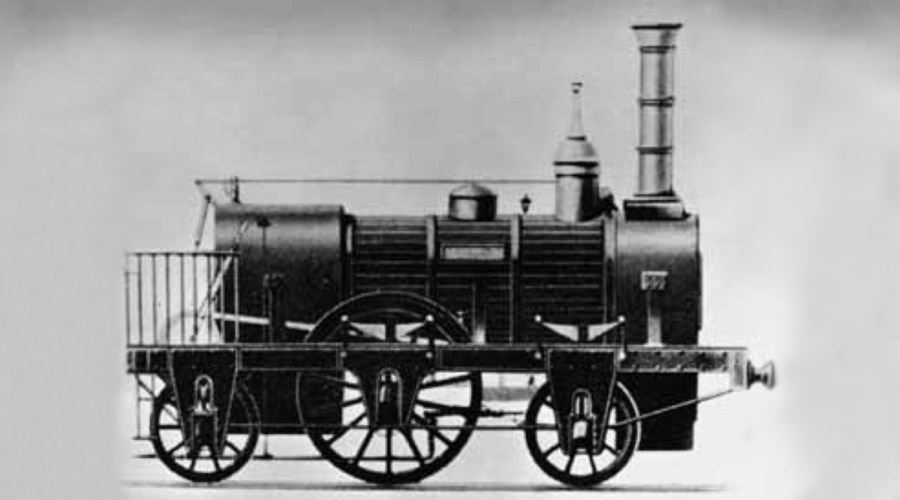
1838: "La Gironde", the first French locomotive

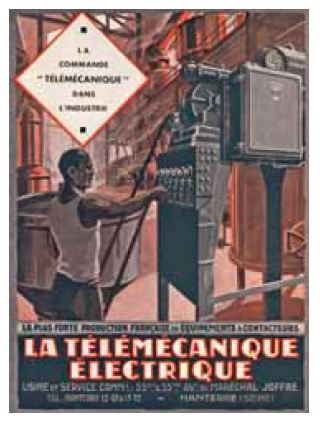
One of the first brochures for Telemecanique industrial control products. Telemecanique was acquired by Schneider Electric in 1988.

== Finances ==
	2019	2020	2021	2022	2023	2024	2025
Total revenue (€ millions)	27,158	25,159	28,905	34,176	35,902	38,153	40,152
Operating profit (€ millions)	4,011	3,669	4,554	5,543	5,958	6,555	7,047
Net profit (€ millions)	2,416	2,126	3,204	3,477	4,003	4,269	4,163
Total assets (€ millions)	45,003	49,482	54,547	58,899	58,899	65,943	62,504
Total equity (€ millions)	23,140	23,727	28,109	26,094	27,168	31,280	24,455
Employees	134,291	126,328	147,468	149,812	153,121	167,495	173,626

== Acquisitions ==
Acquisition date	Company	Business	Country	Ref.
1988	Télémécanique	Manufacturer of electrical circuit breakers, switchgear, and sensors	France	
1991	Square D	Manufacturer of electrical circuit breakers, switchgear, and transformers	USA	
1992	Merlin Gerin	Manufacturer of electrical circuit breakers and transformers	France	
1997	Modicon	Manufacturer of programmable logic controllers (PLC)	USA	
2001	PDL	Domestic and industrial electrical hardware	New Zealand	
June 2003	TAC	Building automation and control	Sweden	
March 2004	Kavlico	Pressure sensors	USA	
2004	Clipsal	Wiring	Australia	
June 2005	Juno Lighting	Lighting	USA	
July 2005	BEI Technologies	Customized sensors	USA	
2006	Merten	Ultra terminal	Germany	
2006	Citect	SCADA system and MES automation software	Australia	
February 2007	American Power Conversion	Power backup and protection and electrical distribution	USA	
July 2009	Meher Capacitors	Power factor correction	India	
March 2010	Zicom Security Systems	Security systems	India	
April 2010	SCADAgroup	SCADA and control systems	Australia	
December 2010	Areva T&D	Transmission & distribution	Europe	
March 2011	Summit Energy	Energy management	USA	
April 2011	Digilink	Network connectivity products	India	
May 2011	APW President Systems	Enclosure systems	India	
May 2011	Luminous	Power inverters	India	
June 2011	Telvent	Real-time information management systems	Spain	
December 2011	Viridity	Data center management software	USA	
September 2012	SolveIT Software	Planning and scheduling software	Australia	
January 2014	Invensys	Multinational engineering and information technology company	UK	
January 2014	Foxboro	Control systems	USA	
July 2017	ASCO	Transfer switches, power control systems, and industrial control products	USA	
September 2017 (60% controlling stake)	Aveva Group	Information-technology/consulting group	UK	
January 2023 (remaining shares)	Aveva Group	Information-technology/consulting group	UK	
November 2020	ETAP	Electrical power systems software	USA	
2020	RIB Software	AEC software	USA	
2020	OSISoft	Industrial data software	USA	
2020	Lauritz Knudsen E&A	Electrical and automation technology	India	
January 2022	Zeigo	Climate-tech platform	UK	
June 2022	EV Connect	Electric vehicle charging platform	USA	
2022	EnergySage	Marketplace for solar panels	USA	
2022	AutoGrid	Distributed energy resource management	USA	
November 2023	EcoAct	Climate consultancy and Nature-Based Solutions	France	
October 2024	Motivair	Liquid cooling and advanced thermal management solutions	USA	

== See also ==
- Creusot steam hammer
