= MTL =

MTL may refer to:

- An abbreviation and nickname for the city of Montreal, Quebec
- The Montreal Canadiens, a National Hockey League team based in Montreal.
- CF Montréal, a Major League Soccer team based in Montreal.
- The Montreal Alouettes, a Canadian Football League team based in Montreal.
- An abbreviation of Mount Laurel Township, New Jersey
- The official abbreviation for the Muldentalkreis district in the Free State of Saxony, Germany
- The ISO 4217 code for the Maltese lira, the former currency of Malta
- First language or mother tongue language
- Master of Teaching and Learning postgraduate degree
- Mary Todd Lincoln (1818–1882), wife of Abraham Lincoln and the First Lady of the United States
- Maitland Airport in Australia
- Mortlake railway station in London, England (National Rail station code)
- RAF-Avia, ICAO code
- An initialism for Military Training Leader
- Marc Tessier-Lavigne, the 11th President of Stanford University
- Materials Technology Laboratory, a defunct research facility under the United States Army Materiel Command

== Science and technology ==
- Machine translation, often abbreviated as "MTL"
- Material Template Library, a 3D graphics format that describes the material(s) for an accompanying OBJ file
- Matrix Template Library, a linear algebra library for C++ programs
- Meteor Lake, a CPU lineup from Intel
- Microsystems Technology Laboratories at the Massachusetts Institute of Technology
- Model transformation language, a generic term for various languages to perform transformations on mathematical models
- Monoidal t-norm logic, the logic of left-continuous t-norms
- Japan Median Tectonic Line, Japan's largest seismic fault system
- Medial temporal lobe, a brain region involved in learning and memory
- Merged transistor logic, a class of digital circuits
- Metric temporal logic, in computer science
- Multi-task learning
- MTL Harbor Tugboats

== Products and companies ==
- Metals Exploration plc (AIM: MTL), a British gold production and exploration company
- Modern Terminals Limited, a container terminal operator in Hong Kong
- MTL (transport company), a former Merseyside-based bus, coach and train operator in the United Kingdom
- MTL Instruments Group
