= Cooper Industries =

American worldwide electrical products manufacturer

Cooper Industries Inc.
- Type: Subsidiary
- Industry: Electrical Products Manufacturing
- Founded: Mount Vernon, Ohio, United States (1833)
- Founder: Charles Cooper; Elias Cooper
- Fate: Acquired by Eaton Corporation in 2012
- Successor: Eaton Corporation; Signify N.V.
- Headquarters: Houston, Texas, United States
- Key people: Kirk S. Hachigian, CEO & Chairman
- Products: Electrical equipment
- Revenue: ▲US$5,409.4 million (2011)
- Net income: ▲US$827.6 million (2011)
- Number of employees: 26,000 (2011)
- Website: cooperlighting.com

Cooper Industries was an American worldwide electrical products manufacturer headquartered in Houston, Texas. Founded in 1833, the company had seven operating divisions including Bussmann electrical and electronic fuses; Crouse-Hinds and CEAG explosion-proof electrical equipment; Halo and Metalux lighting fixtures; and Kyle and McGraw-Edison power systems products.

In 2011, 59% of total sales were to customers in the industrial and utility end-markets and 40% of total sales were to customers outside the United States. Cooper has manufacturing facilities in 23 countries as of 2011.

On November 26, 2012, it was announced that the company will be replaced in the S&P 500 index, since its takeover by Eaton Corporation.

== History ==
Cooper Industries was founded in 1833 by brothers Charles and Elias Cooper. The company started as a foundry located in Mt. Vernon, Ohio, and was initially called the C&E Cooper Company. Cooper's initial product offerings included plows, hog troughs, kettles and stoves. By the mid-nineteenth century the company was concentrating on steam engines.

As the use of steam power declined in the late 1800s, Cooper again shifted its focus, this time to gas engine technology. By the time the 20th century arrived, Cooper Industries had become the American leader in pipeline compression engines, products that enabled the development of the growing oil and gas industry. This period was also highlighted by a merger with Bessemer Gas Engine Company, yielding Cooper-Bessemer.

In the 1940s, Cooper-Bessemer played a role in the U.S. World War II effort, supplying engine components that powered almost all of the ships in the Navy's minesweeper fleet, as well as the famous Liberty Ships, which carried 75% of the cargo used by Allied armed forces. After the war, Cooper-Bessemer again embarked on an effort to diversify itself in a changing world economy.

As the company looked to increase its product portfolio, Cooper expanded its offering into electrical products, electrical power equipment, automotive products, tools and hardware. A detailed history of the expansion in the 1950s through early 1980s is given in Keller 1983, a history commissioned by the company for its 150th anniversary. Acquisitions in the 1980s included Crouse-Hinds (1981) and McGraw-Edison (1985).

In the last decade of the 20th century, Cooper underwent a period of portfolio rationalization, reducing its exposure to more cyclical industries such as automotive and petroleum. Ultimately, Cooper emerged focused on the two business segments that remain in the portfolio today – Electrical Products Group and Energy and Safety Solutions. On May 23, 2002, Cooper Industries Inc had completed reincorporation in Bermuda from Ohio.

In February 2008, Cooper Industries announced its acquisition of MTL Instruments Group. On November 30, 2012, Eaton announced its completion of acquisition of Cooper Industries.

In March 2020, Eaton announced the sale of its lighting business to Signify N.V., the company that was formed from the spin-off of Philips' lighting division

== Divisions ==
Cooper Industries was acquired by Eaton Corporation in 2012. The divisions are undergoing name changes as a result.

=== Cooper Lighting Solutions ===
Cooper Lighting Solutions manufactures lighting fixtures and related products to worldwide commercial, industrial, residential and utility markets. This includes track and recessed lighting (LED, fluorescent, H.I.D.), exit and emergency, vandal-resistant, landscape and complex environment lighting. Cooper Lighting Solutions manufactures lighting fixtures under several brands, many of which were the result of acquisitions. These brands include:

- Corelite
- Fail-Safe
- Halo
- IRiS
- Lumark
- McGraw-Edison
- Metalux
- Neo-Ray
- Portfolio
- RSA
- Sure-Lites
- Shaper
- Streetworks

=== Eaton's B-line Business ===
Eaton's B-Line Business (formerly Cooper B-Line) is a global provider of support systems and enclosure solutions for engineered facility subsystem applications in various markets: commercial, industrial, utility and OEM.

=== Eaton's Bussmann Business ===
Eaton's Bussmann Business (formerly Cooper Bussmann) manufactures and markets a wide variety of North American and European-styled fuses for the electrical, electronics and transportation industries. The company also produces industrial and mobile wireless solutions, plus inductors and transformers for power quality in electronics applications. Bussmann's main industrial manufacturing facilities are located in the United States (Black Mountain and Goldsboro NC, Chicago IL, Ellisville MO, Boca Raton FL), in Mexico (Juarez and Mexico City), in UK (Workington and Burton-on-the-Wolds), in Hungary (Győr), Xi’an (China), India (Pondicherry), Costa Rica (San Jose), Brazil (Itu).

Business Units

- Electrical - Serving infrastructure, automation, renewable energy and transportation/high reliability
- Electronics - Serving renewable energy, automation and transportation/high reliability, computers, communications and consumer
- Transportation - Serving hybrid/electric vehicles, traction
- Wireless - Serving transportation, heavy duty/off-road, and industrial
- Consumer - Serving automotive aftermarket and hardware/home center

=== Eaton's Cooper Safety Business ===
Eaton's Cooper Safety Business (formerly Cooper Safety) specializes in notification, alarm and safety systems. This includes emergency lighting, fire detection and alarm systems, hazardous area communications, life safety notifications, mains lighting and security systems. Cooper notification acquired Wheelock inc. In 2006.

=== Eaton's Cooper Wiring Devices Business ===
Eaton's Cooper Wiring Devices Business (formerly Cooper Wiring Devices) works closely with Eaton's Cooper Lighting Business. The company has acquired well known brands like Eagle Electric, Arrow Hart, ArrowLink, RhinoBox, Aspire, Aspire RF, and MediaSync. The companies products include cable assemblies, data connectors for military, home and commercial, lighting switches, outlets, receptacles, subsea wiring and communications ports.

=== Eaton's Cooper Power Systems Business ===
Eaton's Cooper Power Systems Business (formerly Cooper Power Systems) a subsidiary of Cooper Industries is a global manufacturer and provider of power delivery apparatus for the utility, commercial, and industrial markets in the medium voltage and high voltage ranges.

The company provides products and services required to transform, protect, connect, and build out an electric power system backbone. Reliability and grid-point solutions include: Integrated Volt/Var Control (IVVC), feeder, and substation automation systems. Endpoint solutions include: Advanced Metering Infrastructure (AMI) and Demand Response (DR). Additionally the company provides engineering optimization and modeling tools.

=== Eaton's Crouse-Hinds Business ===
Eaton's Crouse-Hinds Business (formerly Cooper Crouse-Hinds) specializes in explosion proof and hazardous environments

== Joint ventures ==
=== Apex Tool Group ===
Apex Tool Group was formed in July 2010 as a joint venture of two manufacturers, Danaher Tool Group and the Cooper Hand Tools division of Cooper Industries. The two businesses offer industrial, commercial, and do-it-yourself customers a selection of over 30 leading brands, including Crescent, GearWrench, Armstrong, and Weller.

In October 2012, Danaher Corporation and Cooper Industries sold the Apex Tool Group to Bain Capital for a fee of around $1.6 billion.

== Cooper Industries CEOs ==
- Charles Cooper 1833-1895 (chairman from 1895 incorporation to his death in 1901)
- Frank L. Fairchild 1895-1912
- Charles Gray "C.G." Cooper 1912-1919 (chairman to 1922)
- Desault B. Kirk 1919-1920
- Beatty B. Williams 1920-1940 and 1941-1943 (chairman 1940-1956)
- Charles B. Jahnke 1940-1941
- Gordon Lefebvre 1943-1955
- Lawrence F. Williams 1955-1957 (chairman 1956-1959)
- Eugene L. Miller 1957-1975 (chairman 1971-1983)
- Robert Cizik 1975-1995 (chairman 1983-1996)
- H. John Riley Jr. 1995-2005 (chairman 1996-2006)
- Kirk S. Hachigian 2005- 2012

== See also ==
- MTL Instruments Group
