= LADA Ellada =

Lada Ellada
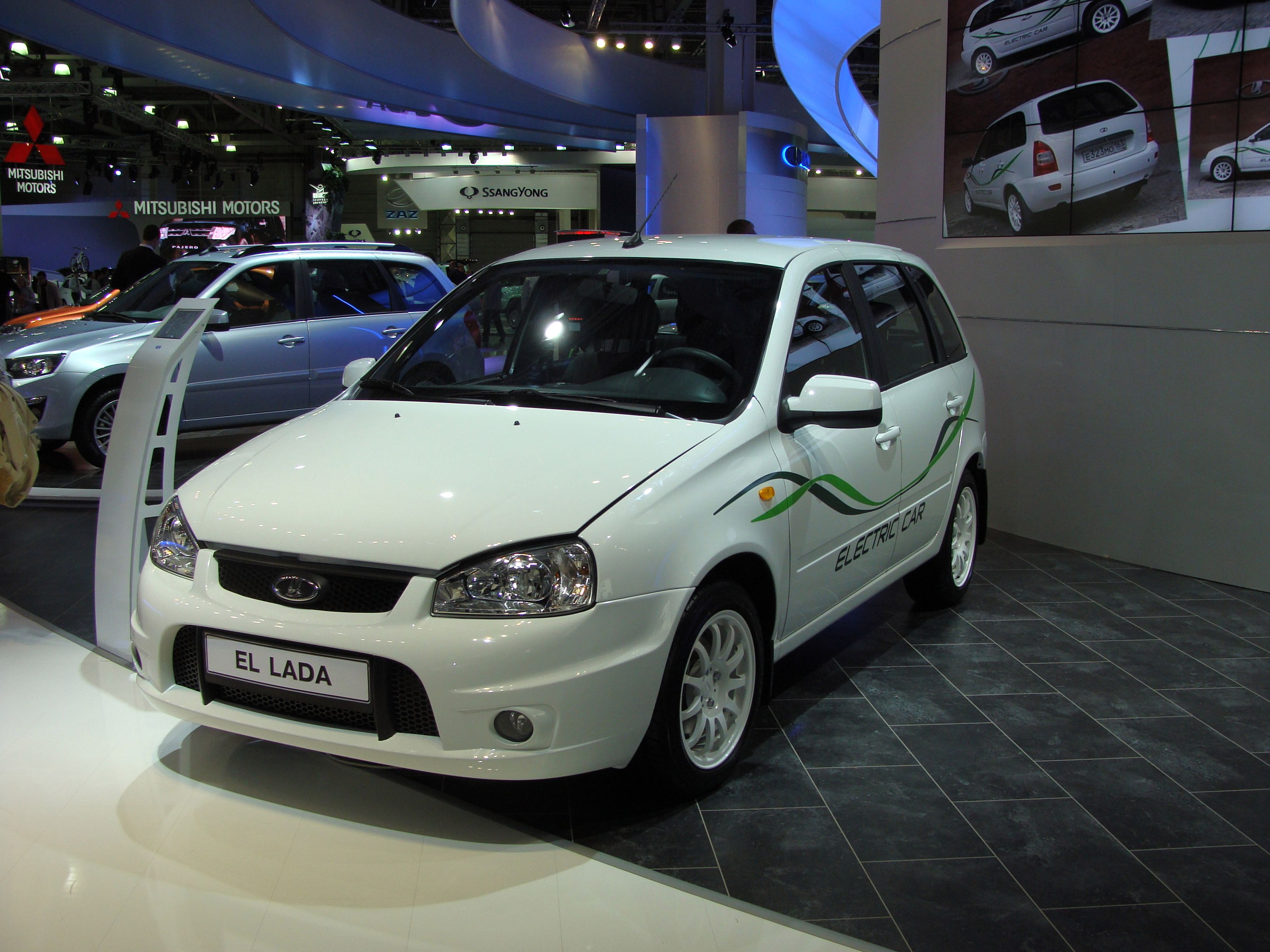

Overview
- Manufacturer: AvtoVAZ
- Also called: VAZ-1817
- Production: 2012-2013
- Assembly: Russia: Tolyatti

Body and chassis
- Class: B-segment
- Layout: Front engine, front-wheel drive

Powertrain
- Power output: 60 kW (80 hp)
- Battery: 23 kWh LFP
- Electric range: 45–200 km (28–124 mi)

Chronology
- Successor: LADA Vesta EV

The LADA Ellada (also known as EL Lada) is the first serial Russian electric car produced by AvtoVAZ, with approximately 100 prototype cars made. It is built on the LADA Kalina chassis. It was publicly launched in 2011.

== History ==
The project was developed and promoted by Evgeny Shmelev, Sergey Kurdyuk, Sergey Amanov, Alexander Sviridov (project manager for the production of the prototype batch), Sergey Ivlev (AvtoVAZ); Georgy Efremov and Dmitry Tolmachev (Stavropol Krai).

Development cost 10 million euro, and the cost of a production model is 1.25 million rubles (30,000 euro as of early 2013).

In December 2012, it was announced that about 100 vehicles would be delivered to Stavropol Krai, where they would be used as taxis, with the Stavropol administration being required to subsidize half of the cost of each vehicle. On January 22, 2013, AvtoVAZ shipped the first five LADA Ellada electric vehicles from the batch to the “Автоколонна 1721” (Avtokolonna 1721) transport company in the spa city of Kislovodsk. However, due to disagreements between the Stavropol administration and AvtoVAZ, further deliveries were not made. In addition, the administration failed to build the necessary charging station infrastructure — there were only three stations in all of Kislovodsk. The company Ensto served as a partner in the construction of charging stations. By 2015, five vehicles used as taxis had traveled 50,000–70,000 km each.

A prototype batch of 100 vehicles was nevertheless produced.

Forty cars were transferred to dealers in the Central and Southern Federal Districts as test vehicles — to gauge demand — while another 40 remained at AvtoVAZ. In early January 2014, it was decided to sell the electric vehicles to dealers at near-cost — 960,000 rubles — but sales were limited to legal entities (so that the plant could monitor the vehicles’ operation).

It is known that the first private vehicle was purchased by the head of Rostec S. V. Chemezov; in addition, the car was acquired by the King of Jordan in 2012, and in 2014, the car was purchased by the head of the Ministry of Industry and Trade Denis Manturov.

== Specifications ==
The electric vehicle uses lithium iron phosphate batteries with an energy capacity of 23 kWh, a service life of 3,000 cycles and a total weight of 2×120=240 kg. A single battery charge provides an estimated range of 140 km. Charging time from a household power outlet is eight hours.

The electric motor and associated on-board electronics were developed by the Swiss company MES, and the onboard charger is also from Switzerland, from the company Brusa Elektronik. The batteries are manufactured in China.

The design originally called for batteries from the Russian company Liotech, but ultimately, the production LADA’s battery pack consists of 79 compact batteries from the Chinese company Thunder Sky.

== Performance ==
The model’s official range on a single charge is 150 km. As demonstrated by the operation of test vehicles as taxis in Kislovodsk, this range is maintained only at above-freezing temperatures; at low temperatures (at least down to −5 °C), battery capacity decreases significantly, reducing the range to 100 km, and when the heater, defroster, and seat warmers are turned on — to 50–70 km. In addition, driving style and the use of lighting affect range — for example, in the least economical mode, the charge lasts for 45 km.

The factory was also conducting research on the impact of different types of tires on fuel consumption, and, as tests by the magazine “За Рулем” have shown, the driving range can vary by 30 km depending on the tires.

During a road trip from Krasnodar to Anapa, the electric vehicles covered 207 kilometers without recharging. At the same time, according to automotive journalists, the car is economical — in 2014, the cost of a full battery charge would be about 80 rubles (battery capacity is 23 kWh, cost per kilowatt-hour for individuals in Kislovodsk was 3.44 rubles).

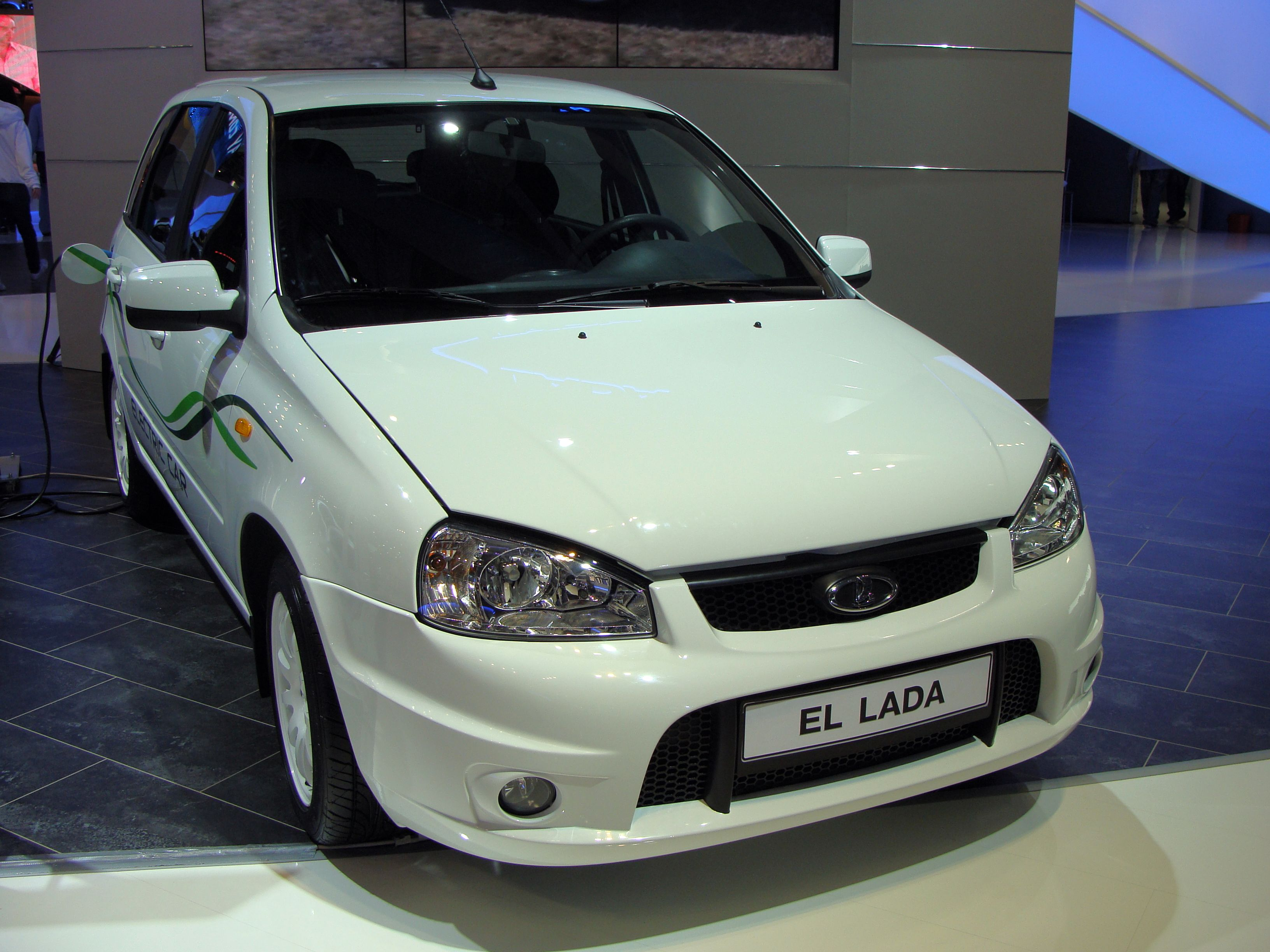
LADA Ellada

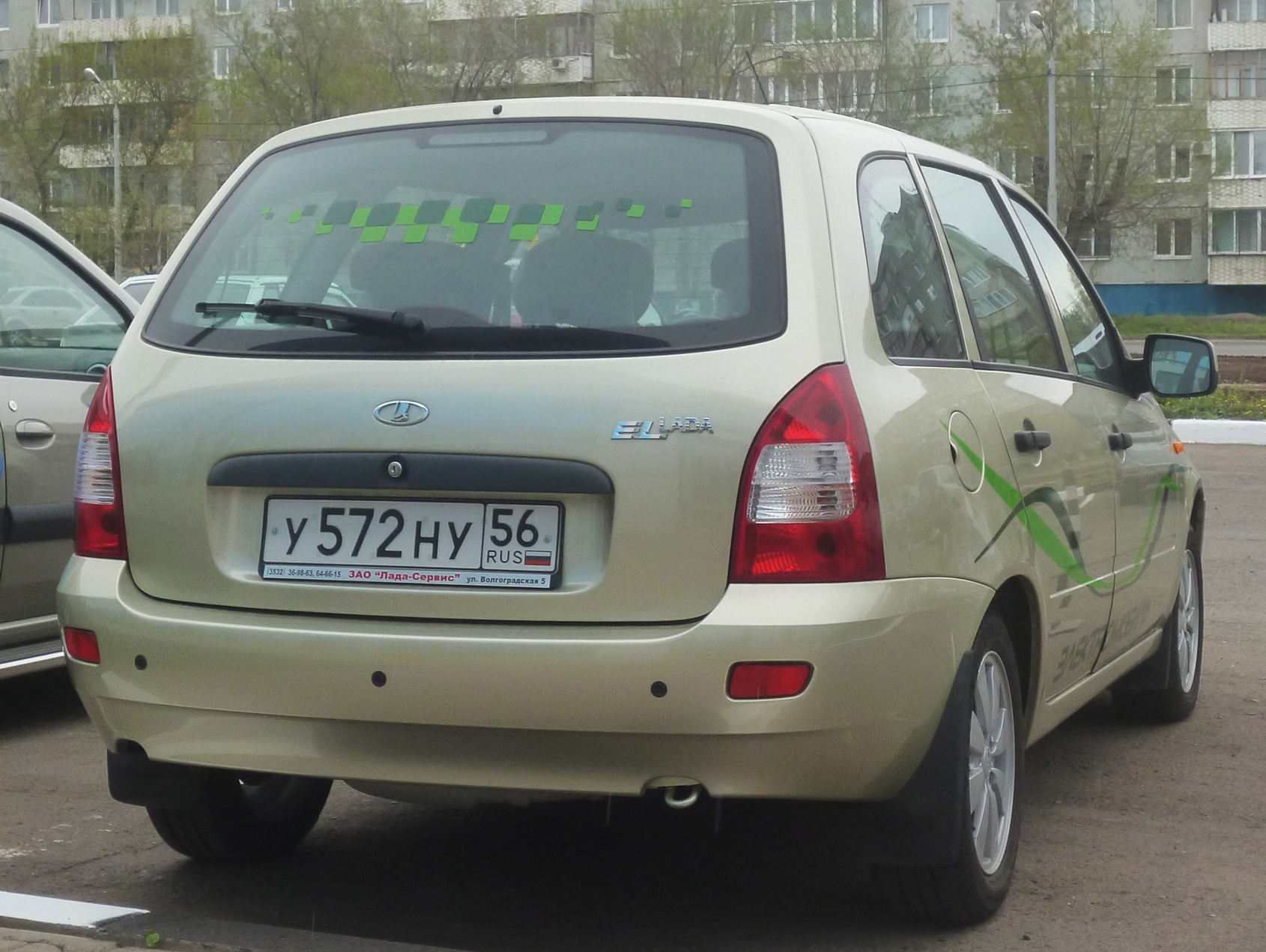
Rear view

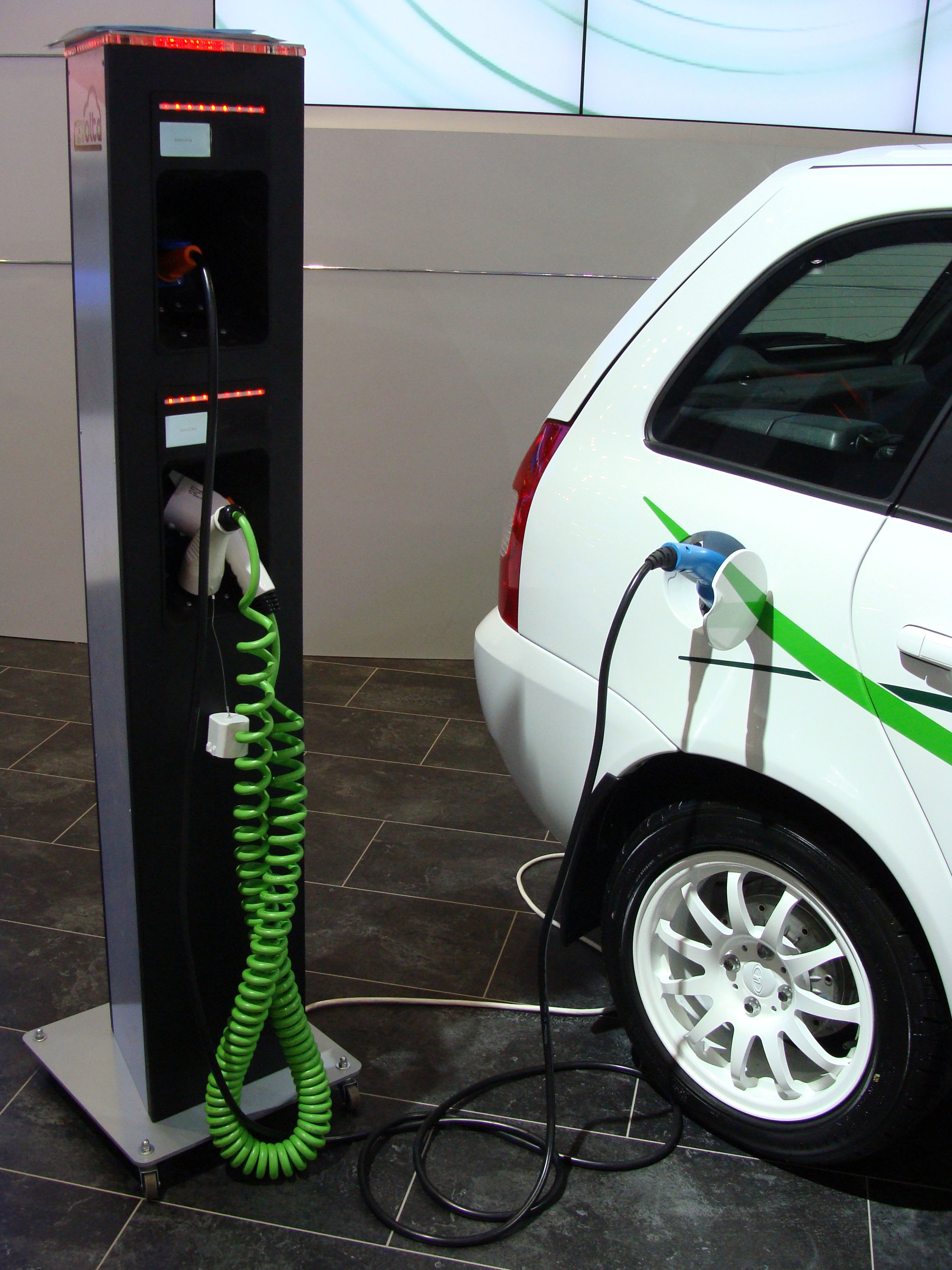
EVCS

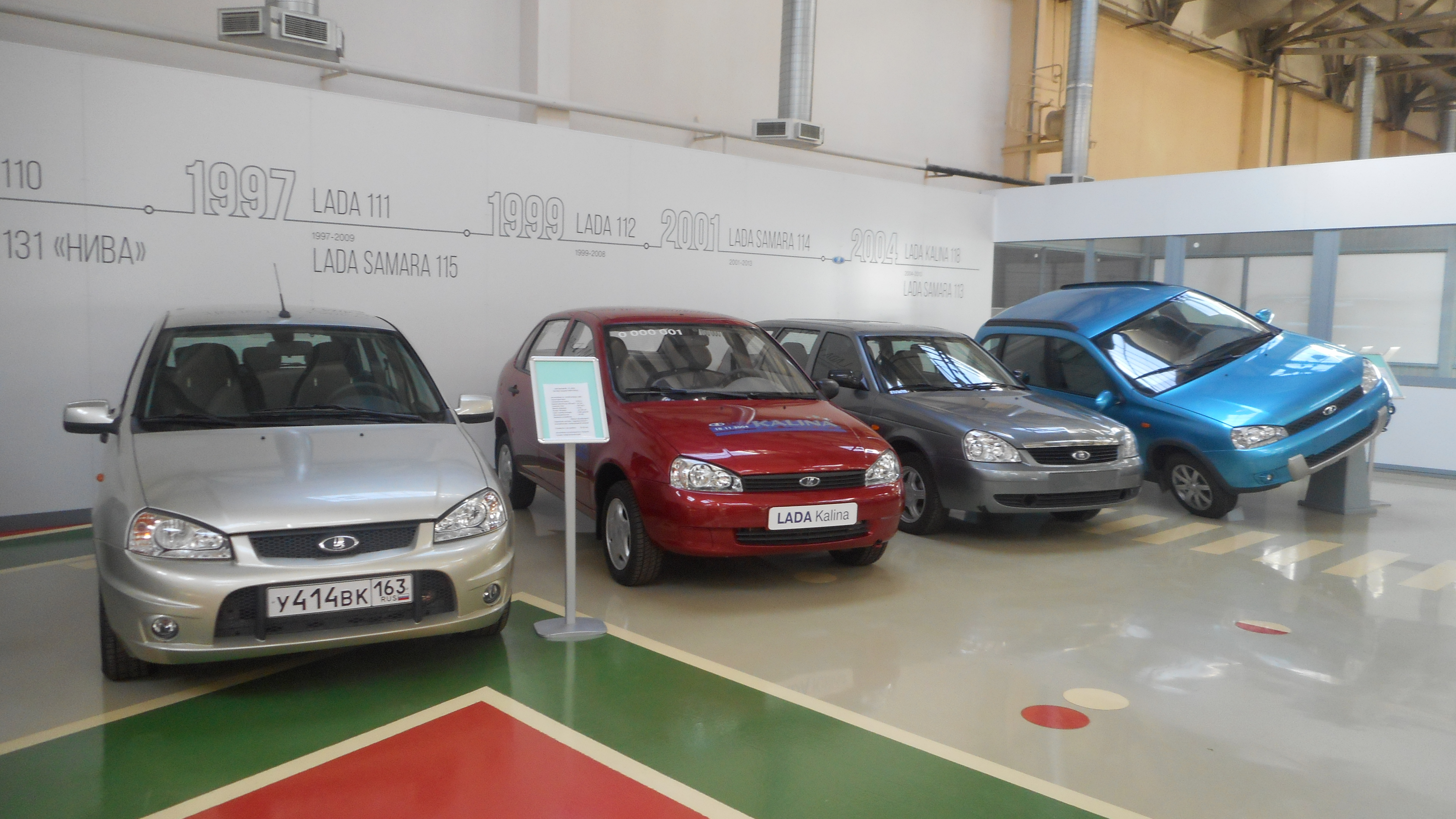
El Lada, AutoVAZ history museum

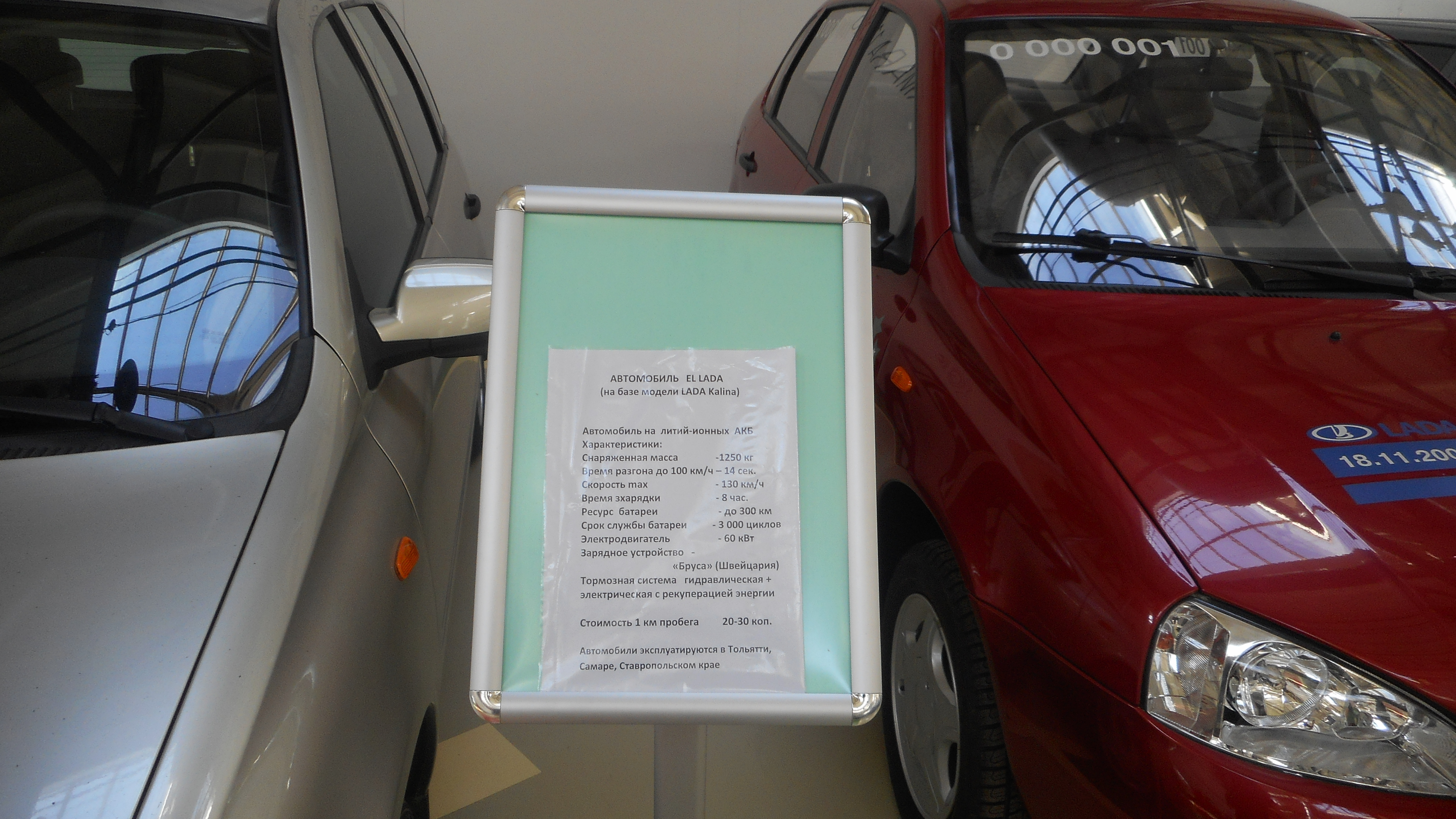
El Lada, AutoVAZ history museum
