= Legrand (company) =

French company

Legrand S.A.
- Type: Public
- Traded as: Euronext: LR; CAC 40 component
- ISIN: FR0010307819
- Industry: Electrical equipment, Network equipment
- Founded: 1865; 161 years ago
- Founder: Frédéric Legrand
- Headquarters: Limoges, France
- Key people: Benoît Coquart (CEO)
- Revenue: ▲€9.48 billion (2025)
- Operating income: ▲€1.80 billion (2025)
- Net income: ▲€1.24 billion (2025)
- Total assets: ▲€17.59 billion (2025)
- Total equity: ▲€7.33 billion (2025)
- Number of employees: ~ 38,000 (2023)

Legrand S.A. is a French industrial group historically based in Limoges in the Nouvelle-Aquitaine region.

Legrand is established in 90 countries and its products are distributed in nearly 180 countries. It generates 85% of its sales internationally. The group has expanded its product range in sustainable development and energy saving technologies, and has developed new products for EV charging/electric vehicles, lighting control and data centers.

== History ==
=== Origins ===
The company's origins date back to 1865, when a Limoges porcelain (in France's Limousin region) workshop was set up on the route to Lyon originally making porcelain dishes. In 1904, the company was taken over by Frédéric Legrand who gave his name to the company. In 1919, the company entered into a partnership with an artisan from Limoges, Jean Mondot, who had started a small factory in Exideuil making electric switches using porcelain and boxwood.

Manufacturing subsequently gradually diversified into electrical equipment. At that time, before the appearance of plastic, porcelain was the best available insulating material. In 1949, following a factory fire, the decision was made to exclusively concentrate on electrical wiring devices (switches and sockets). The company very quickly extended its range to cover protection products (fuse-holders and circuit breakers, etc.), cable management products (trunking and mini-trunking), emergency lighting, etc.

Legrand is a manufacturer of electrical and digital building infrastructure products and connected devices, with a portfolio of more than 300,000 products. As of 2021, the company had operations in 90 countries and sold its products in 180 countries.

Some notable dates:

=== Internationalization in the second half of the 20th century ===
1966: First subsidiary outside France established in Belgium.

1970: Legrand was listed on the Paris stock exchange for the first time.

1977: Development outside Europe with the takeover of Pial in Brazil.

1980: Bought from GEC in Liverpool, UK. Plugs and sockets company formally Fluvent, transferred works to Milton Keynes, UK.

1984: First subsidiary in the United States with Pass & Seymour.

1989: Acquisition of Bticino, Italy's largest electrical equipment manufacturer.

1996: Acquired Fael in Poland, Luminex in Colombia, MDS in India, and WattStopper in the United States.

1998: Acquisition of Ortronics, a US leader in structured cabling and Voice Data Image (VDI).

2000: Acquisition of Wiremold in the United States (doubling the Group's size there), and Horton Controls, a US lighting controls company, merged into its WattStopper brand, and Quintela and Tegui in Spain.

=== Schneider-Legrand merger ===
2001: Brussels opposes the Schneider-Legrand merger.

=== Internationalization in the 21st century ===
2003: Purchase of the entire share capital by investment funds Kohlberg Kravis Roberts (KKR) and Wendel Investissement. Legrand is withdrawn from the quoted market.

2005: Acquisition of ICM Group (KZ and Cablofil brands), world leader in wire mesh cable trays.

2006: Acquisition of the electrical wiring devices division of TCL China (No. 1 in China) and Shidean, Chinese leader in audio and video door entry systems. Acquisition of Vantage Controls, US lighting control specialist. KKR and Wendel Investissement remain majority shareholders. At the end of 2006, the minority shareholders (banks and institutions) sold their holding via an accelerated private institutional placement, thereby taking traded shares to 35% of the capital and increasing the share's liquidity.

2007: Acquisition of HPM, No. 2 in electrical wiring devices in Australia, and Kontaktor, the leading Russian manufacturer of power circuit breakers. Took over MACSE, the Mexican leader in cable trays, UStec, US specialist in residential networks, TCL Wuxi, Chinese specialist in modular circuit breakers and Alpes Technologies (Annecy, France), specialist in energy compensation and measurement.

2008: Acquisition of PW Industries, a US cable tray specialist; HDL, the No. 1 in Brazil producer of residential access control (entry phones); Estap, the Turkish leader in VDI enclosures, and Electrak, UK specialist in ground-laid cable trays. The end of the shareholder pact between KKR and Wendel Investissement. Rumors of a possible takeover of Legrand by a competitor (Siemens, ABB or General Electric) abound. In April 2008, KKR and Wendel Investissement decided to renew their shareholder pact until 2012.

2009: Legrand was severely affected by the economic crisis. The group saw a 15.6% fall in its turnover (to €3.6 billion). It still managed to maintain its operating margin at 17.6%, as against 17.7% in 2008. A return to growth forecasted for the second half of 2010.

2010:

- The company returned to growth. Sales are up by 8.7%, operating income leaps by 35.5% and net income by 44.3% to €418.3 million. The group's operating margin reached previously unseen levels: 20.2%.
- Creation of the EV PLUG alliance between Legrand, Schneider Electric and Scame (Italy) to create a common, dominant standard in Europe for electric vehicle charging systems.
- Legrand acquires Inform in Istanbul, Turkey and IndoAsian Switchgear in India (specialist in modular circuit breakers). December 2010: takeover of the Italian company Meta System Energy, specialist in UPS.

2011: Legrand acquired the American company Electrorack, the French leader in independent living aids for dependent people. In May, Legrand acquired Middle Atlantic Products, a US company specializing in digital infrastructures. The same year, Legrand acquired the Spanish Neat.

2012: Electrical equipment major Numeric Power Systems sold its UPS (uninterruptible power supply) business to France's Legrand Group for a total of Rs 806.44 crore.

2013: Legrand signed a partnership with the Henry Becquerel High School. The same year, Legrand announced the acquisition of the French Intervox, as well as Tynetec, a UK-based company specializing in assisted living systems.

2014: In March, Legrand signs an agreement to acquire Lastar, Inc. a Moraine, Ohio cabling and connectivity products supplier which, in 2013, reported more than $140 million in revenue and had nearly 1,000 total employees in nine locations in the U.S., Europe and Asia. Brands falling under the Lastar umbrella are the Quiktron and Cables to Go which became C2G in 2012.

2015: Legrand North America acquires Raritan Inc., completed in September. The same year, Legrand acquires a stake in Netatmo, a French start-up based in Boulogne-Billancourt (Paris area) and specialized in Internet of Things (LoT). Netatmo has nearly 225 employees and generates annual sales of around €45 million in 2017.

2017: In June, Legrand started procedures to purchase Milestone AV, the manufacturer of AV racks and mounts in the US and overseas. Milestone manufactures products under the brand names Chief, Sanus, Echogear, Da-Lite, Projecta, and Vaddio. In November, Legrand North America acquired Server Technology.

2018: Legrand acquired the Chinese company Shenzhen Clever Electronic Co Ltd and merged with Netatmo. Same year, Legrand acquired a majority stake at Debflex, a leading French company specialized in the production of electrical equipment.

2019: Acquisition of Connectrac, floor-based cable management. Legrand acquired leading U.S. data center power system manufacturer American Universal Electric Corporation headquartered near Pittsburgh, Pennsylvania, and Jobo Smartech, a Chinese company of connected controls for hotel rooms.

2020: Acquisition of Focal Point LLC, a private architectural lighting manufacturer based in Chicago. The same year, Legrand and its subsidiary Netatmo expanded their offer dedicated to the connected home with technologies such as the connected eco meter and digital key. Legrand acquired the entire capital of Borri, a company in Italy.

2021: Acquisition of Ensto Building systems division of Ensto, a private electrification, lighting and EV charging manufacturer based in Finland, optical networking components provider Champion One, passive data communication specialist Compose, and Borri, a global provider of and single phase and three phase UPS systems. Legrand faced the risk of raw material shortages. Simultaneously, in a post-pandemic context, Legrand established record results, notably in the Data Center, Connected Products and Energy Efficiency sectors. Legrand launched a new brand "Legrand Care", a new structure that gathers Assisted Living and Healthcare brands. Legrand and the CEA Center in Grenoble unveiled a wireless and battery-free connected switch. Legrand announced that it would buy 450,000 of its own shares. Legrand acquired Emos, a company based in the Czech Republic. Legrand announced two acquisitions: Ensto Building Systems based in Provoo in Finland, and Ecotap based in Boxtel, the Netherlands.

In 2022, the company acquired UK cooling firms USystems, and French electrical power force company Voltadis. These acquisitions would be used to strengthen Legrand's position in the data centers sector. The same year, Legrand signed the EcoWatt charter of Réseau de Transport d'Électricité (the French Electricity Transmission Network), through which it committed to reduce its energy consumption and promote the reduction of energy consumption for individuals. In November, Legrand confirms the takeover of the German company A & H Meyer (specialist in connectors for commercial furniture), and the British company Power Control and also announced an increase in net income of 16.1% over the first 9 months of the year. In December, Legrand announced its acquisition of the Canadian company Encelium.

=== Failed takeover by Schneider Electric ===
In 2001, Legrand was subject to a friendly takeover bid by Schneider Electric for all of its capital. Schneider Electric acquired up to 98,1% of Legrand's capital. If minority stakeholders and eventually the company's management opposed the bid, a veto from the European Commission about competition issues would cause the transaction to definitely fail. The exchange of shares having been carried out, Schneider was forced to resell all of them. The shares were sold to venture capitalists Wendel Investissement and KKR.

== Corporate affairs ==
=== Corporate governance ===
==== The Latest CEO ====
- François Grappotte (born in 1936 in Reims): CEO from 1983 to 2006, honorary chairman of the board of directors since 2006.
- In 2007, Legrand appoints Thierry de La Tour d'Artaise, CEO of Groupe SEB, and Gérard Lamarche, CFO of Groupe Suez, to its board of directors.
- Gilles Schnepp (born in 1958 in Lyon): President and CEO between 2006 and 2018, and then president until 2020, joined the company in 1989, with a degree in business, ex vice-president of the American merchant bank Merrill Lynch France. He joined Groupe PSA as vice-chairman in 2019.
- Benoît Coquart (born 1973), general director since February 2018, joined the company in 1997, member of the board of directors since 2010.

==== President ====
- Angeles Garcia-Poveda, is chair of the Legrand Board of Directors from July 1, 2020.

=== Business figures ===
Financial data in € millions
Year	2019	2020	2021	2022
Turnover	6,600	///	6,990	8,340
Net income	834	904	1,434	999,5

== Products and services ==
Legrand has more than 300,000 references in a hundred product families.

Since 2010, as a player in the market of electrical equipment in the building industry, Legrand announced that it will enter the sectors of charging infrastructure for electric cars, and energy efficiency.

Legrand proposes services in home automation such as products with the Netatmo technology embedded used to manage operations on a remote control of electrical and heating appliances.

=== IoT and Home Automation ===
Legrand also specializes in IoT and Home automation. In 2016, the French company launched its connected door. In 2020, during the CES (Consumer Electronics Show) Legrand presented new products with energy efficiency for home automation.

=== Computing and Data Center ===
Legrand is present in the data center sector, notably with the following products: VDI (Virtual desktop infrastructure), PDUs (Power distribution unit), etc.

== Head office and factories ==
In France, Legrand has 8 production sites based near its headquarters in Limoges (Haute-Vienne).

In 2012, Legrand opened two training centers in the Paris region.

== Key competitors ==
- Eaton Corporation (Cooper Wiring Devices)
- Hubbell Incorporated
- Leviton
- Lutron Electronics Company

== See also ==
- Switchgear
