= Raritan Inc. =

Raritan
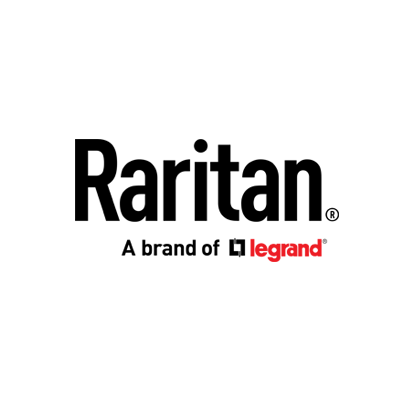
- Type: Subsidiary
- Industry: Information Technology and Services
- Founded: 1985
- Founder: Ching-I Hsu
- Headquarters: Somerset, New Jersey, U.S.
- Area served: Worldwide
- Key people: Doug Fikse; President; Swen Anderson; Chief Technology Office; Howard Hsieh; President, Raritan Taiwan; Henry Hsu; VP, Product Marketing and Marketing; Dan Moran; VP, Finance; Andy Schreiber; VP, Global Supply Chain Operations
- Products: Power Distribution, KVM Switches
- Number of employees: 200–500 (2015)
- Parent: Legrand
- Website: www.raritan.com

Raritan is a multinational technology company that manufactures hardware for data center power distribution, remote server management, and audio visual solutions. The company is headquartered in Somerset, New Jersey (which is located near Raritan, New Jersey), and has a commercial presence in over 76 countries. Raritan was acquired by Legrand in September 2015.

== History ==
Raritan was established in 1985, when the founder, Ching-I Hsu, and his wife, created a business reselling PC components out of their house. This later changed from reselling to manufacturing PCs. To make the manufacturing more efficient, Hsu developed the first KVM switch, a tool that provides a way to control numerous PCs from a single product. The KVM switch advanced Raritan as an international company and led to other company advancements.

Raritan entered the intelligent power business in 2007. Intelligent power management provides companies with an accurate measurement of the amount of energy devices use. This kind of power management is much more energy efficient because it consumes less energy/produces less heat, improves environmental conditions with sensors that adjust things like temperature and humidity levels, and overall decreases costs.

In 2008, Raritan's Data Center Infrastructure Management (DCIM) business began. This software provides the ability to better manage assets, change and capacity through monitoring of power, the environment, and energy use.

In June 2015, Legrand, North America announced an agreement to acquire Raritan. The scope of the acquisition would include Raritan's intelligent power and KVM businesses, while its Data Center Infrastructure Management (DCIM) software business would spin off into Sunbird Software, a new company and strategic partner of Raritan to be chaired by Ching-I Hsu, CEO and founder of Raritan. The acquisition was complete on September 28, 2015.
