= Coquart =

Coquart is a surname. Notable people with the surname include:

- Benoît Coquart (born 1973), French businessman and CEO
- Claude-Godefroy Coquart (1706–1765), French missionary
- Georges-Ernest Coquart (1831–1902), French architect
