= Server Technology =

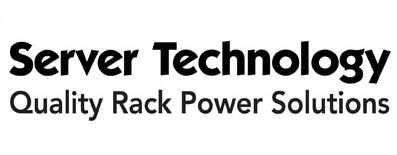
- Company type: Subsidiary
- Founded: 1984
- Headquarters: Reno, Nevada, U.S.
- Area served: Worldwide
- Products: Power Distribution
- Parent: Legrand

Server Technology, Inc. offers power distribution products for data centers, telecommunication equipment and remote administration. The company is headquartered in Reno, Nevada with offices in the United Kingdom, Germany, Hong Kong and India.

== History ==
Server Technology was founded in 1984, and by 1987 had grown large enough to acquire CrossPoint Systems, a manufacturer of PC data switches. In 1990, Server Technology introduced its first power and network control products.

Server Technology currently has 170+ employees with 16 offices worldwide.

In 2017 Legrand acquired Server Technology.

== Patents ==
Server Technology claims to have the largest patent library regarding power provision in zero-U and horizontal power distribution unit (PDU) configurations compatible with today's racks and dense computing infrastructure requirements. The company has been granted at least 48 patents and has at least 54 pending.

In June 2014, a Reno, Nevada jury awarded Server Technology, Inc. damages totaling $10,787,634 in an action for patent infringement brought against American Power Conversion Corporation (“APC”), a subsidiary of Schneider Electric SA (Euronext: SU). The Server Technology patents in suit are US Patent No. 7,043,543 (Vertical‐Mount Electrical Power Distribution Plugstrip) issued May 9, 2006, and US Patent No. 7,702,771 (Electrical Power Distribution Device Having A Current Display) issued April 20, 2010. This finding was overturned in the US Federal Court of Appeals in September 2016.

The complaint was filed in United States District Court for the Northern District of Nevada in December 2006. In February 2007, APC was acquired by Schneider Electric SA (Euronext: SU) headquartered in Rueil‐Malmaison, France. The jury found APC's AP7900 series and AP8900 series vertical, switched Power Distribution Units infringed both of the Server Technology patents.

On September 23, 2016, The US Federal Circuit Court of Appeals reversed the June 2014 Award and found that APC/Schneider Electric did not infringe upon the Server Technology patents.
