= Butterfield Green =

Hamlet in Luton, England

Coordinates: 51.9114°N 0.3970°W

Butterfield Green is a hamlet in the north of Luton, Bedfordshire, England. It is the location for the new 85-acre (340,000 m^{2}) Butterfield Business and Technology Park. When completed, the low density development will offer up to one million square feet of office space in a parkland setting.

One of the first buildings on the site is the Basepoint Business and Innovation Centre, which is starting to provide premises for many businesses. Butterfield is the location of the University of Bedfordshire's Healthcare Learning Centre. The UK's first Hilton Garden Inn hotel opened at Butterfield in July 2008 and MTL Instruments also arrived that year.
