= Crouse-Hinds Company =

American manufacturing company

- Founded: January 1897
- Founder: Huntington Beard Crouse (1872-1943) and Jesse Lorenzo Hinds (1846-1928)
- Fate: Still operating in name only as a subsidiary of Eaton Corporation, however, traffic products division was divested in 1981
- Headquarters: Syracuse, New York, United States
- Area served: United States
- Products: Industrial, explosionproof electrical equipment, instrumentation, commercial products

Crouse-Hinds Electric Company, a manufacturer of high grade electrical specialties, was established in 1897 in Syracuse, New York. They later shortened their name to Crouse-Hinds Company and beginning in the early 1920s specialized in the manufacture of traffic signals, controllers and accessories. The company name remained in use as a subsidiary of Cooper Industries; however, the traffic signal production ended in 1981 after Cooper sold the traffic products division. It is now a division under Eaton Corporation.

== Operating divisions ==
The company's 1980 annual report listed and described the divisions on pages 49–51. Other than Belden (see below) they were:

- Construction Materials Products - Electrical fittings, panelboards, switches, motor starters, control devices, instruments, enclosures, connectors and industrial lighting fixtures.
- Distribution Equipment Products - Load centers, circuit breakers, safety switches, meter sockets and group metering equipment.
- Lighting Products - Indoor/outdoor lighting equipment, aviation ground lighting, obstruction lighting and lighting poles.
- Traffic Control Products - Vehicle and pedestrian traffic signals and controls and vehicle detectors.
- Arrow Hart - Electrical wiring devices, specialty switches and industrial control equipment for commercial and industrial use.(Acquired 1975)

== Sheerness Manufacturing Facility ==
Crouse-Hinds operated a manufacturing facility in Sheerness, Kent, United Kingdom, which served as a key site for the production of electrical enclosures and equipment designed for use in hazardous environments. Initially established under the CEAG brand and later operating as part of Cooper Crouse-Hinds, the facility manufactured products such as explosion-proof enclosures, control stations, and junction boxes for industrial applications including oil and gas, chemical processing, and marine sectors. The site contributed to the local economy through employment and specialized manufacturing before its closure in 2025, following the integration of operations under Eaton Corporation after its acquisition of Cooper Industries.
