= Leviton =

American electrical equipment manufacturer

Leviton Manufacturing Company, Inc.
- Type: Private
- Industry: Electrical equipment
- Founded: 1906; 120 years ago
- Founder: Isidor Leviton
- Headquarters: Melville, New York, USA
- Area served: Worldwide
- Key people: Donald Hendler (Director of the Board, Former CEO); Daryoush Larizadeh (President & CEO); Stephen B. Sokolow (Chairman)
- Products: Electrical Devices, Lighting Controls, Network Solutions, Electric Vehicle Supply Equipment, Energy Measurement & Verification, Security & Automation
- Number of employees: 6,500 globally
- Website: www.leviton.com

Leviton Manufacturing Company, Inc. is an American manufacturer of electrical wiring equipment in North America. The company produces electrical outlets and Light switches, as well as GFCI and USB charging devices, network infrastructure, lighting control systems, load centers and circuit breakers, EV charging stations, and utility submetering.

== History ==
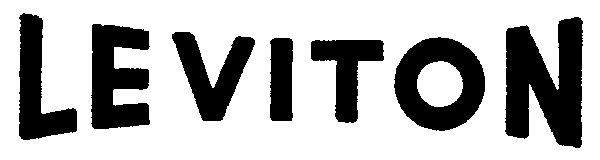
The original Leviton logo, used from 1924 to circa 1968

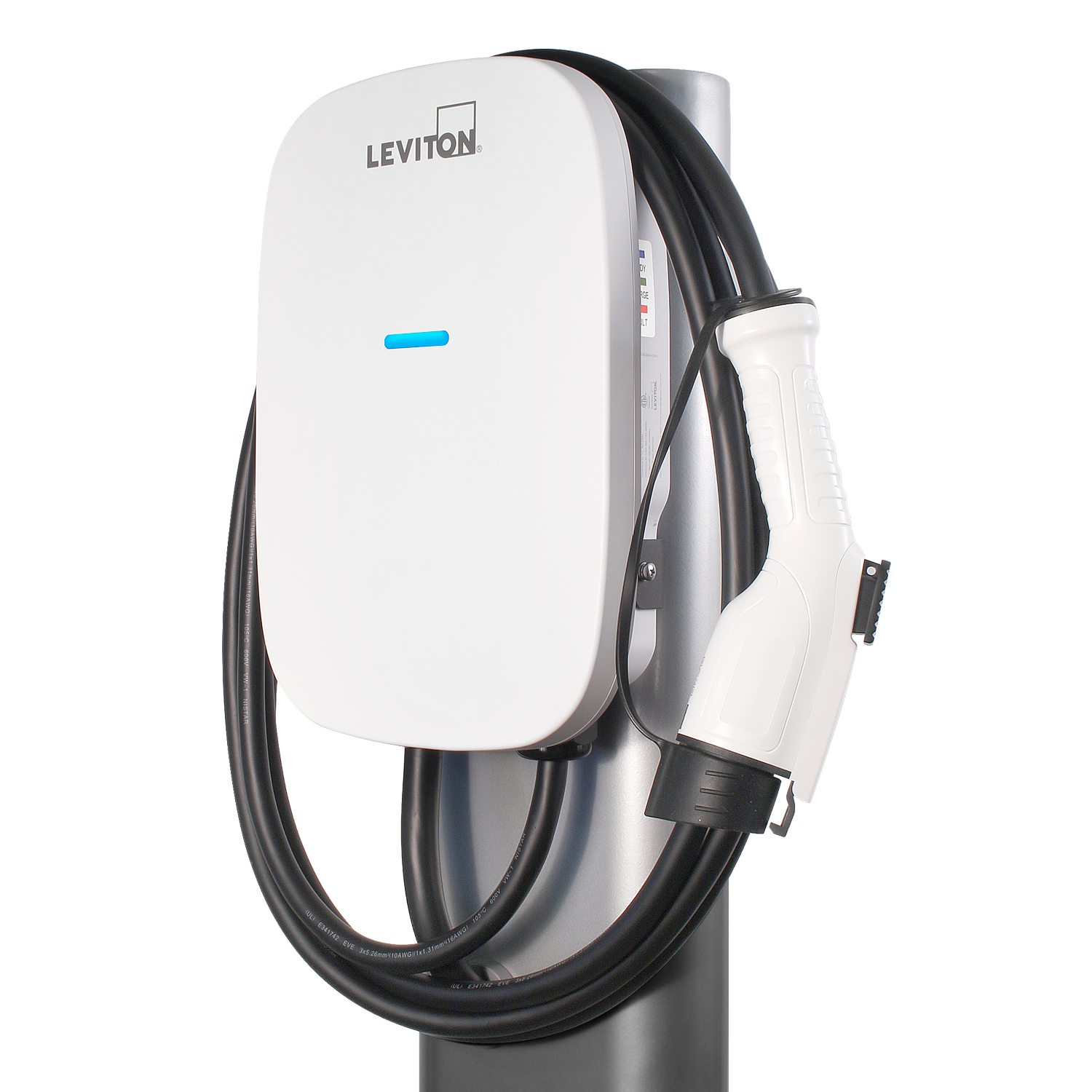
Leviton level 2 EV charging station

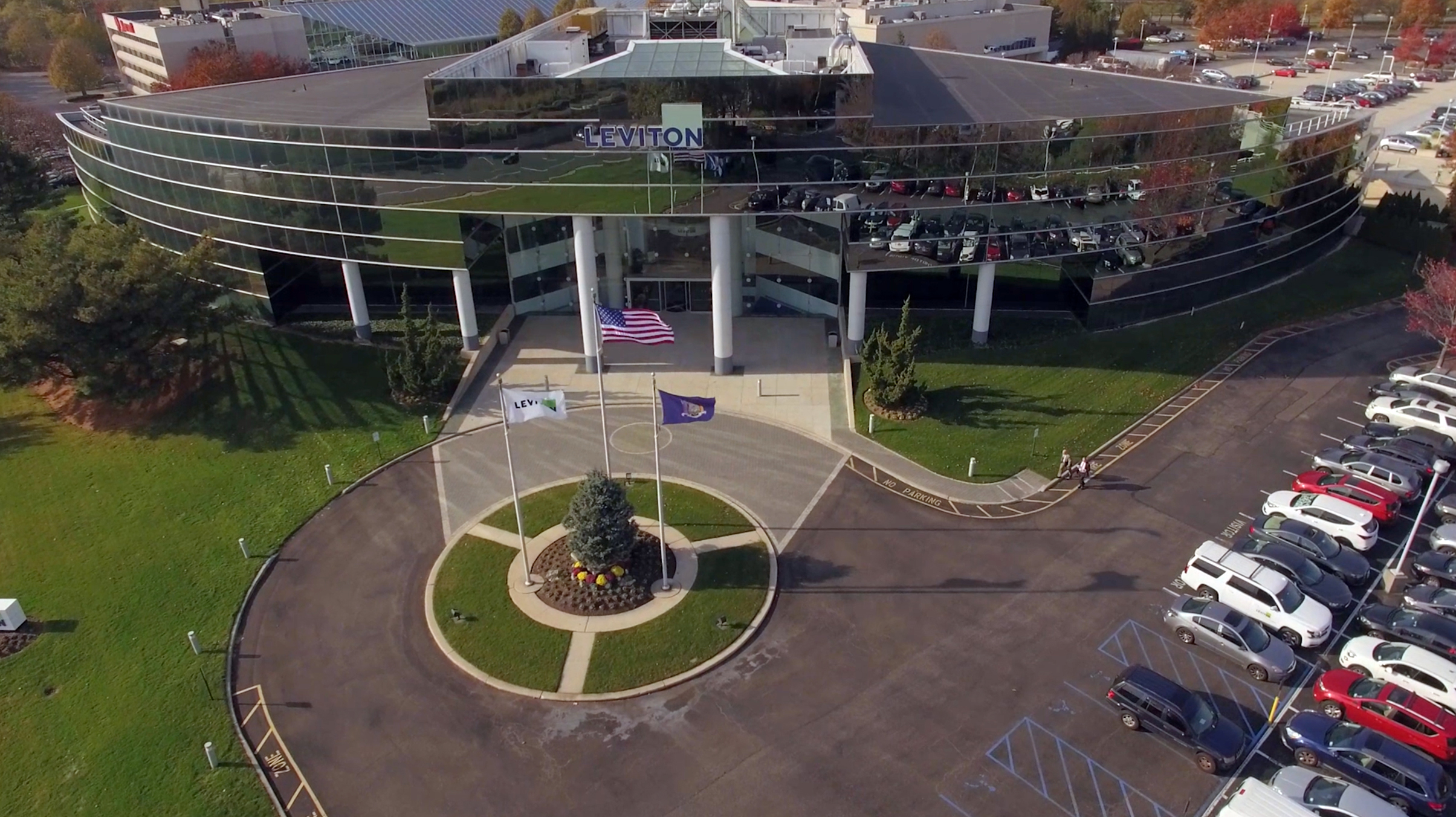
Leviton Headquarters

Leviton was founded in 1906 by Russian immigrants Evser Leviton (1864-1929) and his son Isidor Leviton (1886-1965) when they began manufacturing brass mantle tips for natural gas lights in Manhattan's Lower East Side. In 1910, Isidor designed a screw-in lampholder for the newly invented electric light bulb and within ten years the lampholders were installed in apartment buildings across Manhattan.

In 1916, Leviton moved its headquarters to Williamsburg, Brooklyn, and in 1922 Leviton moved to Greenpoint, Brooklyn.

The company first began manufacturing wall outlets and switches in the 1920s. In 1936, Leviton built a new manufacturing plant in Greenpoint that allowed the company to begin making pull chains. In 1937, Leviton acquired wire and cable manufacturer American Insulated Wire, which it operated until 2010, when Leviton sold American Insulated Wire to Southwire.

During World War II and the postwar economic boom Leviton manufactured materials for the Allies.

In 1963, Leviton opened manufacturing facilities in North Carolina under the name Southern Devices, as well as a manufacturing plant in Rhode Island. In 1965, Isidor's son Harold Leviton assumed the roles of CEO and president, and Isidor's son-in-law Jack Amsterdam became chairman.

After the eruption of the Azores Capelinhos volcano in 1957 displaced Portuguese citizens, Harold Leviton facilitated jobs for 150 of the affected individuals who immigrated to the United States in the 1960s.

In 1973, Leviton moved its headquarters to Little Neck, Queens.

In 2007, following the death of Harold Leviton, the company named Harold's sons-in-law Donald Hendler and Stephen Sokolow CEO and chairman of the board respectively.

Later in 2007, Leviton was sued by electronics company Lutron over alleged infringement of patents.

In 2009, the company moved its headquarters to Melville, Long Island.

In the 2010s, Leviton made several acquisitions. In 2012, the company acquired electrical device manufacturer Home Automation, Inc. In 2015, Leviton acquired cable manufacturer Brand-Rex. In 2016, Leviton acquired sustainable lighting manufacturer ConTech Lighting for an undisclosed amount. In 2017, Leviton acquired Southern California based company Birchwood Lighting.

By 2017, Leviton was considered the largest producer of electrical wiring devices in the United States, employing 6,500 people worldwide with an annual revenue of $1.5 billion.

In July 2020, Leviton acquired copper and fiber cable manufacturer Berk-Tek from Nexans for $202 million.

In February 2023, the company launched its Level 2 electric vehicle charging stations including 32, 48, and 50 Amp level 2 compatibility.

== Products ==
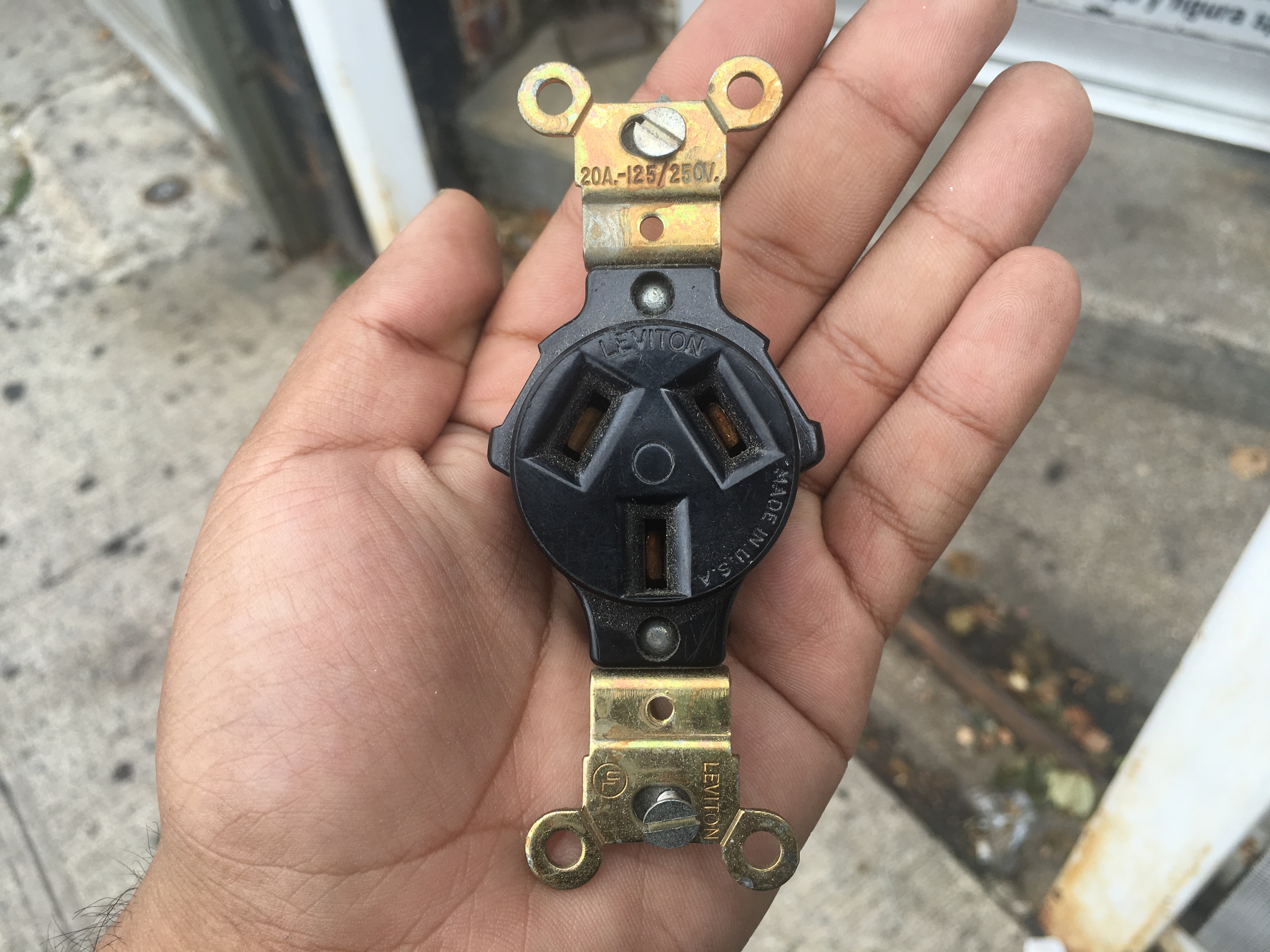
Leviton "Australian" style outlet

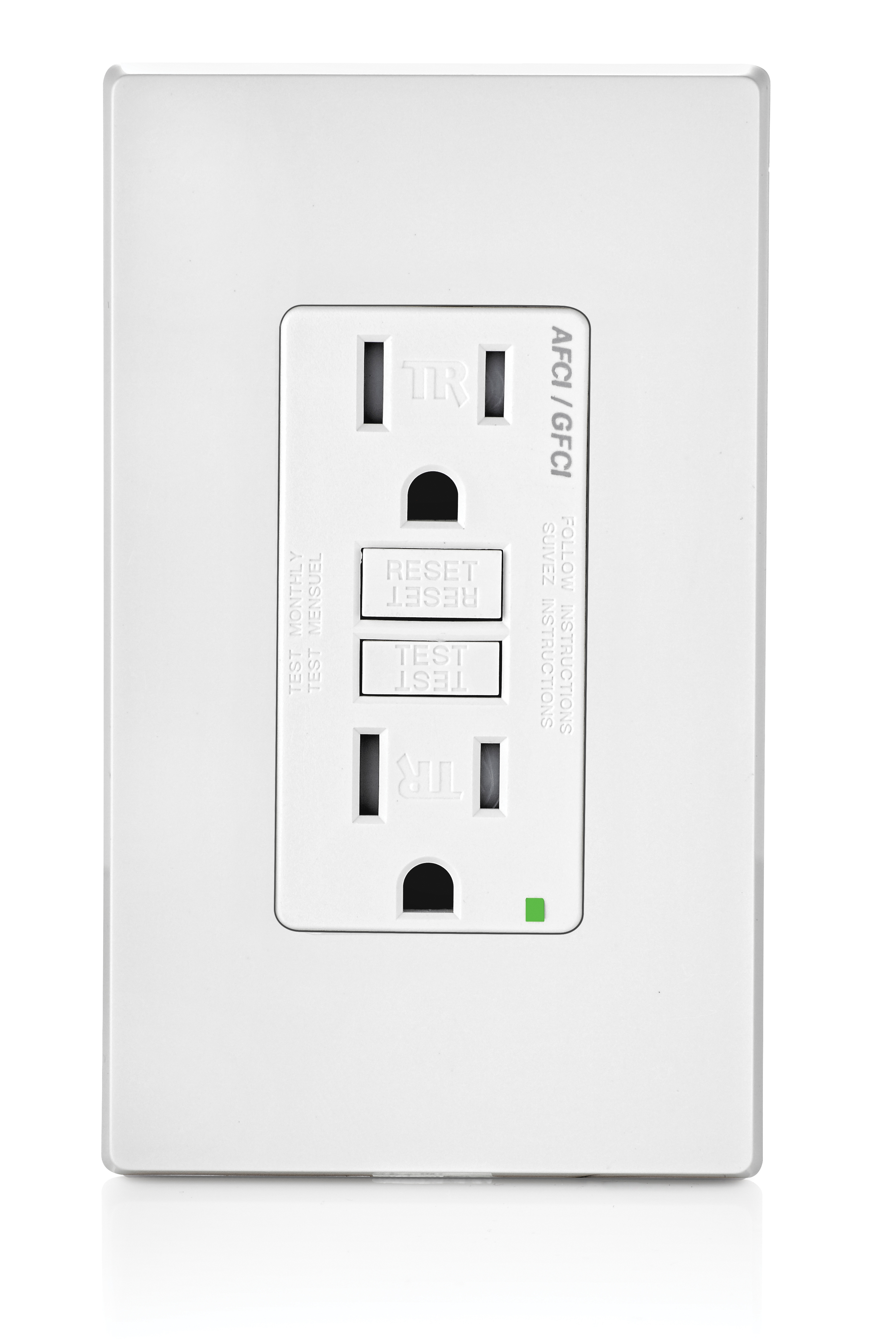
Leviton Dual Function AFCI GFCI Receptacle

== Key competitors ==
- Eaton Corporation (Cooper Wiring Devices)
- Hubbell Incorporated
- Legrand (Pass & Seymour)
- Lutron Electronics Company
