= Eagle Electric =

Eagle Electric Manufacturing Company, founded in 1920, was a maker of electrical devices, switches and circuit units based in Long Island City, New York, in the borough of Queens.

== History ==
The company was founded by Louis Ludwig and his younger brother Philip Ludwig both of whose children ran the company after the founders died.

The company's New York workers were represented by a union. Picketers were arrested outside the company's plant in January 1938.

For many years, Eagle had a giant neon billboard overlooking the Queensboro Bridge that became a familiar sight to motorists. It read, in capitals, "Eagle Electric-Perfection is not an accident". The slogan was written by founder Louis Ludwig. In 1987, under the direction of Mel Ludwig, the Advertising Manager, Oswald Fernandez began a process of updating the slogan the logo and packaging graphics. When the building was purchased the company had moved production to various parts of the world. As of 2006, Cooper Wiring Devices has moved all their manufacturing out of Long Island City, to Mexico, China, and the south-east United States.

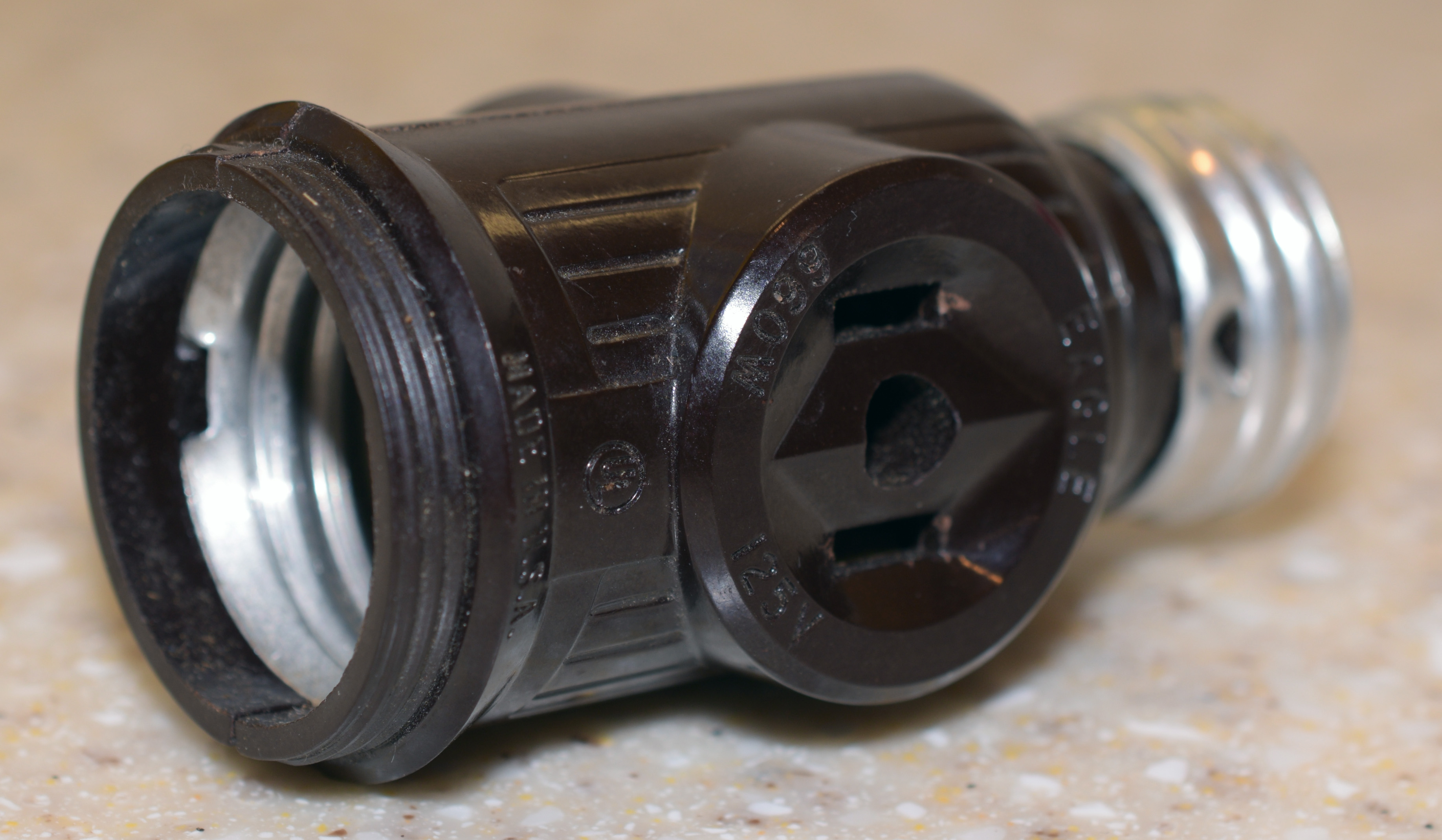
Screws into a light bulb socket to add two jacks, while still taking the bulb. Made in the US by Eagle Electric.

By the early 1980s Eagle Electric was selling thousands of wiring device SKUs to hardware stores across the country. In 1991 Eagle Electric, under the leadership of the Advertising Director, introduced a line of surge protector wiring devices under the brand eSmart, with the strong support of senior management. The eSmart brand was the first trademark with an "e" in front of it. The brand sold well to the big box stores as there was no competitive surge protector line in the industry. Eventually the brand was dismantled by then Marketing Director Jim Cook, because he felt that computers were a "passing fad."

The company began to move its production facilities away from New York to Greensboro, North Carolina in the early 1980s and later to Mexico. In 1997, the company announced that a new labor contract and tax abatements had convinced it to keep its operations in New York. But a year later, the company's president and some other executives were removed by its board of directors.

In the spring of 2000, Eagle was purchased by Cooper Industries to form Cooper Wiring Devices, Inc. Cooper Wiring Devices is now based in Peachtree City, Georgia. Eaton Corporation bought Cooper Industries in 2012, and Eagle Electric is now known as Eaton Wiring Devices.
