= Cooper Wiring Devices =

Division of Cooper Industries

Cooper Wiring Devices is a division of Cooper Industries and provides a range of residential, institutional and industrial grade electrical devices and wiring for consumers and building contractors. The company is the successor to both Arrow-Hart & Hegeman and Eagle Electric, both of which Cooper Industries had acquired. The Arrow-Hart brand is still used by Cooper Wiring Devices for some of their commercial products.

In 2005, Cooper Industries acquired the Torrance, CA-based company Novitas Inc. (occupancy sensors, switch packs and accessories) and merged it into Cooper Wiring Devices.

Cooper Wiring's key competitors today include Hubbell, Leviton, Legrand and Lutron Electronics Company.

Cooper Industries has been acquired by Eaton in 2012.
