= Power strip =

Electrical component

A North American power strip with two USB power ports that includes a built in surge protector

A power strip (also known as a multi-socket, power board and many other variations (Note: Also extension block, extension box, extension cord, power bar, plug board, pivot plug, trailing gang, trailing socket, plug bar, trailer lead, multiple socket, multiplug, multigang, multi-box, multibox, socket board, super plug, multiple outlet, polysocket.)) is a block of electrical sockets that attaches to the end of a flexible cable (typically with a mains plug on the other end), allowing multiple electrical devices to be powered from a single electrical socket. Power strips are often used when many electrical devices are in proximity, such as for audio, video, computer systems, appliances, power tools, and lighting. Power strips often include a circuit breaker to interrupt the electric current in case of an overload or a short circuit. Some power strips provide protection against electrical power surges. Typical housing styles include strip, rack-mount, under-monitor and direct plug-in.

== Control ==
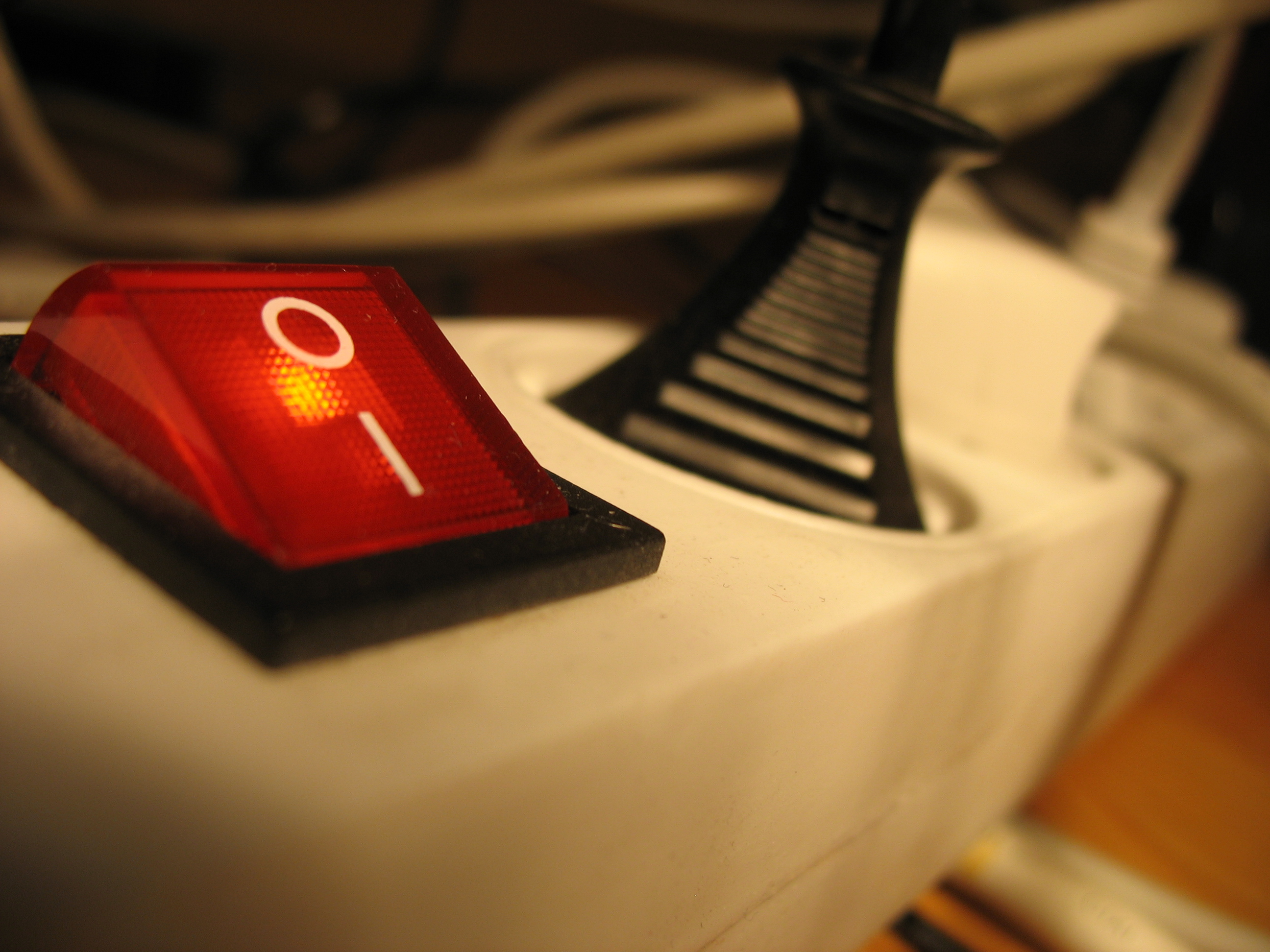
Illuminated power switch on a power strip

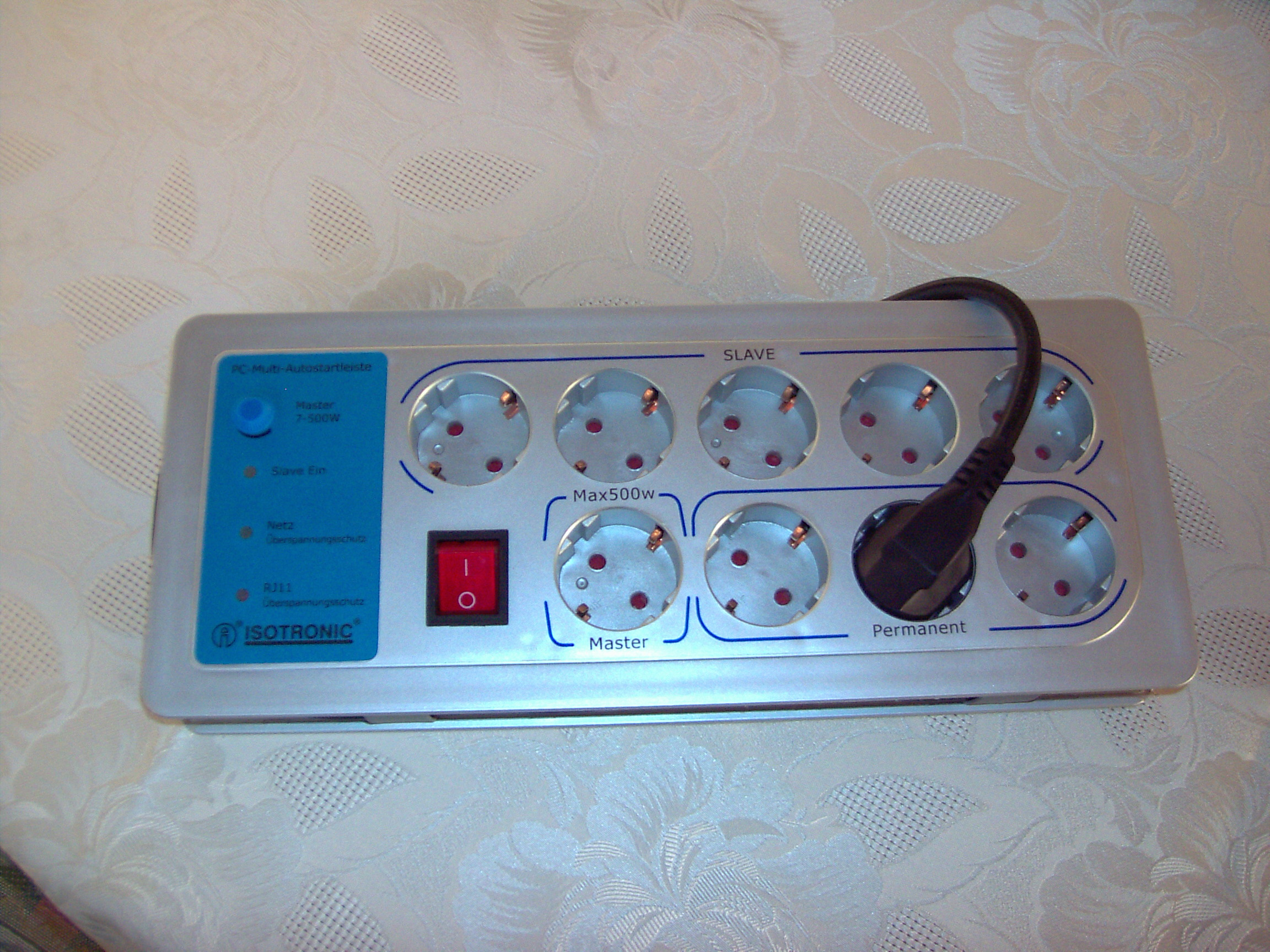
German master-slave remote controlled power strip

Some power strips include a master switch to turn all devices on and off. This can be used with simple devices, such as lights, but not with most computers, which must use shutdown commands from the software first. Computers may have open files, which may be damaged if the power is simply turned off.

Some power strips have individually switched outlets.

"Master/slave" strips can detect one "master" device being turned off (such as the PC itself in a computer setup, or a TV in a home theatre) and turn everything else on or off accordingly.

Remote control strips are used in data centers, to allow computer systems or other devices to be remotely restarted, often over the Internet (although this leaves them vulnerable to outside attacks).

== Indication ==
Many power strips have a neon or LED indicator light or one per output socket to show when power is on. Better-quality surge-protected strips have additional lights to indicate the status of the surge protection system, however these are not always reliable as an indicator.

== Energy-Saving Features and Standby Power ==
Some power strips have energy-saving features, which switch off the strip if appliances go into standby mode. Using a sensor circuit, they detect if the level of power through the socket is in standby mode (less than 30 watts), and if so they will turn off that socket. This reduces the consumption of standby power used by computer peripherals and other equipment when not in use, saving money and energy Some more-sophisticated power strips have a master and slave socket arrangement, and when the "master" socket detects standby mode in the attached appliance's current it turns off the whole strip.

However, there can be problems detecting standby power in appliances that use more power in standby mode (such as plasma televisions) as they will always appear to the power strip to be switched on. When using a master–slave power strip, one way to avoid such problems is to plug an appliance with a lower standby wattage (such as a DVD player) into the master socket, using it as the master control instead.

A different power strip design intended to save energy uses a passive infrared (PIR) or ultrasonic sound detector to determine if a person is nearby. If the sensors don't detect any motion for a preset period of time, the strip shuts off several outlets, while leaving one outlet on for devices that should not be powered off. These so-called "smart power strips" are intended to be installed in offices, to shut down equipment when the office is unoccupied.

It is recommended that appliances that need a controlled shutdown sequence (such as many ink-jet printers) not be plugged into a slave socket on such a strip as it can damage them if they are switched off incorrectly (for example the inkjet printer may not have capped the print head in time, and consequently the ink will dry and clog the print head.)

Within Europe, power strips with energy-saving features are within the scope of the Low Voltage Directive 2006/95/EC and the EMC Directive 2004/108/EC and require a CE mark.

== Socket Arrangement ==
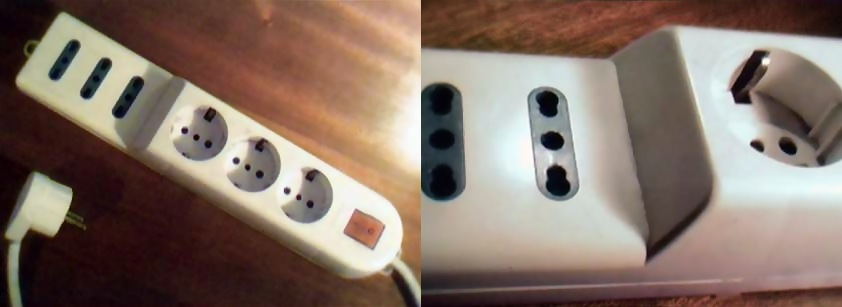
Italian power strip with two different types of socket

In some countries where multiple socket types are in use, a single power strip can have two or more kinds of sockets. Socket arrangement varies considerably, but for physical access reasons there are rarely more than two rows. In Europe, power strips without surge suppression are normally single row, but models with surge suppression are supplied both in single and double row configurations.

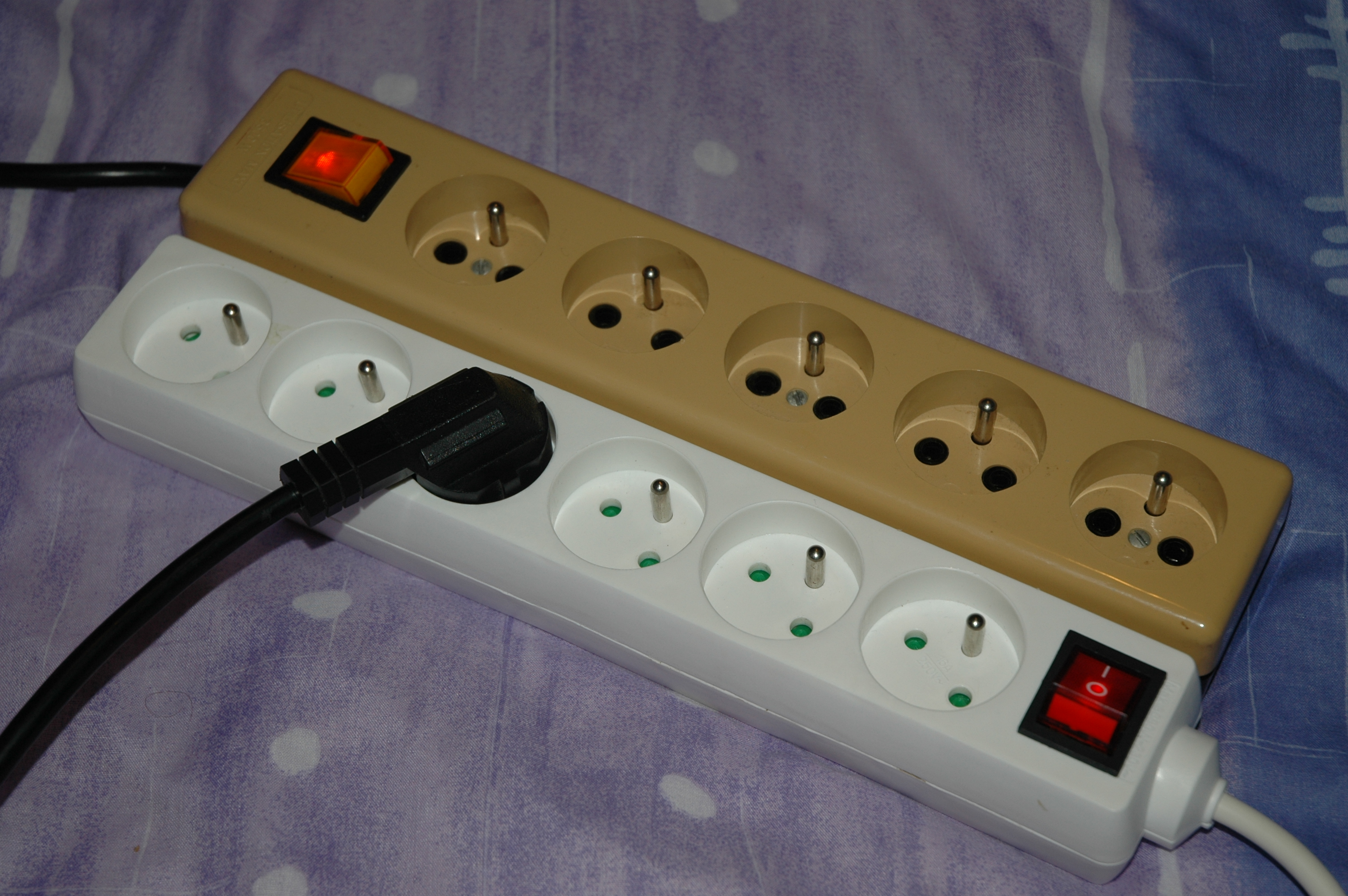
Two French (Type E socket) power strips. The connectors on one of them are slanted but not on the other; this makes either one of them more practical depending on setup.

If sockets on a power strip are grouped closely together, a cable with a large "wall wart" transformer at its end may cover up multiple sockets. Various designs address this problem, some by simply increasing the spacing between outlets. Other designs include receptacles which rotate in their housing, or multiple short receptacle cords feeding from a central hub. A simple DIY method for adapting problematic power strips arrangements to large "wall warts" is to use a three-way socket adapter to extend the socket above its neighbors, providing the required clearance.

== Surge Protection and Filtering ==
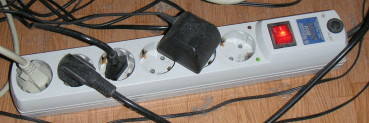
Schuko surge protected power strip (this model is unlikely to incorporate an inductor-capacitor network, due to lack of internal physical space)

Many power strips have built-in surge protectors or EMI/RFI filters: these are sometimes described as surge suppressors or electrical line conditioners. Some also provide surge suppression for phone lines, TV cable coax, or network cable. Unprotected power strips are often mistakenly called "surge suppressors" or "surge protectors" even though they may have no ability to suppress surges.

Surge suppression is usually provided by one or more metal-oxide varistors (MOVs), which are inexpensive two-terminal semiconductors. These act as very high speed switches, momentarily limiting the peak voltage across their terminals. By design, MOV surge limiters are selected to trigger at a voltage somewhat above the local mains supply voltage, so that they do not clip normal voltage peaks, but clip abnormal higher voltages.

Mains electrical power circuits are generally grounded (earthed), so there will be a live (hot) wire, a neutral wire, and a ground wire. Low-cost power strips often come with only one MOV mounted between the live and neutral wires. More complete (and desirable) power strips will have three MOVs, connected between each possible pair of wires. Since MOVs degrade somewhat each time they are triggered, power strips using them have a limited, and unpredictable, protective life. Some power strips have "protection status" lights which are designed to turn off if protective MOVs connected to the live wire have failed, but such simple circuits cannot detect all failure modes (such as failure of a MOV connected between neutral and ground).

The surge-induced triggering of MOVs can cause damage to an upstream device, such as an uninterruptible power supply (UPS), which typically sees an overload condition while the surge is being suppressed. Therefore, it is recommended not to connect a surge-protected power strip to a UPS, but instead to rely solely on surge protection provided by the UPS itself.

More-elaborate power strips may use inductor-capacitor networks to achieve a similar effect of protecting equipment from high voltage spikes on the mains circuit. These more-expensive arrangements are much less prone to silent degradation than MOVs, and often have monitoring lights that indicate whether the protective circuitry is still connected.

In the European Union, power strips with surge suppression circuits can demonstrate compliance with the (LVD) Low Voltage Directive 2006/95/EC by complying with the requirements of EN 61643-11:2002+A1. The standard covers both the performance of the surge suppression circuit and their safety. Likewise, power strips with telecoms surge suppression circuits can demonstrate compliance with the LVD by complying with the requirements of EN 61643-21:2001.

Newer models include indicator LEDs or app-based alerts that notify users when surge protection is no longer functioning. In regions like Europe and the UK, surge protectors must comply with EN 61643-11:2012+A1:2017, while UL 1363–2022 applies in North America.

=== Daisy chaining and surge protection ===
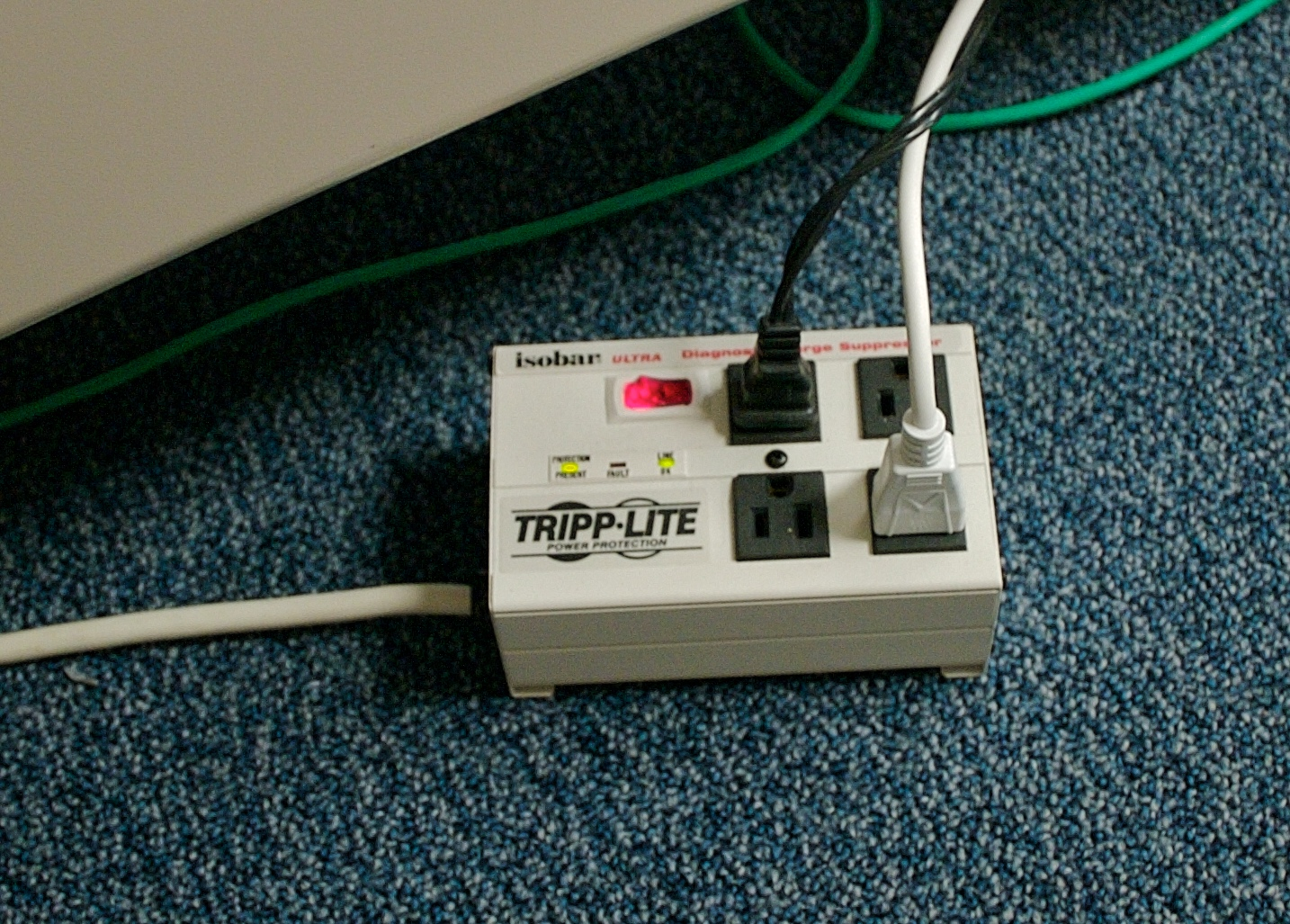
North American surge suppressor power strip with separate protection status indicator lights

Connecting MOV-protected power strips in a "daisy chain" (in a series, with each power strip plugged into a previous one in the chain) does not necessarily increase the protection they provide. Connecting them in this manner effectively connects their surge protection components in parallel, in theory spreading any potential surge across each surge protector. However, due to manufacturing variations between the MOVs, the surge energy will not be spread evenly, and will typically go through the one that triggers first.

Daisy chaining of power strips (known in building and electric codes as multi-plug adapters or relocatable power taps), whether surge protected or not, is specifically against most codes. As an example, the International Code Council's International Fire Code 2009 Edition in 605.4.2 states, "Relocatable power taps shall be directly connected to permanently installed receptacles."

== Overload Protection ==
Where the current rating of the socket outlet, plug and lead of the power strip is equal to the rating of the circuit breaker supplying the circuit concerned, additional overload protection for the power strip is unnecessary, since the existing circuit breaker will provide the required protection. However, where the rating of a socket outlet (and, hence, the plug and lead of the power strip) is less than the rating of the circuit breaker supplying the circuit concerned, overload protection for the power strip and its supply cable is necessary.

In the UK, standard BS 1363 plugs and sockets are rated at 13 A but are provided on circuits protected by circuit breakers of up to 32 A. However, UK Consumer Protection legislation requires that plug-in domestic electrical goods must be provided with plugs to BS 1363, which include a fuse rated at not more than 13 A. Hence, in the UK and in other countries using BS 1363 plugs, this fused plug provides overload protection for any power strip. The fuse must be replaced if the power strip is overloaded, causing the fuse to operate.

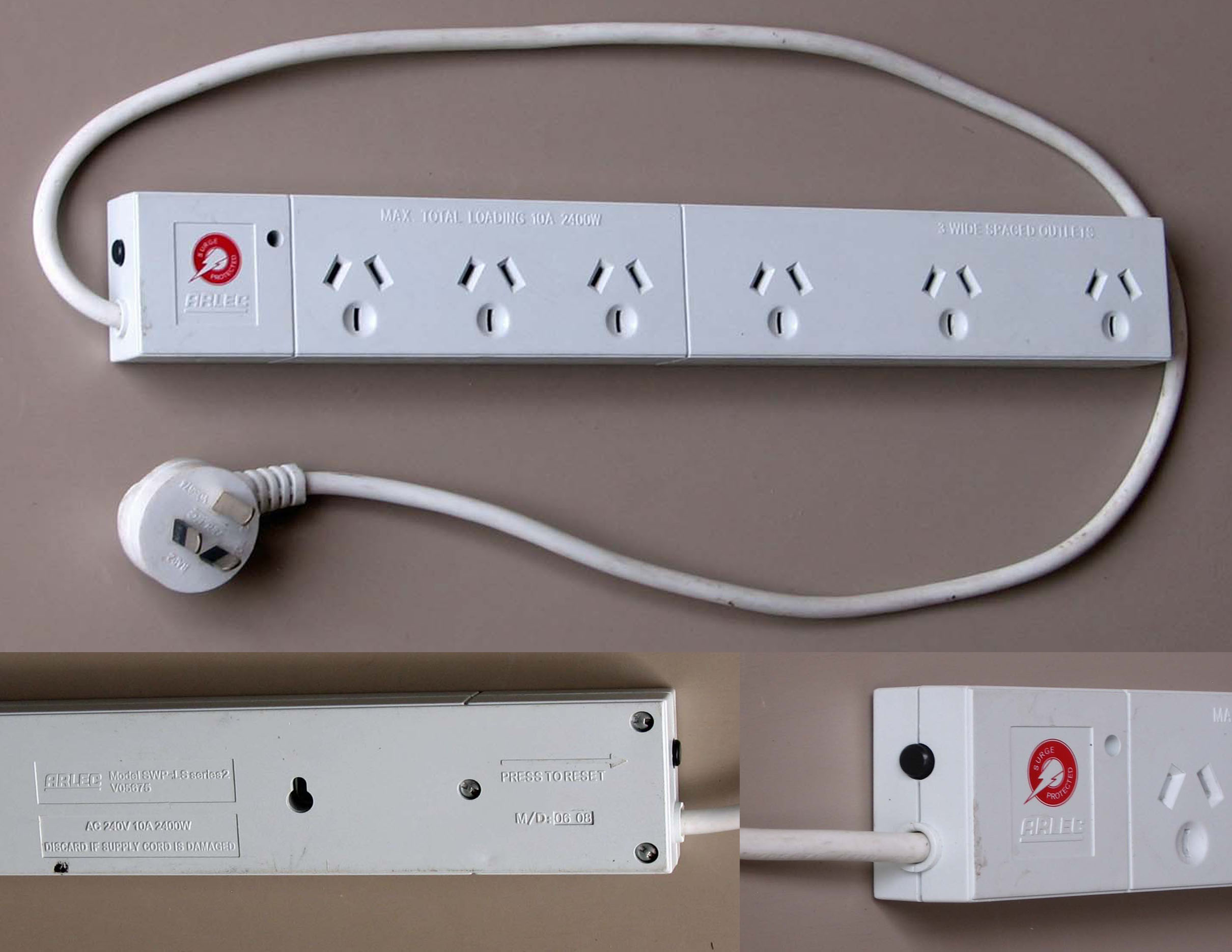
Australian/NZ 10 A, 6 Outlet Power Board, with resettable overload protection

In Australia and New Zealand the rating for a standard socket outlet is 10 Amperes but these outlets are provided on circuits usually protected by circuit breakers of 16 or 20 A capacity. Also, it is possible to insert an Australian/NZ 10 A plug into socket outlets rated at up to 32 A. Hence, all power strips sold in Australia and New Zealand with three or more 10A socket outlets are required to have overload protection so that if the total current drawn exceeds 10 A the inbuilt circuit breaker will operate and disconnect all connected devices. These power strips have a reset button for the circuit breaker, which is used to return the strip to service after an overload has caused it to trip.

On some power strips, the red, lighted rocker switch actually controls a thermal circuit breaker which flips to off when tripped. Resetting is done by flipping the switch back on.

== Safety ==
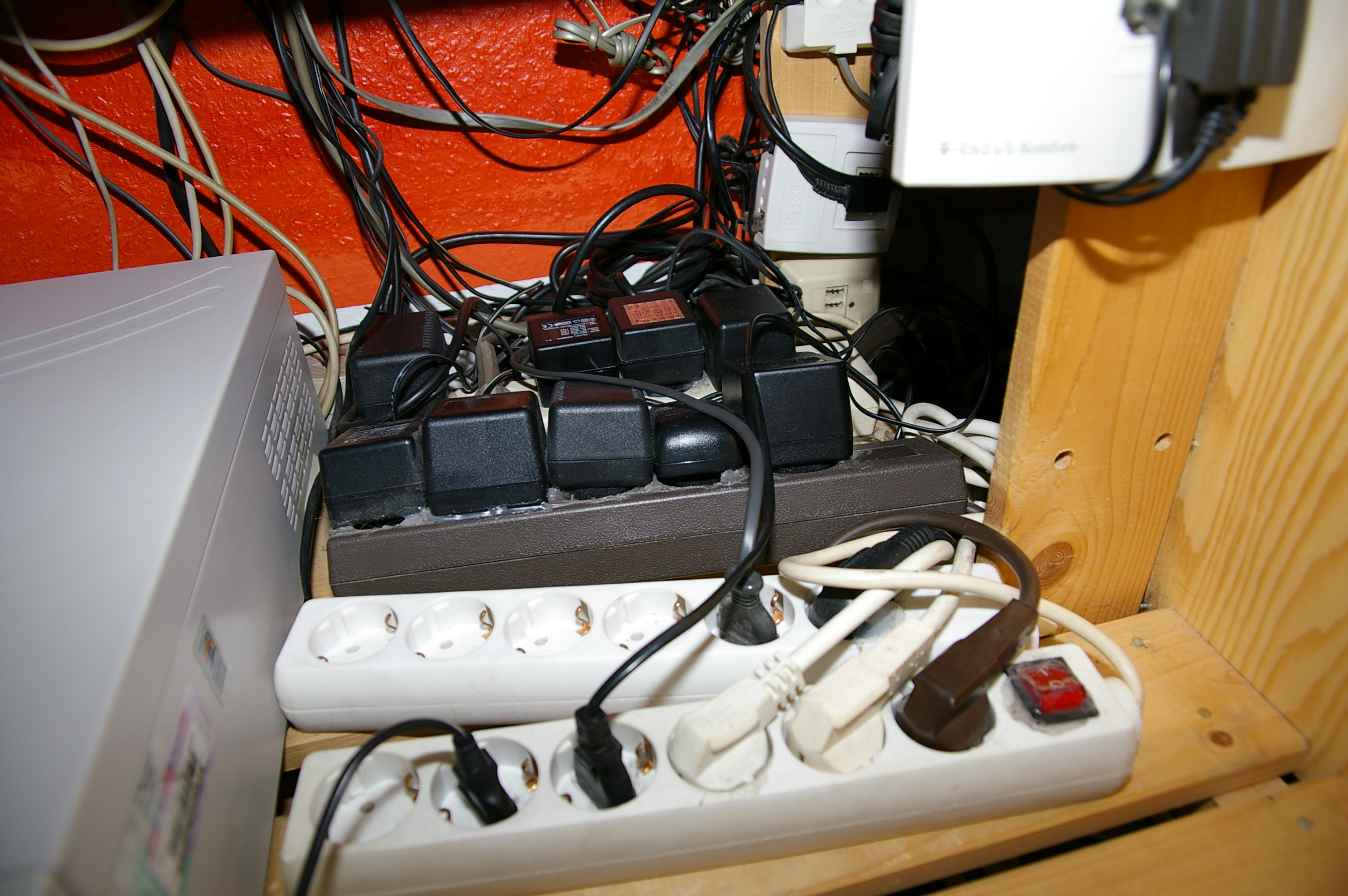
Multiple power strips and AC adapters

Electrical overloading can be a problem with any sort of power distribution adapter. This is especially likely if multiple high-power appliances are used, such as those with heating elements, like room heaters or electric frying pans. Power strips may have a circuit breaker integrated to prevent overload. In the UK, power strips are required to be protected by the fuse in the BS 1363 plug. Some also feature a 13A BS1362 fuse in the socket end.

Power strips are generally considered a safer alternative to “double adapters”, “two-way plugs”, “three-way plugs”, or “cube taps” which plug directly into the socket with no lead for multiple appliances. These low-cost adapters are generally not fused (although more modern ones in the UK and Ireland are). Therefore, in many cases the only protection against overload is the branch circuit fuse which may well have a rating higher than the adapter. The weight of the plugs pulling on the adapter (and often pulling it part way out of the socket) can also be a problem if adapters are stacked or if they are used with brick-style power supplies. Such adapters, while still available, have largely fallen out of use in some countries (although two- and three-way adapters are still common in the US, UK, and Ireland).

When plugging a device into a power strip, a buildup of carbon or dust can cause sparking to occur. This generally doesn't pose much of a risk in a non-explosive atmosphere, but explosive atmospheres (for example, near a gasoline refueling station or a solvent cleaning facility) require specialized explosion-proof sealed electrical equipment.

In the UK, power strips must now feature UKCA certification alongside or instead of CE markings post-Brexit. Compliance with RoHS and REACH ensures that hazardous substances like lead, mercury, and cadmium are restricted in materials used for manufacturing. Advanced models incorporate thermal fuses and circuit-breakers with auto-reset or audible alarms to alert users of overload conditions.

=== US regulations ===
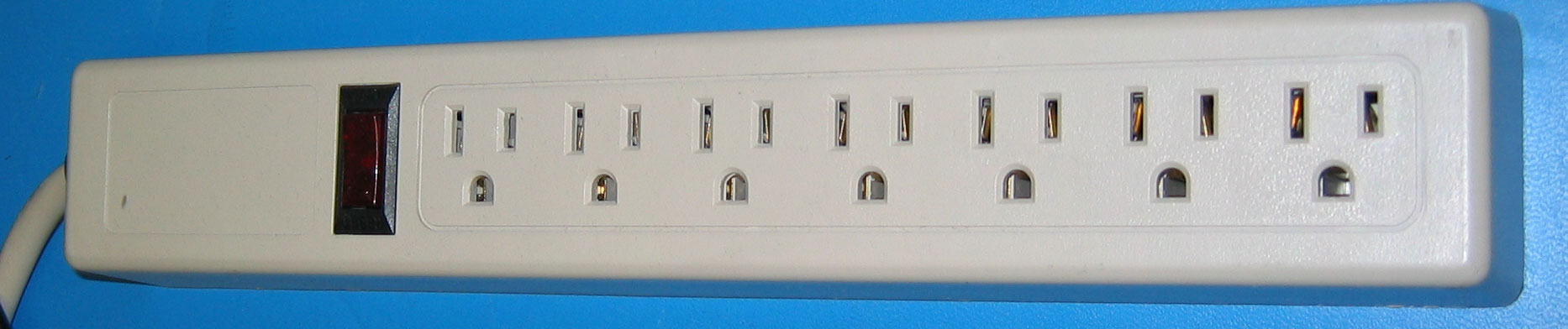
US power strip with switch

- Underwriters Laboratories standard 1363 contains requirements for relocatable power taps. Included in the scope section of the standard is the statement:
  1.1 These requirements cover cord-connected, relocatable power taps rated 250 V AC or less and 20 A AC or less. A relocatable power tap is intended only for indoor use as a temporary extension of a grounding alternating-current branch circuit for general use.
- National Electrical Code recognizes power strip as Multioutlet Assembly in Article 380.

=== EU and UK regulations ===
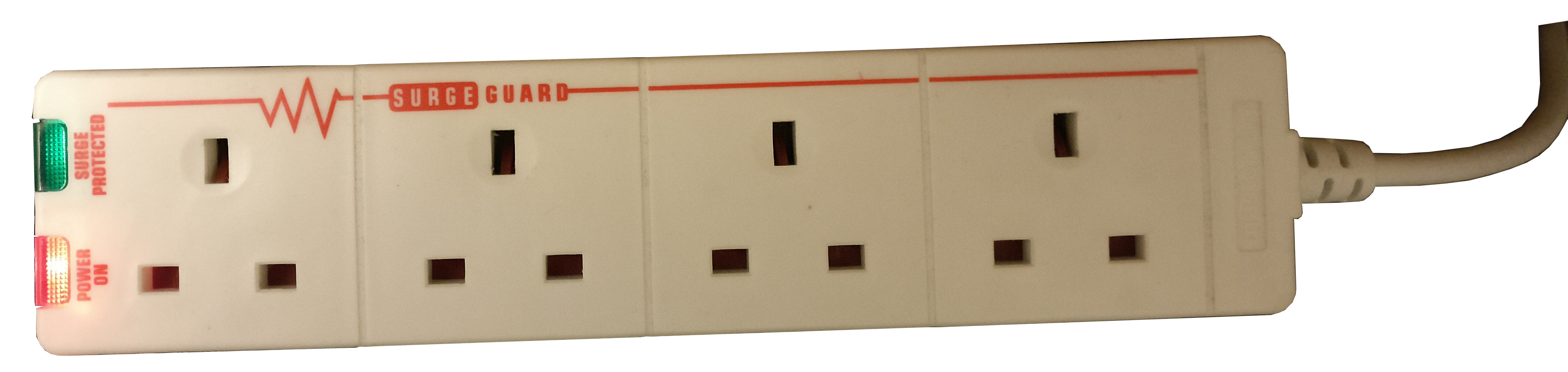
British power strip with neon indicator

In Europe, plugs and sockets without additional control or surge protection circuits are outside the scope of the Low Voltage Directive 2006/95/EC and controlled by National regulations, and therefore must not be CE marked. In the UK the legal requirements for plugs and sockets are listed in Statutory Instrument 1994 No. 1768, The Plugs and Sockets etc. (Safety) Regulations 1994. This regulation lists the requirements for all domestic plugs and sockets; including socket outlet units (power strips), see Electrical Equipment - Requirements for Plugs & Sockets etc. - Guidance notes on the UK Plugs & Sockets etc. (Safety) Regulations 1994 (S.I. 1994/1768).

The regulation requires all socket outlet units to comply with the requirements of BS 1363-2 Specification for 13A switched and unswitched socket-outlets and with the requirements of BS 5733 Specification for General requirements for electrical accessories. Sockets and socket outlets do not require independent approval under the regulations. Any plug fitted to the socket outlet unit must comply with the requirements of BS 1363-1 Specification for rewirable and non-rewirable 13A fused plugs. Plugs must also be independently approved and marked in accordance with the requirements of the regulation.

If a socket outlet unit contains additional control circuits or surge protection circuits they will fall within the scope of the Low Voltage Directive 2006/95/EC and must be CE marked. Socket outlet units with control circuits also fall within the scope of the EMC Directive 2004/108/EC.

== History ==
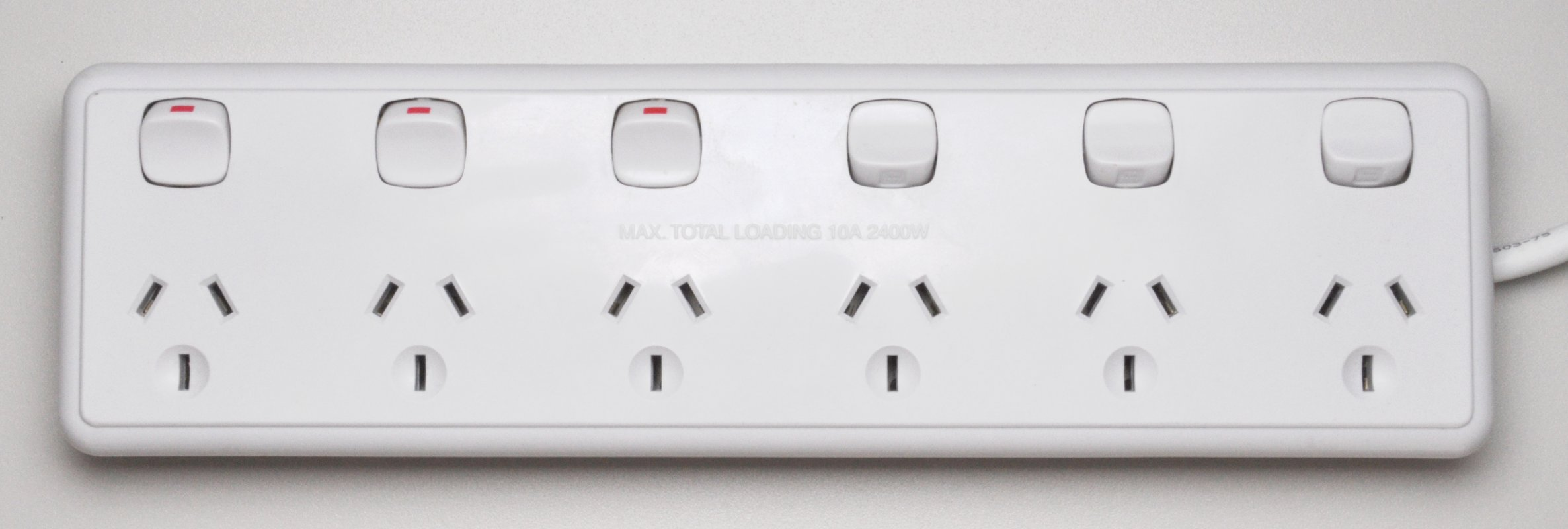
Australian / New Zealand power board with individual switches

Outlet multipliers with the same purpose as power strips go back at least to the early 1920s. However, these were usually not in a long "strip" like in modern devices. Examples of power strips exist in the U.S. patent system dating back as far as 1929, starting with the creation of Carl M. Petersen's "Table Tap". Another early example was created by Allied Electric Products in 1950.

Perhaps the first modern designs for the power strip were created by the U.S. firm Fedtro, which filed two patents in 1970 for designs that were close to designs used in the modern day.

One early iteration, called a "power board", was invented in 1972 by Australian electrical engineer Peter Talbot working under Frank Bannigan, managing director of Australian company Kambrook. The product was hugely successful, however, it was not patented and market share was eventually lost to other manufacturers.

== See also ==
- AC power plugs and sockets
- Extension cord
- Power cord
- Power distribution unit (PDU)
- Remote power boot switch
- Standby power
- Rectifier
