= Netatmo =

French company that manufactures home automation devices

- Type: S.A.
- Industry: Home automation
- Founded: 2011 in Boulogne-Billancourt, France
- Founders: Fred Potter; Jean-Pierre Dumolard
- Headquarters: 93 rue Nationale, Boulogne-Billancourt, France
- Products: Smart home weather station smart indoor air quality monitor smart thermostat smart indoor camera smart outdoor camera netatmo radiator valves
- Website: https://netatmo.com/

Netatmo is a French company which manufactures home automation devices. Founded in 2011, it has launched a variety of products including various security cameras, personal weather stations, and an internet-connected smoke detector.

The company was bought in November 2018 by the French group Legrand.

== History ==
The company Netatmo was created in 2011 by Fred Potter, an engineer and entrepreneur, and Jean-Pierre Dumolard.

In 2012, Netatmo launched its first product: the Smart Home Weather Station. In the same year, the company raised 4.5 million Euros in funds to speed up its distribution and widen its platform and product range.

In November 2015, the company raised 30 million Euros in funds and sold a stake to the Legrand group.

In 2016, French president François Hollande visited Netatmo's offices.

In 2018, during the Consumer Electronics Show, Netatmo announced a partnership with the Muller group and introduced its Smart Home Bot to control its Netatmo products. The company increased its number of partnerships with large groups like Legrand and VELUX, and, alongside them, it co-developed smart technologies incorporated into construction infrastructure. The VELUX ACTIVE range; designed to intelligently control indoor climates by automating the operation of windows and window coverings based on parameters such as temperature, humidity, and air quality; was also released on the market in July.

Netatmo was acquired by the Legrand group in November 2018 and merged with Legrand's home automation branch. The Netatmo brand name was kept.

In 2019, Netatmo announced a new partnership with the company Bubendorff, with which it released its iDiamant, a home automation device for Bubendorff roller shutters.

== Products ==
Smart Home Weather Station: launched in 2012, this was the brand's first product. It measures ultra-local weather data and is made up of two modules: an indoor module and an outdoor module.

Additional Smart Indoor Module: launched in 2013, this is an accessory for the Smart Home Weather Station.

Smart Thermostat: launched in 2013, this was designed by Philippe Starck. It helps users save energy while maintaining the right temperature in their home.

Smart Rain Gauge: launched in 2014, this is an accessory for the Smart Home Weather Station that measures rainfall.

Smart Indoor Camera: launched in 2015, it is equipped with facial-recognition technology. In real time, it alerts its user in the event of an intruder entering their home.

Smart Outdoor Camera: launched in 2016, this camera distinguishes between people, animals and cars. In real time, it alerts its user in the event of an intruder setting foot on their property.

Smart Anemometer: launched in 2016, this measures wind direction and speed.

Smart Radiator Valves: launched in 2017, they were designed by Philippe Starck. They are used to control the temperature of a home, room by room. They are available as a package for central heating or as a complement to the Smart Thermostat.

Smart Indoor Air Quality Monitor: launched in 2017, this analyses a home's temperature, humidity, noise and CO_{2} level, and provides advice for creating a healthier environment.

Smart Smoke Alarm: launched in 2018, this sends an alert to a smartphone in real time in the event of fire detection.

Smart Video Doorbell: launched in 2020, 2 Way Audio, HD 1080P, Person Detection, Night Vision, Easy Installation, No Subscription Fees, NDBUS. Now discontinued due the low sales and hardware limitations.

== WeatherMap ==
The home weather stations of users who share their outdoor data are displayed on the WeatherMap, an open-access map that displays temperatures, wind information and levels of rainfall.

In 2018, Norway's public weather service YR began to use WeatherMap to improve its forecasts for people in Norway, Sweden, Finland and Denmark.

== Co-developed products ==
Through its ‘with Netatmo' program, the company partners with construction companies to develop products incorporated into the infrastructure of individual homes, in areas such as new builds or renovation.

In January 2018, Netatmo worked with French company Legrand to co-create and launch various internet-connected switches and sockets through which lighting, roller shutters and electric devices can be remotely controlled from a smartphone or vocally.

In July 2018, Netatmo launched products which allows Velux roof windows, blinds and roller shutters to be operated remotely and automatically.

With the Muller group, Netatmo co-created an electric-radiator connection module designed to regulate heating systems for home automation room by room.

== Awards ==
Produit	Année	Prix
Smart Home Weather Station	2012	A'design Award – Home Appliances Design Category
Smart Home Weather Station	2013	A'design Award – Home Appliances Design Category
Smart Home Weather Station	2013	3 CES Awards – Home Appliances, Tech for a Better World, Health & Fitness
Smart Thermostat	2014	1 CES Award – Honoree
Smart Thermostat	2015	A'Design Award – Gold
Smart Thermostat	2015	Objet connecté de l'année 2015
Smart Indoor Camera	2015	4 CES Awards – Smart Home, Home Appliances, Digital Imaging, Tech for a better World
Smart Outdoor Camera	2016	4 CES Awards – Smart Home, Home Appliances, Digital Imaging, Tech for a better World
Smart Outdoor Camera	2017	5 Plus X Awards – Innovation, High quality, Design, Ease of use, Functionality
Smart Indoor Air Quality Monitor	2017	Label "Choisi par Parents"
Smart Indoor Air Quality Monitor	2017	Quiet Mark Award International
Smart Radiator Valves	2016	Top Tech of IFA, Home Category – Digital Trends
Smart Radiator Valves	2017	4 CES Awards – Tech for a better world, Smart Home, Home Appliances and Eco-design, Sustainable technologies
Céliane with Netatmo	2017	2 CES Awards – Smart Home et Home appliances
VELUX ACTIVE with Netatmo	2017	2 CES Awards – Smart Home et Eco-design & Sustainable Technologies
Muller Intuitiv with Netatmo	2018	2 CES Awards – Smart Home et Eco-design
