= Benoît Coquart =

French businessman and CEO

- Born: November 30, 1973 (age 52)
- Education: Institute of Political Studies of Paris; ESSEC Business School
- Occupation: CEO of Legrand

Benoît Coquart is a French businessman who has been the CEO of Legrand since 2018.

== History ==
=== Early life ===
In 1994, Coquart graduated from the Paris Institute of Political Studies. Later, in 1995, he graduated from ESSEC Business School. In 1997, when Coquart was 22, he joined Legrand and managed the group's activities in South Korea.

=== Legrand ===
Coquart has been director of corporate development and director of strategy and development. Prior to that, he joined the company's management committee in 2010.

In 2015, he became the director of Legrand's activities in France.

In February 2018, Coquart became the chief executive officer of Legrand Group.

In 2019, he was appointed as the president of the jury of the Next Leaders Awards in Paris.

In the first quarter of 2021, while raw material prices increased and the risk of shortages emerged, Coquart assured that there would be no production interruptions in any factory worldwide.

In 2021, he announced the creation of a solidarity fund that would be devoted to the staff of hospitals for geriatrics.

== Other held positions ==
In July 2022, he was re-elected as the president of the Alliance of electrical and digital solutions of buildings (IGNES), which brings together 60 companies in France's building sector, representing more than 2 billion euros in sales. The term of office is three years.

Since 2017, he has been the vice president of the FIEEC (Federation of electrical industries, electronics and communication).

== Awards ==
In 2015, he was nominated in the "Smart Boss" category at the second Digital Industries Awards ceremony.

In 2019, Coquart was among the nominees in the category of "Allied Leaders" at the event of the second edition of the Ceremony of LGBT+ Role Models, organized by l'Autre Cercle association.
