= Master of Teaching and Learning =

UK postgraduate degree

The Master of Teaching and Learning degree or MTL is a postgraduate degree for teachers and others working in or studying education in the United Kingdom first developed in September 2009 by approved providers in conjunction with the TDA.

It is often referred to as the Master of Teaching degree or MTeach in Australia. It has replaced the Bachelor of Teaching, Diploma of Teaching and the Diploma of Education as the Australian "end-on" education degree. For example, specialist teachers may choose to specialise in their area, through degrees such as the Bachelor of Arts or Bachelor of Science, and then complete their master's degree in Teaching to complete their university education. The Australian Master of Teaching and Learning degree or MEdLea is an education administrative leadership course provided by only some universities in Australia.
