= Ensto =

Finnish electrical engineering company

Ensto Group
- Type: Osakeyhtiö
- Founded: 1958; 68 years ago
- Founder: Ensio Miettinen
- Headquarters: Porvoo, Finland
- Key people: Markku Moilanen (CEO)
- Products: Electrical products
- Revenue: 200 million euros (2025)
- Owner: Miettinen family
- Number of employees: 870 (2026)
- Website: www.ensto.com

Ensto is an international technology company and a family business, which designs and provides electrical products for electricity distribution networks. Ensto manufactures overhead line and underground cable products, distribution and protection automation and control products as well as substations.

Ensto was established by Ensio Miettinen in 1958. Since 2001, it has been owned by four of his descendants through the parent company EM Group. In 2018, the majority of the ownership was transferred to the third generation of the Miettinen family through the parent company Ensto Invest Oy. The headquarters of Ensto is in Porvoo, Finland, where the company was founded.

Ensto sold its Building Systems business to Legrand in 2021.
