= Eaton MTL =

Division of Eaton Corporation

Eaton MTL is a division of Eaton Corporation which produces electronic instrumentation and protection equipment for telecommunication and process control systems, including power systems, safety interfaces and surge protection. It has manufacturing facilities in Luton, UK; Chennai, India; Melbourne, Florida, USA and Brisbane, Australia.

== History ==
MTL Instruments was founded as a private company in 1971. In 2005 the company acquired GeCma Components GmbH, which manufactures computer terminals for use in hazardous areas. In 2007 MTL acquired three companies: ELPRO Technologies, which specialises in industrial wireless equipment and radio telemetry; RTK Instruments, which manufactures alarm equipment for process control systems; and Ocean Technical Systems, which provides remote instrumentation for offshore drilling vessels, tankers and pipelines. In 2008, MTL Instruments was purchased by Cooper Industries of Houston, Texas, under that company's Crouse-Hinds division.
