= Power distribution unit =

Data center power strip

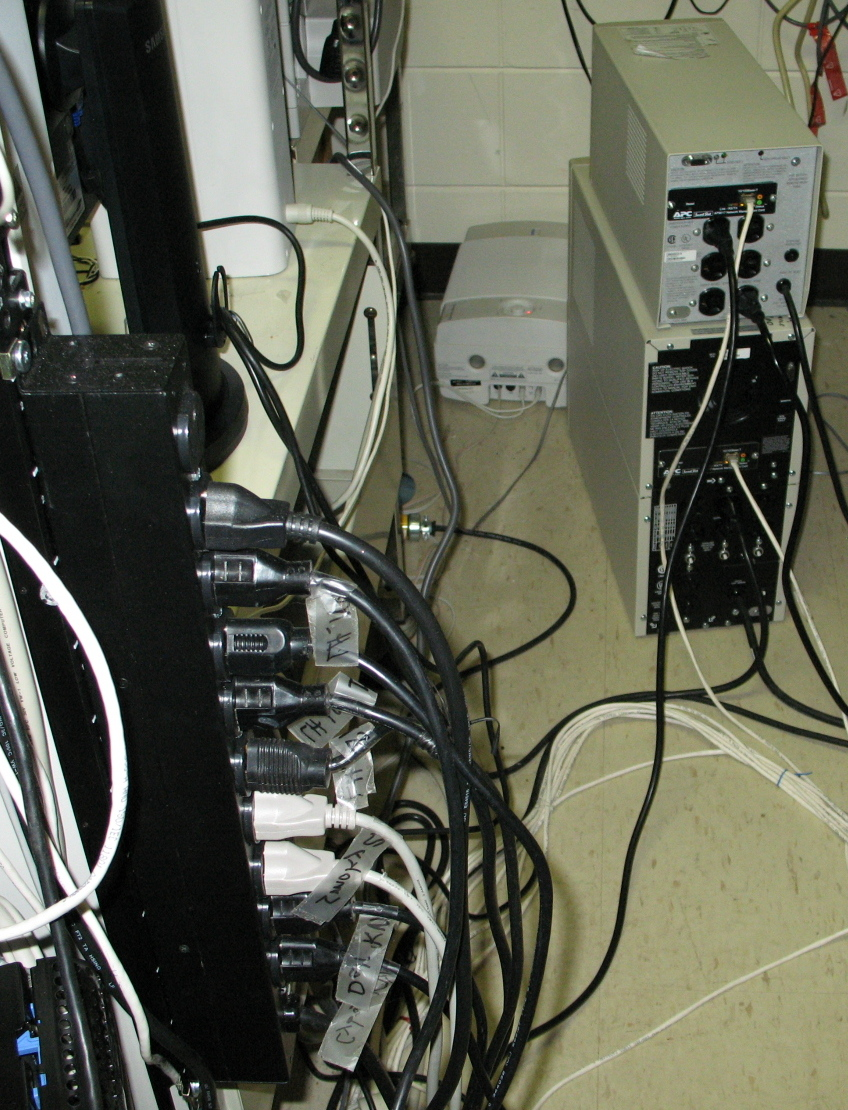
A 10-outlet rack-mount PDU (front), connected to a UPS (bottom unit on right)

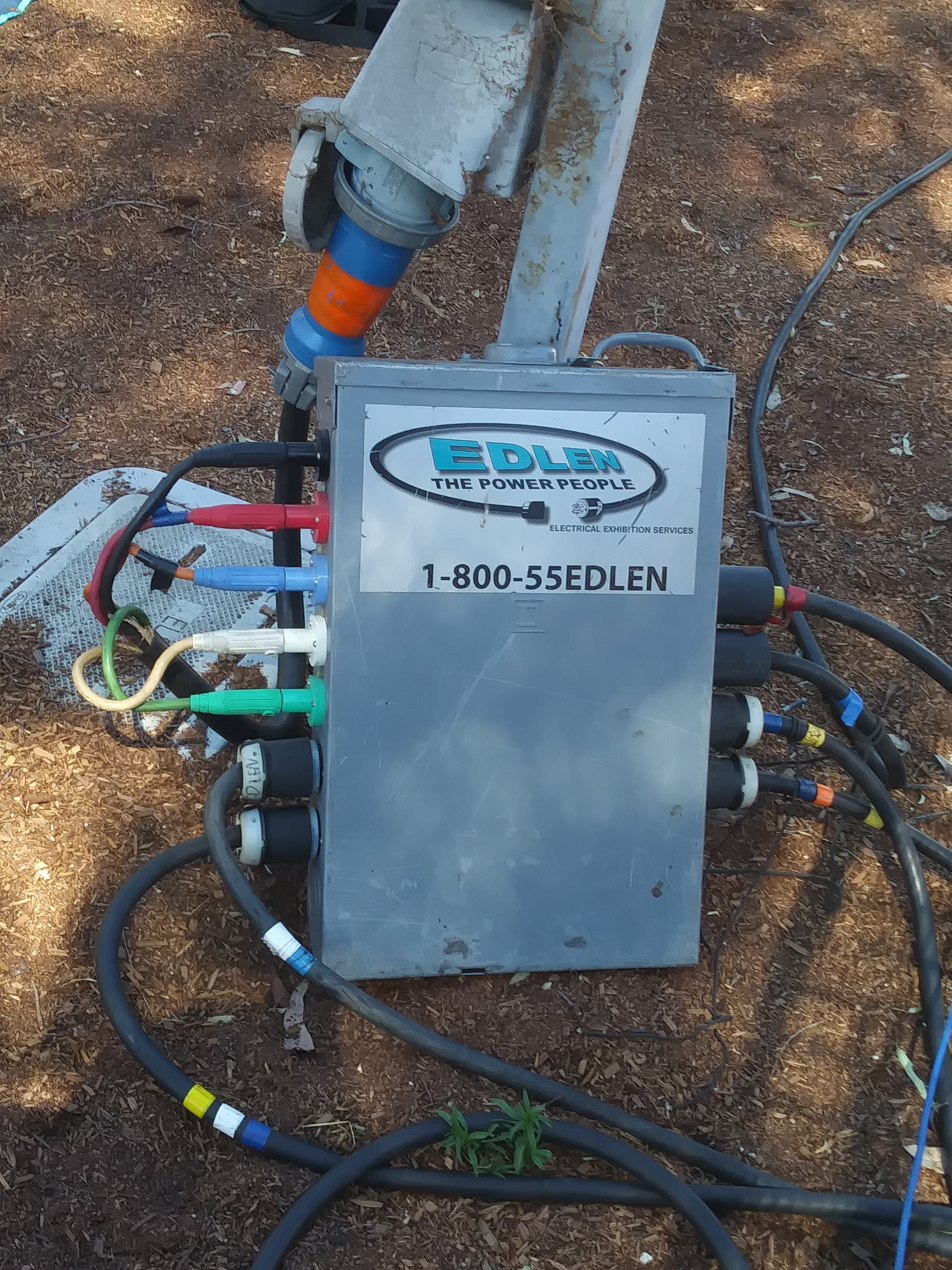
A temporary PDU, distributing 120-volt AC power at an outdoor event

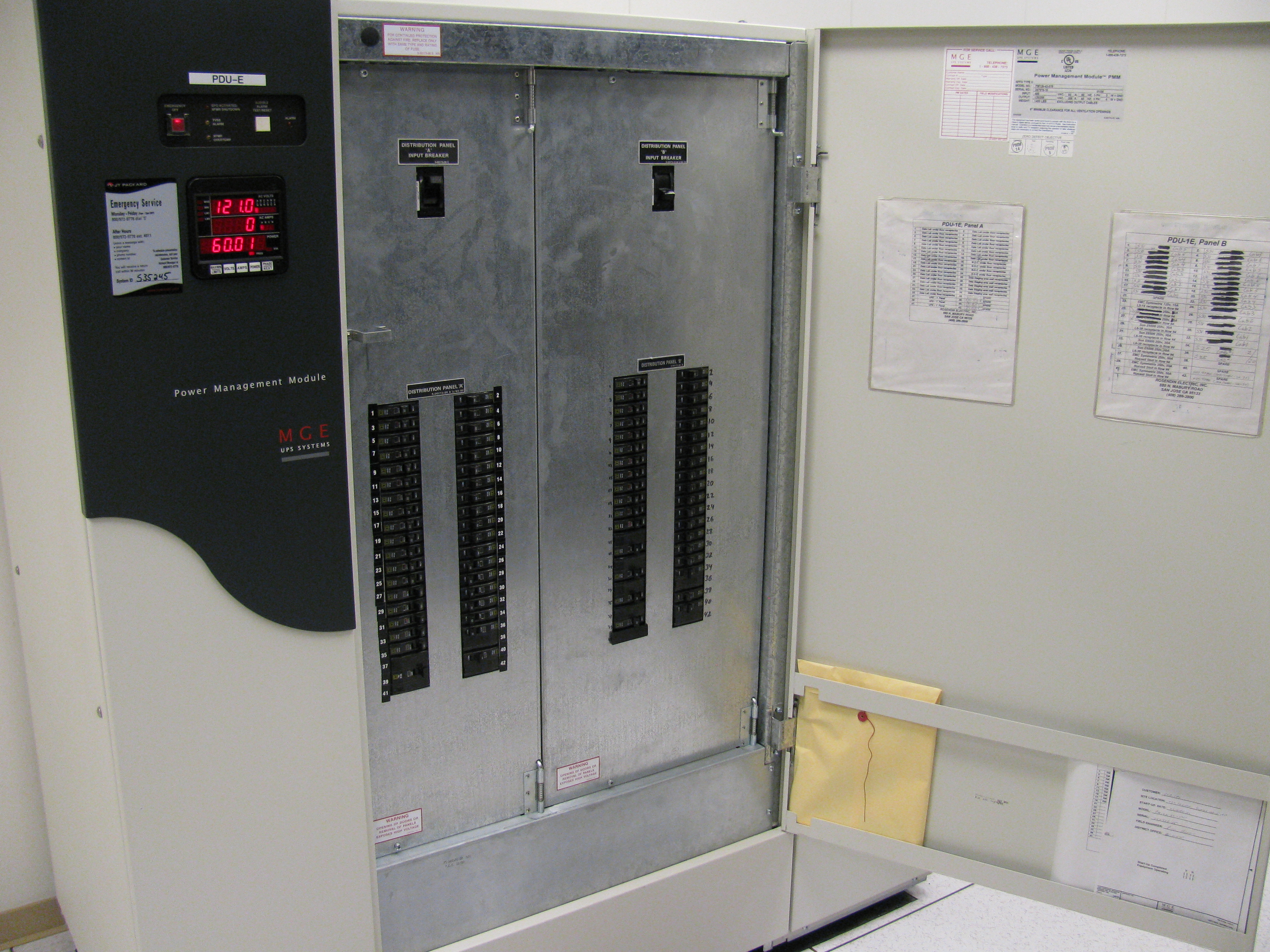
Cabinet PDU with access doors open

A power distribution unit (PDU) is a device fitted with multiple outputs designed to distribute electric power, especially to racks of computers and networking equipment located within a data center. Data centers face challenges in power protection and management solutions. This is why many data centers rely on PDU monitoring to improve efficiency, uptime, and growth. For data center applications, the power requirement is typically much larger than a home or office style power strips with power inputs as large as 22 kilovolt-amperes or even greater. Most large data centers utilize PDUs with three-phase power input and one-phase power output. There are two main categories of PDUs: basic PDUs and intelligent (networked) PDUs or iPDUs. Basic PDUs simply provide a means of distributing power from the input to multiple outlets. Intelligent PDUs normally have a module that enables remote management of power metering information, power outlet on/off control and alarms. Some advanced PDUs allow users to manage external sensors such as temperature, humidity, airflow, etc.

== Form factors ==
PDUs vary from simple and inexpensive rack-mounted power strips to larger floor-mounted PDUs with multiple functions including power filtering to improve power quality, intelligent load balancing, and remote monitoring and control by Simple Network Management Protocol (SNMP) over LAN. This kind of PDU placement offers intelligent capabilities such as power metering at the inlet, outlet, and PDU branch circuit level and support for environment sensors.

Newer generation of intelligent PDUs allow for IP consolidation, which means many PDUs can be linked in an array under a single IP address. Next-generation models also offer integration with electronic locks, providing the ability to network and manage PDUs and locks through the same appliance.

In data centers, larger PDUs are needed to power multiple server cabinets. Each server cabinet or row of cabinets may require multiple high-current circuits, possibly from different phases of incoming power or different UPSs. Standalone cabinet PDUs are self-contained units that include main circuit breakers, individual circuit breakers, and power monitoring panels. The cabinet provides internal bus bars for neutral and grounding. Prepunched top and bottom panels allow for safe cable entry.

== See also ==
- Uninterruptible power supply
- AC power plugs and sockets
