= Lebert =

Lebert is a surname. Notable people with the surname include:

- Benjamin Lebert (born 1982), German author
- Helmut Lebert (born 1941), German rower
- Hermann Lebert (1813–1878), German physician
- Sigmund Lebert (1821–1884), German pianist

== See also ==
- Liebert (surname)
- Libert (disambiguation)
