= Liberté =

Liberté may refer to:

== Geography ==
- Liberté station, a Paris Metro station
- Fort-Liberté, the administrative capital of the Nord-Est department, Haiti
- Liberté (Hong Kong), a project of residential skyscrapers in Cheung Sha Wan, Hong Kong

== Ships ==
- SS Liberté, a French ocean liner known as SS Europa prior to 1950
- Liberté-class battleship, a pre-dreadnought class of battleships of the French Navy
- French battleship Liberté, the lead battleship of the Liberté class, destroyed by explosion in 1911
- P&O Liberté, 2022 ferry operating between Calais and Dover

== Books and publications ==
- Liberté (poem), by Paul Éluard 1942
- Liberté (Algeria), a French-language newspaper in Algeria 1992–2022
- Liberté, an underground paper of the French Resistance published by François de Menthon
- Liberté de Fitchburg, American newspaper
- Liberté (Quebec), literary magazine 1959–present
- La Liberté (Canada), Canadian newspaper, Manitoba
- La Liberté (French newspaper), a Paris newspaper 1865–1940
- La Liberté (Switzerland), a Swiss newspaper 1871–present

== Film and games ==
- Liberté (fr), 1939 French film with Maurice Escande playing Auguste Bartholdi, creator of the Statue of Liberty 1937
- Liberté I, a 1962 French film
- Liberté, 2010 French Romani film known in English as Korkoro
- Liberté, a 2001 board game by Martin Wallace
- Liberté (2019 film), a drama film

== Music ==
- Liberté (anthem), the national anthem of Guinea
- "O Liberté", aria by Massenet from Le jongleur de Notre-Dame
- "Liberté", final section of Poulenc's Figure humaine, setting the Eluard poem

=== Albums ===
- Liberté, a 1972 album by Les Poppys
- Liberté, a 1977 album by Jairo, with the title track a setting of the Eluard poem
- Liberté, a 1984 album by Gilbert Montagné
- Liberté, a 1984 album by Anne-Marie Nzié
- Liberté, a 1987 album by Takako Okamura
- Liberté, a 1992 album by Sonia M'barek
- Liberté, a 2000 classical album by Grex Vocalis
- Liberté (Khaled album), 2009
- Liberté, a 2014 album by Nicolas Kummert
- Liberté (The Doobie Brothers album), 2021

=== Songs ===
- "Liberté", song by Charles Aznavour and Maurice Vidalin from Aznavour 65
- "Liberté", song by Gilles Marchal 1971
- "Liberté", song by Anne-Marie Nzié
- "Liberté", song by Carla Bruni from Little French Songs
- "Liberté" (fr), single setting the Eluard poem by Les Enfoirés for the 2016 charity concert for the Restaurants du Cœur
- "La Liberté", song by French singer Tal from Le droit de rêver

== Other ==
- Liberté Inc., a Canadian manufacturer and distributor of dairy and deli foods
- Liberté chérie, a 7-member Belgian masonic lodge in World War II

== See also ==
- Liberté, égalité, fraternité, the national motto of France
- Liberty (disambiguation)
- Libert (disambiguation)
- Liebert (disambiguation)
