= Pivovar Broumov =

Brewery in Broumov, Czech Republic

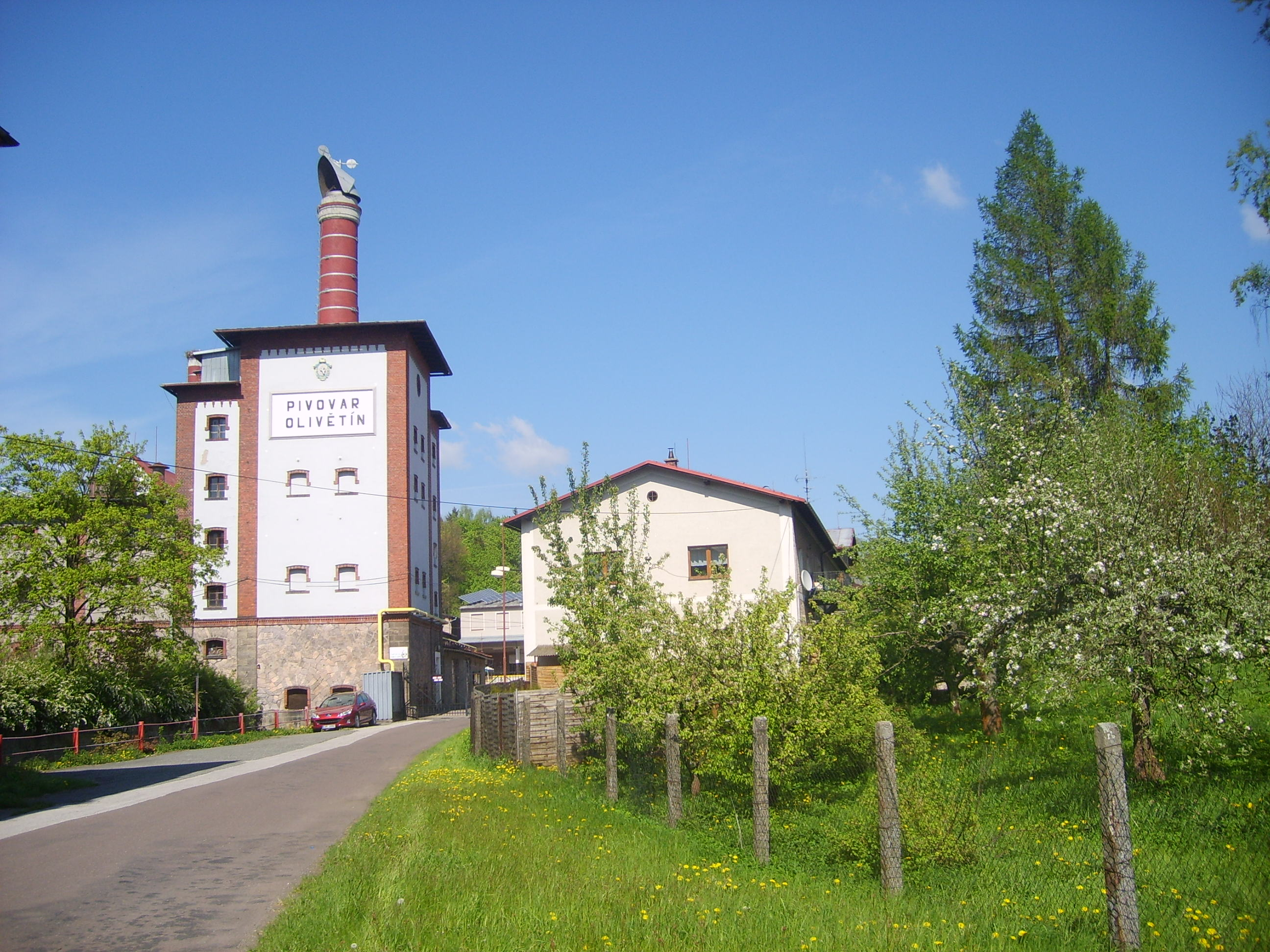
- Interactive map of Pivovar Broumov
- Location: Broumov, Czech Republic
- Coordinates: 50°36′13.6″N 16°20′4.36″E
- Opened: 1348
- Owner: Pivovar Broumov s.r.o.
- Website: Pivovar Broumov

Pivovar Broumov is a small east Bohemian brewery located in Broumov, Olivětín, Czech Republic. The brewery produces light, dark, and amber beers, both filtered and unfiltered (lagers, draught beers, and other specialty beers). Additionally, it produces several types of flavored beers with fruit, spiced, and herbal varieties.

== History and present ==
The origins of the brewery can be traced back to 1348. The current brewery continues the activities of a brewery that was originally located in the Benedictine monastery in Broumov, founded in 1712. References to the local monastery brewery exist from the end of the 17th century.

After World War II, a new brewhouse was built and the brewery began bottling its beer. Since 1994, a new bottling facility has been in operation, and its wort is stored in stainless steel barrels. At the Milevsko Beer Festival, the beer Polotmavá sváteční kvasnicová 17% (Amber Festive Yeast 17%) won the Silver Crown for the best beer.

Near the brewery is a pond with an area of approximately 0.75 hectares (1.9 acres). It currently serves as a water supply for the technological part of the brewery. In the past, the pond was used during the winter to obtain ice for cooling processes in beer production.

== Ingredients for beer production ==
Malt for the brewery is produced in its own classic drum malt house. The brewery also uses hop cones from Žatec and first-class brewing yeast. The water required for beer production is drawn from a 38-metre (125 ft) deep artesian well.

== Beer production ==
The brewery is known for preserving traditional production processes. It produces a wide range of beers sold under the brands Olivětínský Opat, Benediktin, and Rotter. It offers light, amber, and dark beers and has a constant and changing selection of beer specials. In addition to the standard range of filtered beers, it offers customers a unique range of unfiltered beers. The selection also includes flavored beers. The brewery's range of beers and souvenirs is offered in the on-site store located in the brewery complex.

== Brewery tour and brewing museum ==
Visitors can take guided tours of the brewery with beer tastings. The tour includes visits to the malt house, brewery cellars, bottling facility, and more. Within the brewery complex, there is also a brewing museum with a fairly extensive collection of historical technologies, machinery, malt and brewing tools. The tour also includes a visit to a stylized pub from the early 20th century and the old brewmaster's office. On the first floor of the museum, there is an exhibition showcases the brewmaster's household from the early 20th century (Art Nouveau period).

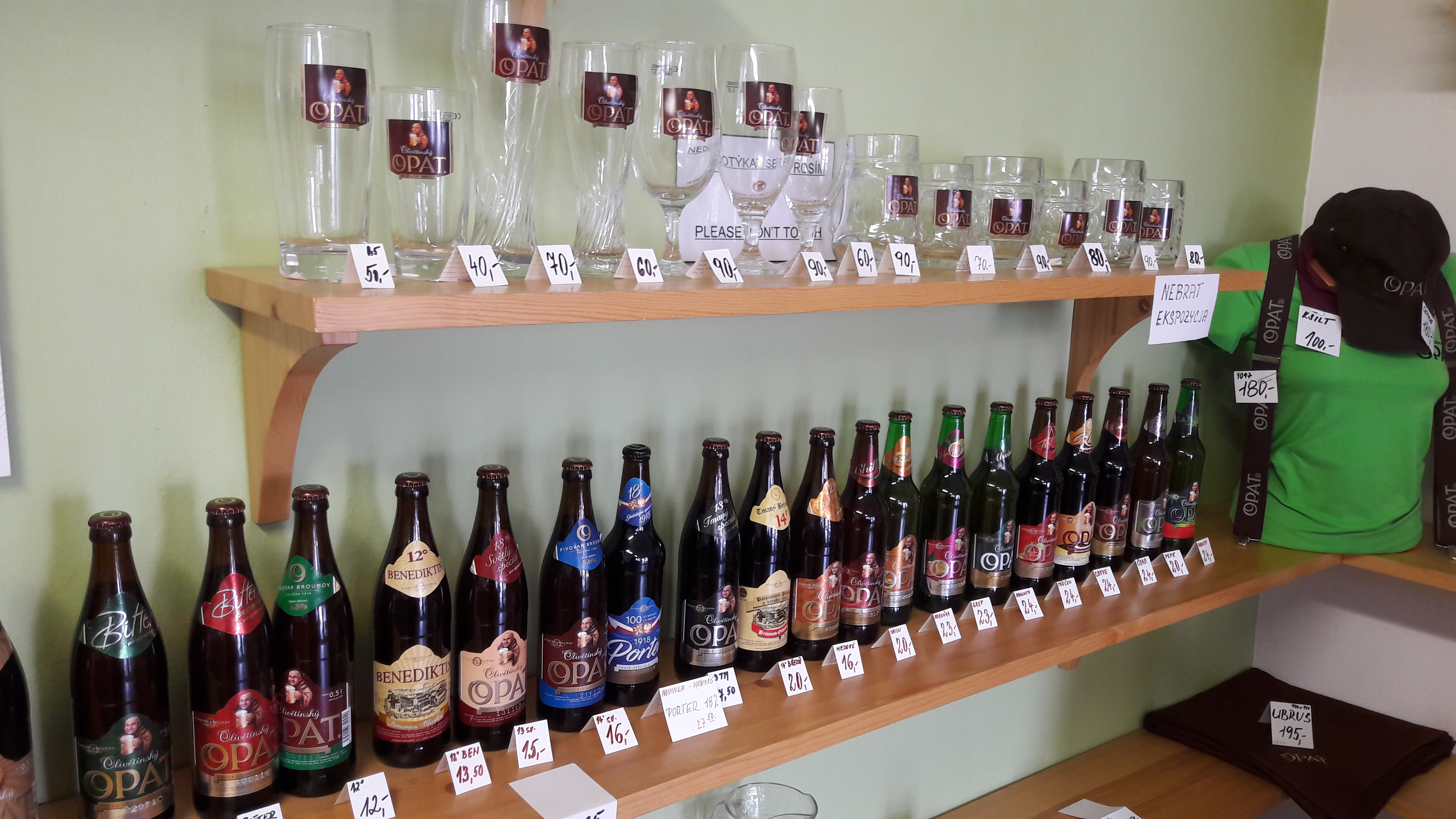
Displayed assortment
