= Lippert =

Lippert is a German surname. Notable people with the surname include:

- Bernhard Lippert (born 1962), German football manager
- Bill Lippert (born 1950), American politician and gay rights activist
- Donald Francis Lippert, American Roman Catholic bishop
- George Lippert (1844–1906), German-American sideshow performer born with three legs and two hearts
- Howard Vernon, born Mario Lippert (1914–1996), Swiss actor
- James G. Lippert (1917–2010), American politician
- Julius Lippert (1895–1956), German Nazi politician, mayor of Berlin 1937–1940
- Julius Lippert (historian) (1839–1909), Czech historian
- Liane Lippert (born 1999), German cyclist
- Lothar Lippert (born 1939), German field hockey player
- Margaret H. Lippert (born 1942), American author
- MaryAnn Lippert (born 1953), American health educator, health administrator and politician
- Mark Lippert (born 1973), American politician
- Michael Lippert (1897–1969), Nazi SS concentration camp commandant
- Robert L. Lippert (1909–1976), American film producer and theater chain owner
- Rudolf Lippert (1900–1945), German World War II army Generalmajor and Olympic equestrian
- Sofie Lippert (born 1995), Danish politician
- Wolfgang Lippert (actor), German entertainer and actor
- Wolfgang Lippert (pilot) (1914–1941), World War II Luftwaffe flying ace

== See also ==
- Liebert (disambiguation)
- Liepert
- Lipper
