= Liebert =

Liebert may refer to:

- Liebert (surname)
- Liebert (company)

== See also ==
- Mary Ann Liebert, Inc., publishing company
- Libert (disambiguation)
- Lippert
