= Libert =

Libert may refer to:

== Given name ==
- Lietbertus (1010–1076), bishop of Cambrai from 1051 to 1076
- Libert of Saint-Trond (died 783), Belgian saint
- Libert H. Boeynaems (1857–1926), Belgian-born apostolic vicar of the Hawaiian Islands
- Libert Froidmont (1587–1653), Liégeois theologian and scientist

== Surname ==
- David Libert (born 1943), American music executive and musician
- Georg Emil Libert (1820–1908), Danish painter
- Jarno Libert (born 1997), Belgian footballer
- Marie-Anne Libert (1782–1865), Belgian botanist and mycologist
- Reginaldus Libert (fl. 1425–1435), French composer
- Vincent Libert, Belgian sports shooter

== Other uses ==
- Libertarianism
- Libertarian Party (disambiguation)

== See also ==
- Liberté (disambiguation)
- Liberty (disambiguation)
- Liebert (disambiguation)
