= Clement Liebert =

Franco-Flemish singer and composer

Clement Liebert (fl. 1433–1454) was a Franco-Flemish singer and composer of the early Renaissance, active in Rome and at the Burgundian court.

His life is only documented briefly for two periods. Like many composers who originated in the modern-day Low Countries, he spent time in Italy, and sang in the papal chapel in 1433. His presence is also recorded in the Burgundian court chapel, where he was employed as a singer from 1441 to 1454.

Only one piece of music is securely attributed to him, a song entitled Comment porray. The manuscript containing it, formerly in the Strasbourg Bibliothèque Municipale, was destroyed on 24 August 1870, during the Siege of Strasbourg in the Franco-Prussian War.

It is not known if Liebert was related to Reginaldus Libert (Liebert), another Burgundian composer who was one of the first to use fauxbourdon in a setting of the Ordinary of the Mass. It is also possible that Clement Liebert is the same as a J. de Climen, a composer of around 1430, to whom a two-voice canon was attributed in a manuscript formerly from a Strasbourg library, now destroyed.
