= Hynek Martinec =

Czech-British painter

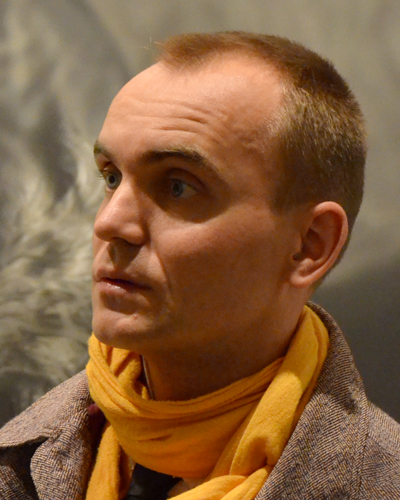
- Martinec (2015)
- Born: 12 November 1980 (age 45); Broumov, Czechoslovakia
- Education: Academy of Fine Arts, Prague
- Partner: Zuzana Jungmanová
- Awards: BP Portrait Award
- Website: http://www.hynekmartinec.com/

Hynek Martinec (born 12 November 1980 in Broumov) is a Czech-British painter, who graduated from the Studio of Classical Painting Techniques under the supervision of Zdeněk Beran at the Academy of Fine Arts, Prague. After his studies he left for Paris (2005-2007) and since 2007 has been living in London. He received the prestigious BP Young Artist Award (2007) for his hyperrealistic portraits. His paintings are inspired by Old Masters and/or photographs, which link the past with the future, using modern technologies.

== Life ==
In his hometown of Broumov and its surroundings Hynek Martinec was able to absorb the architecture of Dientzenhofer together with Czech Baroque painting. Since his childhood he drew extensively and already when he was 8–9 years old he discovered the world of classical music. As an 11-year-old boy, in 1991, he was successful in an art competition in Náchod and one painter of the jury offered him private classes and a thorough training in realistic painting. A year later he was taking classes from another painter, who exposed him to the world of abstract art.

After finishing primary school Martinec studied design at Uherské Hradiště for one year and then transferred to the Secondary Art School of Václav Hollar in Prague. Between 1999 and 2005 he studied at the Academy of Fine Arts, Prague at the Studio of Classical Painting Techniques under the supervision of Zdeněk Beran. During his studies he spent an exchange year at Middlesex University, London (2002) and a six-month exchange at the Cooper Union in New York (2004). In 2003, he received a studio award from the Academy of Fine Arts and in 2004 he was awarded as the best Academy student.

Following graduation he spent two years in Paris in a rented studio before deciding to move to London after receiving the Young Artist Award for artists under 30 in 2007, and at the same time the BP Visitor Choice for his portrait of Zuzana in Paris Studio (2006-2007). The painting was chosen among 60 finalists from 1,870 applications. In 2008 he received the Changing Faces Prize organised by the National Portrait Gallery, London for the painting Bagram in New York (2004) and BP Visitor Choice at the Scottish National Portrait Gallery in Edinburgh.

Hynek Martinec lives and works in London and is represented by Parafin Gallery. His partner Zuzana Jungmanová heads the Czech School Without Borders with around 200 children from the Czech community in London.

=== Awards ===
- 1991 Art Competition, Náchod
- 2003 Studio Award of the Academy of Fine Arts in Prague
- 2007 BP Young Artist Award, BP Visitor Choice, National Portrait Gallery, London
- 2008 The Changing Faces Prize, Royal Society of Portrait Painters, London, BP Visitor Choice, Scottish National Portrait Gallery, Edinburgh

== Work ==
Works during his college days include still lifes, winter mountain landscapes and several portraits. Painted during his studies in New York his portrait called Begram in NY (2004) was later awarded The Changing Faces prize . His graduation project included five large-format genre paintings from the Motol Hospital.

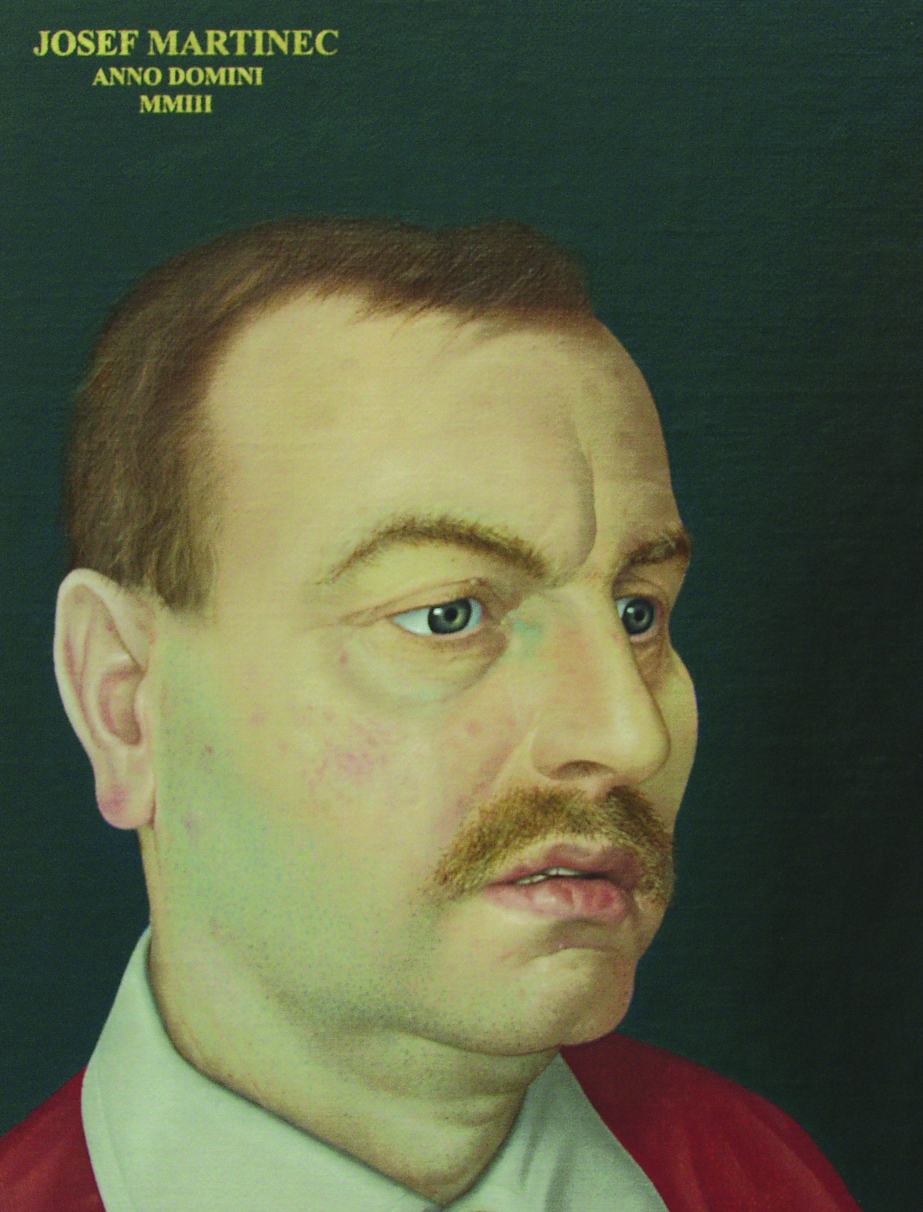
Josef, 2003

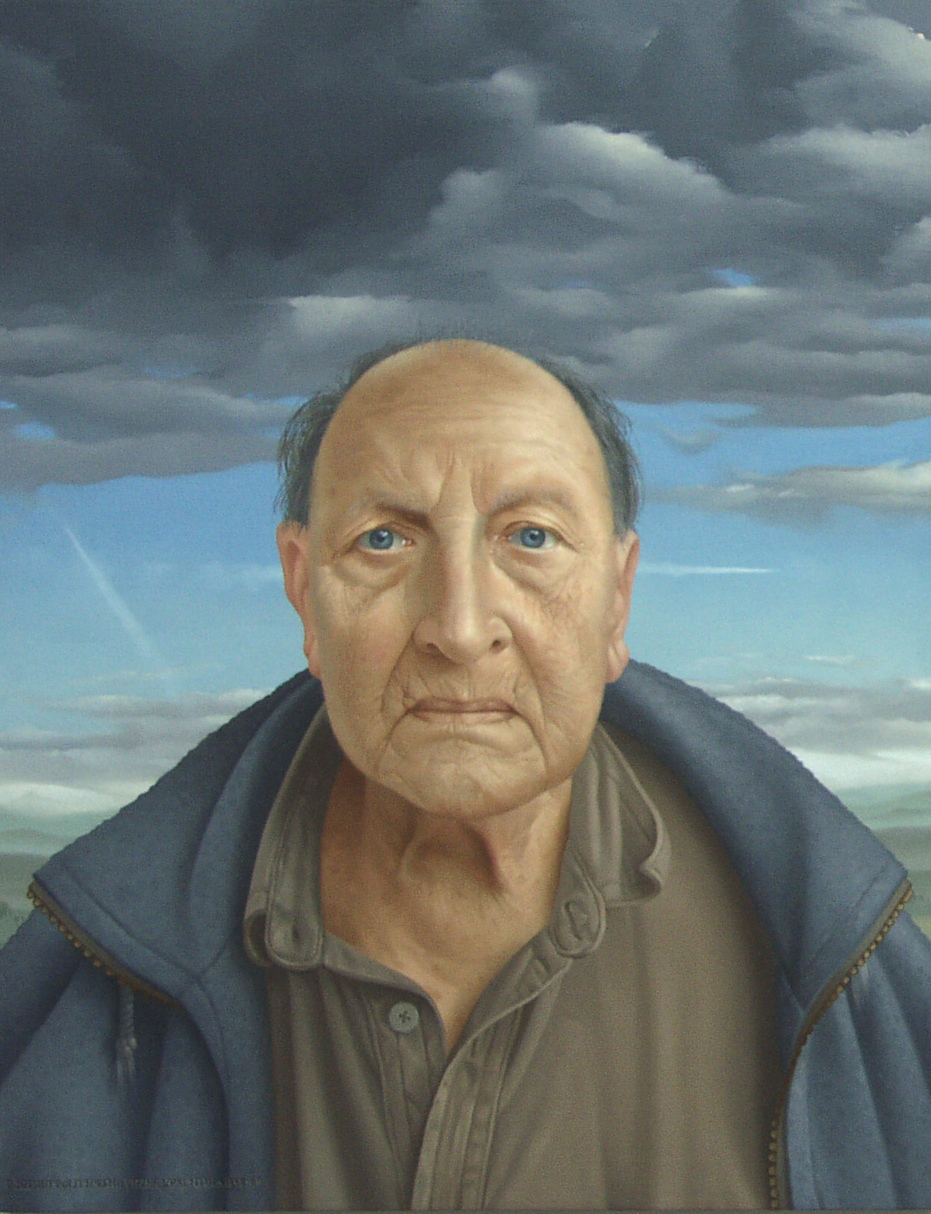
Bachtik, 2004

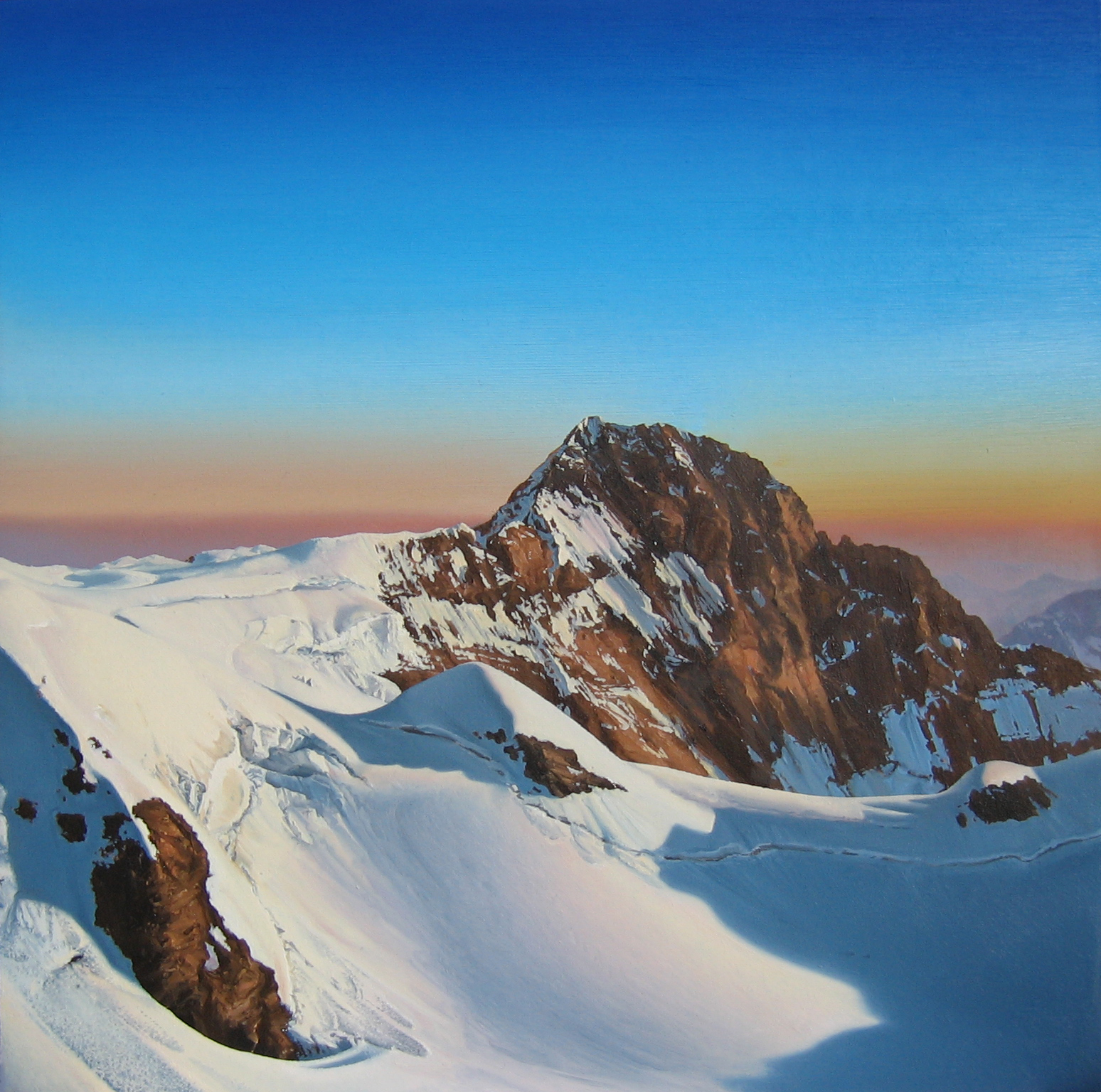
Oberland 2, 2005

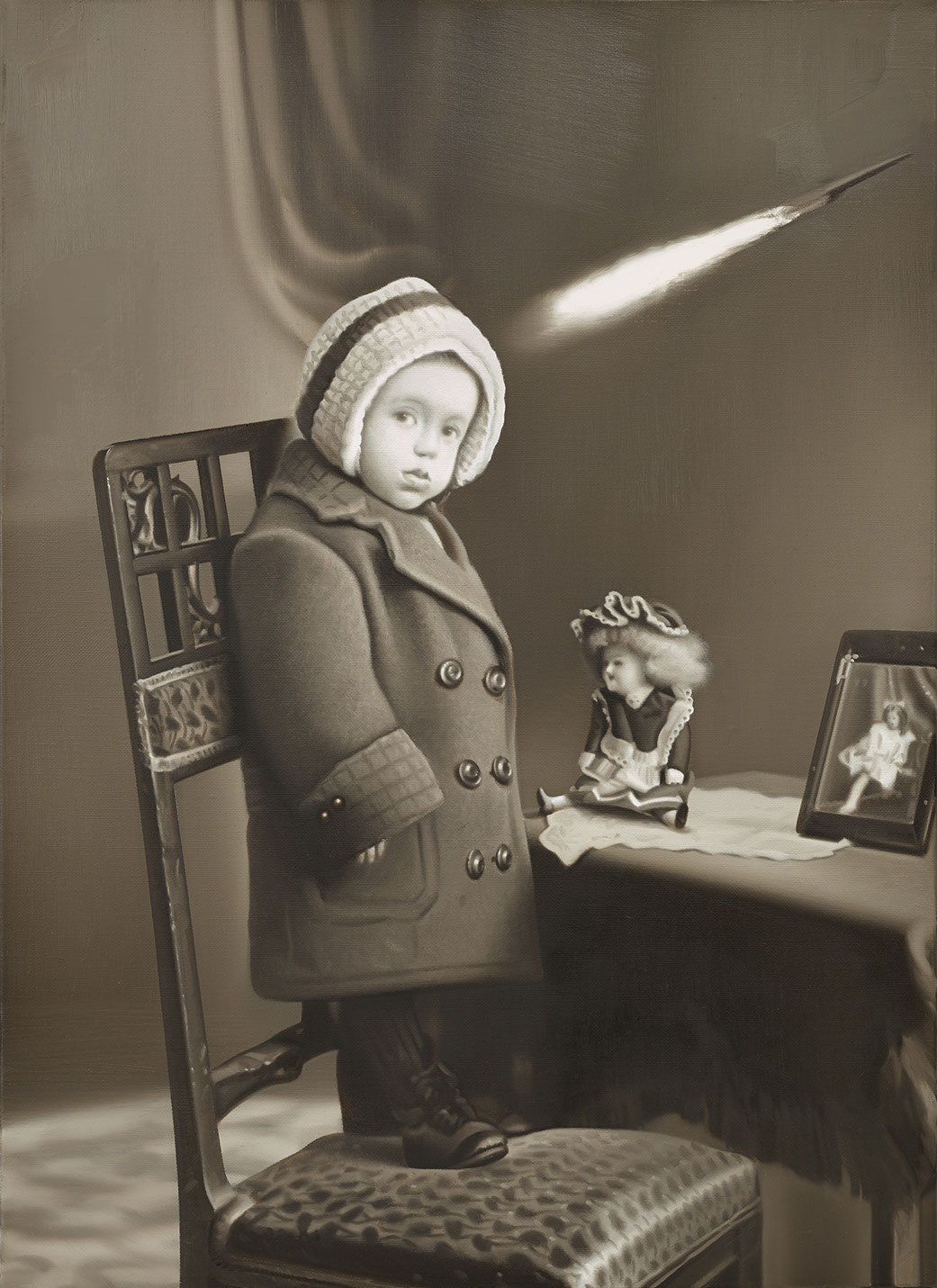
Good Morning Young Artist, 2014

When a friend offered him the use of his studio in Paris, Martinec focused primarily on the project Cabling (2005-2007) that he perceived as a way to scan the past. Paris inspired him to use more colours and abstract painting. At the same time, he created a hyperrealistic portrait of his partner Zuzana Jungmanová. Zuzana’s glasses mirror the whole studio space, even with a fragment of the Paris landscape behind the window. The painting thus represents a record of the painter’s life in this period. Martinec applied with the portrait Zuzana in Paris Studio (2006-2007) to the prestigious National Portrait Gallery, London, BP Portrait Award competition and received the first prize for artists under 30, a success which prompted his move to London.

In 2008, he created the project Lost in Time inspired by the brutalist architecture of the National Theatre and the colourful patterns projected on its façade. At the centre of the whole series are black and white brush drawings, dark atmosphere and subtle artificial colouring.

After three years in London, painting mostly city motifs, Hynek Martinec realised that he had exhausted the possibilities of hyperrealist painting and started missing its emotional aspect. He got in touch with his photographer friend, a connoisseur of old photographic techniques. And through the creation of ambrotypes and daguerreotypes of Zuzana, he consequently transferred to monochrome large-format painting (Zuzana 1848, 2012, 244 x 184 cm, Zuzana 1854, 2012, 255 x 184 cm), attempting a certain journey back in time. The photographic technique of the 19th century presented the topic of time from a different angle than the painted image. By simulating old photographic technical aspects these paintings are freed from the boundaries of hyperrealism and move towards imagination of an autonomous parallel world. For a certain period, Martinec left acrylic behind and started his series of monochrome oil paintings in the historicising tone of sepia brown, resembling old photographs and which he continues to today.

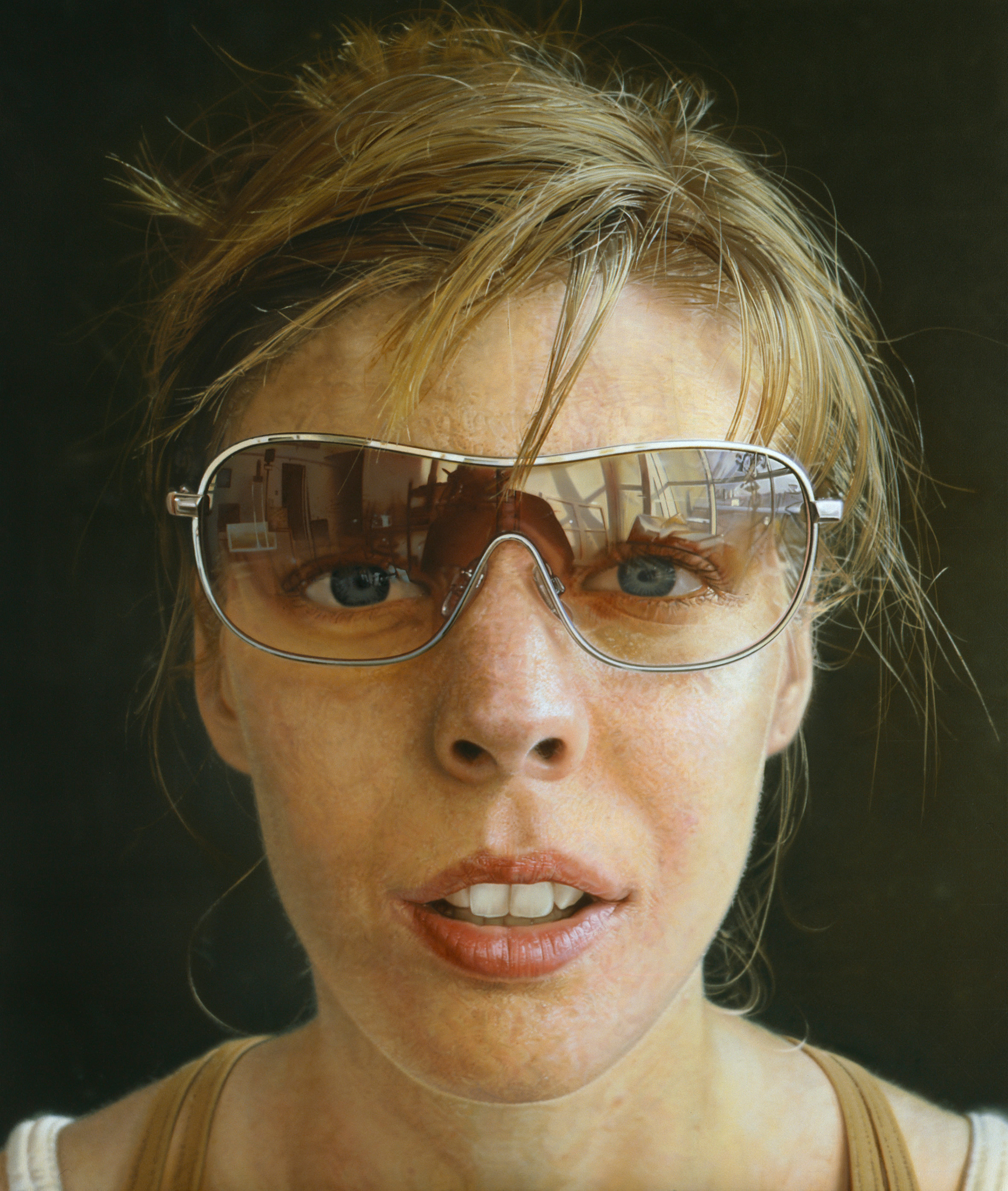
Zuzana in Paris studio, 130 x 110 cm, 2006-2007 (BP Young Artist Award)

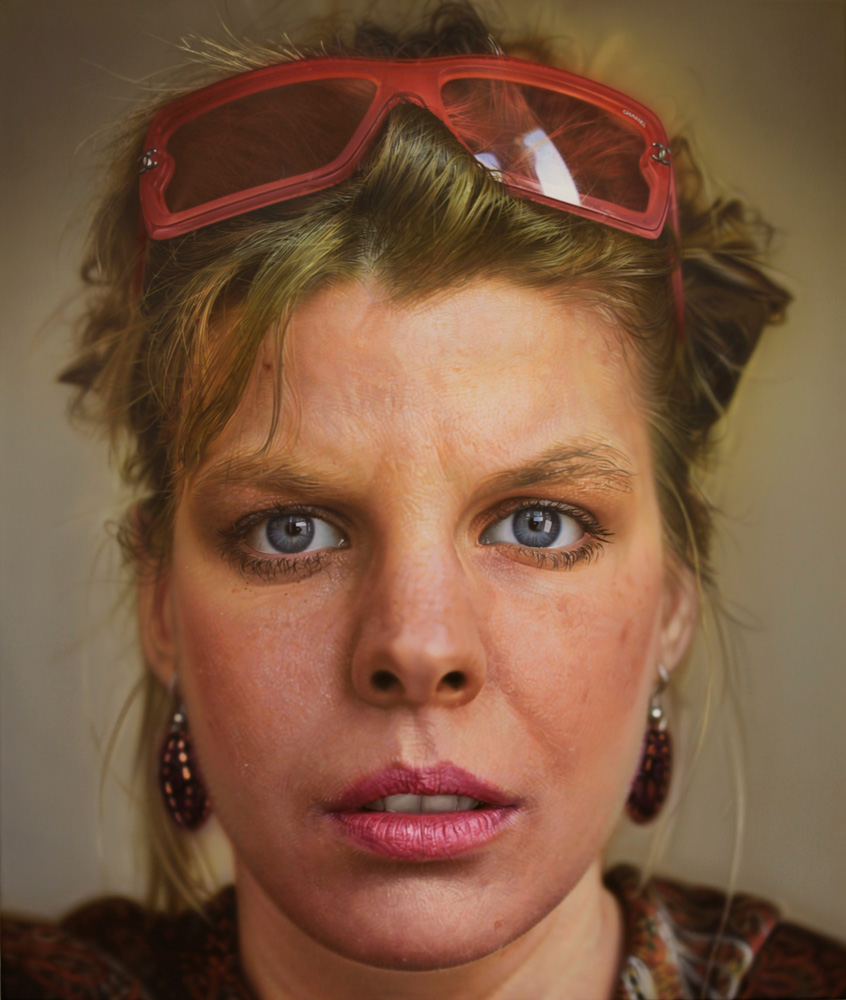
Zuzana in London, 130 x 110 cm, 2011-2012

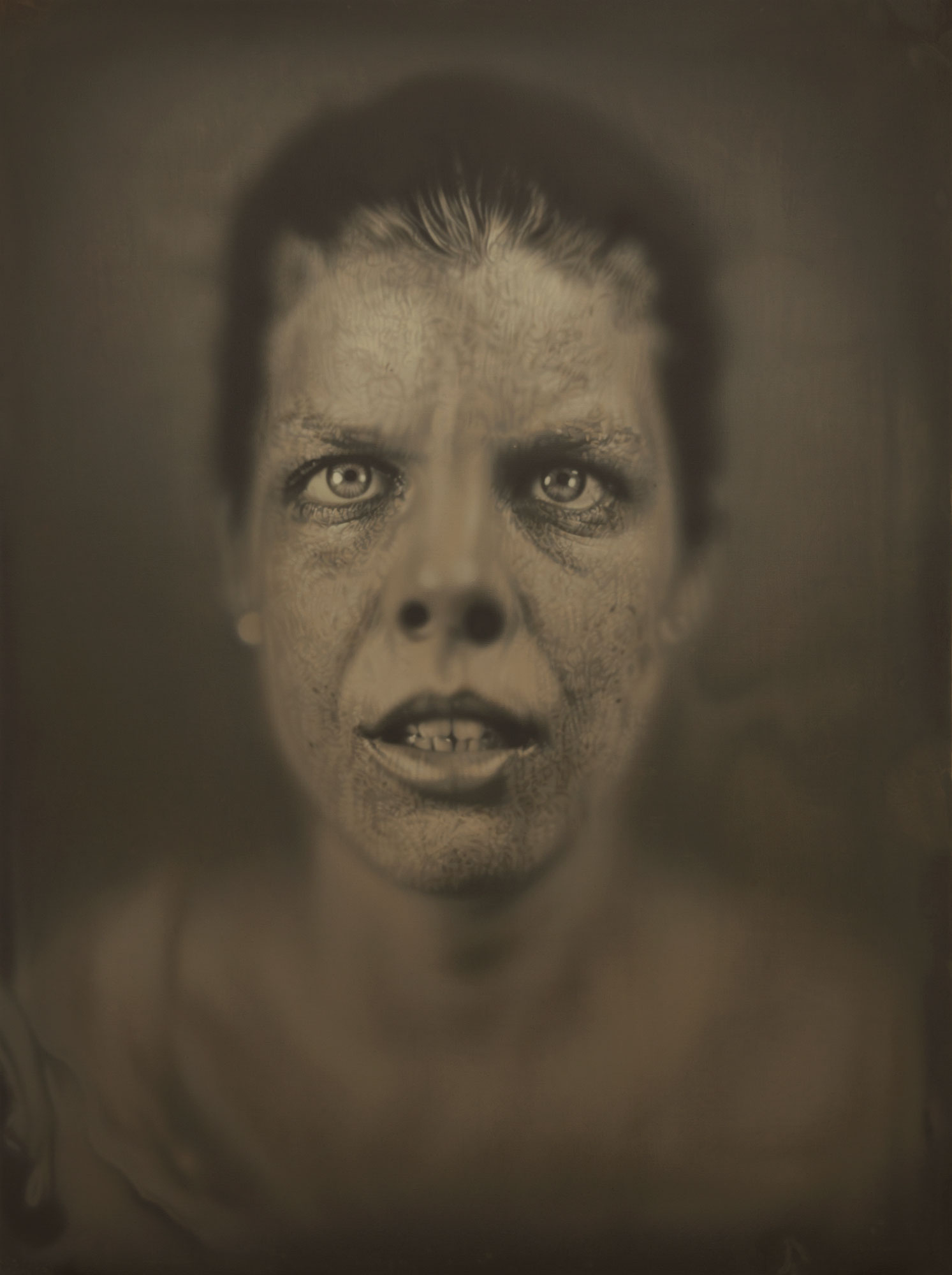
Zuzana 1848, 244 x 184 cm 2012

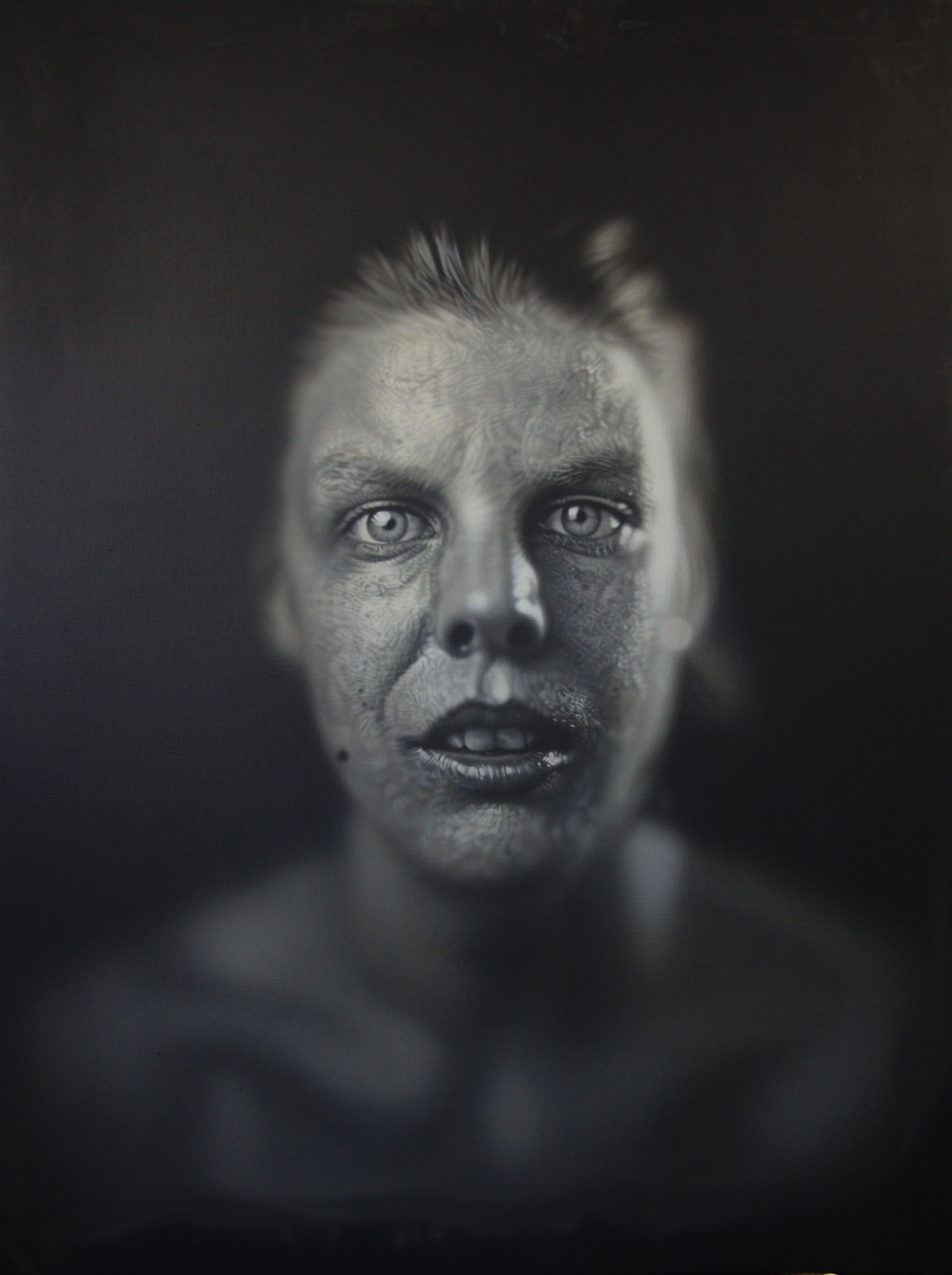
Zuzana 1854, 255 x 184 cm, 2012

In the following years, Martinec focused mostly on still lifes with existential undertones (Every Minute Closer to Death, 2013). Smaller formats often feature a quenched candle as a classical symbol of immortality (It Is Hard to Remember, 2014). The white paraffin could refer to the name of a gallery representing Martinec in London, but as such, also has a special aesthetic quality. At the point where the still life depicts only a single object, the technical perfection of painting becomes a tool towards meditating about time (Sigrun’s Bread, 2015) and sometimes he explicitly challenges the viewer to do so (The Propeller, 2015). The still lifes of Martinec created with the grisaille technique show his technical perfection. The sophisticated compositions play with archetypical devotional images and the theme of vanitas (Whipping of a Baroque Horse, 2017).

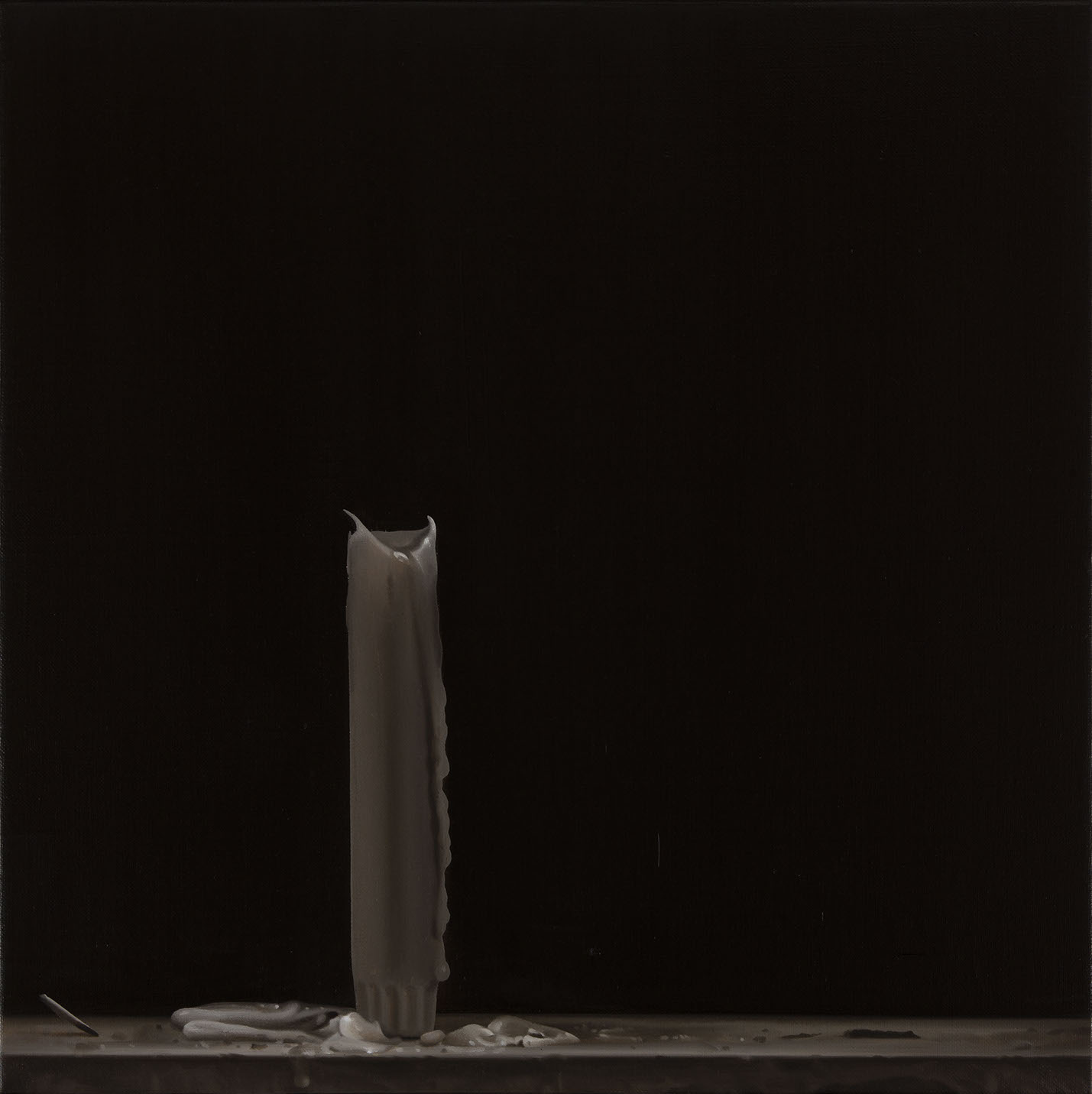
The Light Is In The Next Painting II, 2013

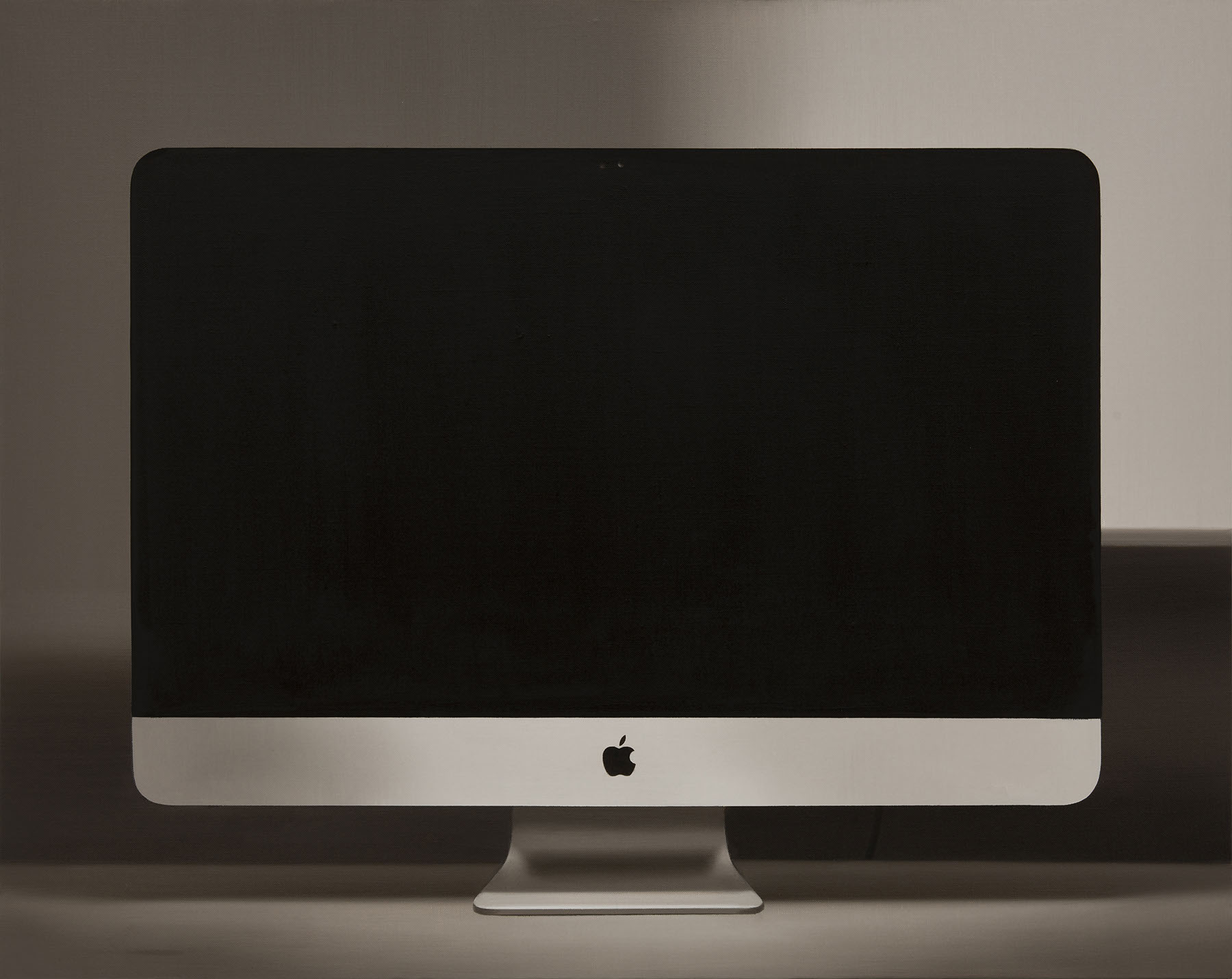
Every Generation Has Its Own Revolution, 2014

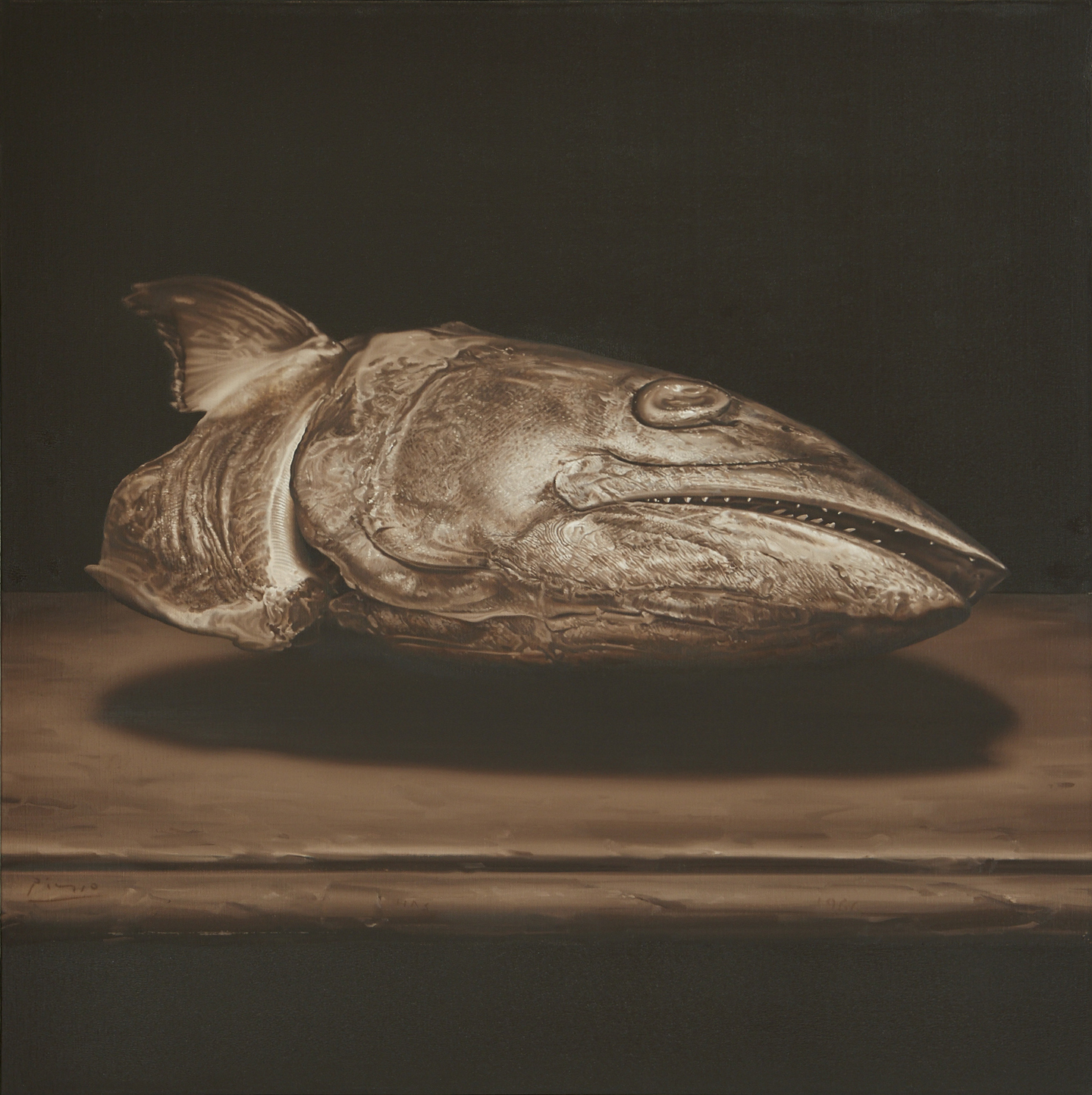
Picasso Has Seen Blow Up, 2015

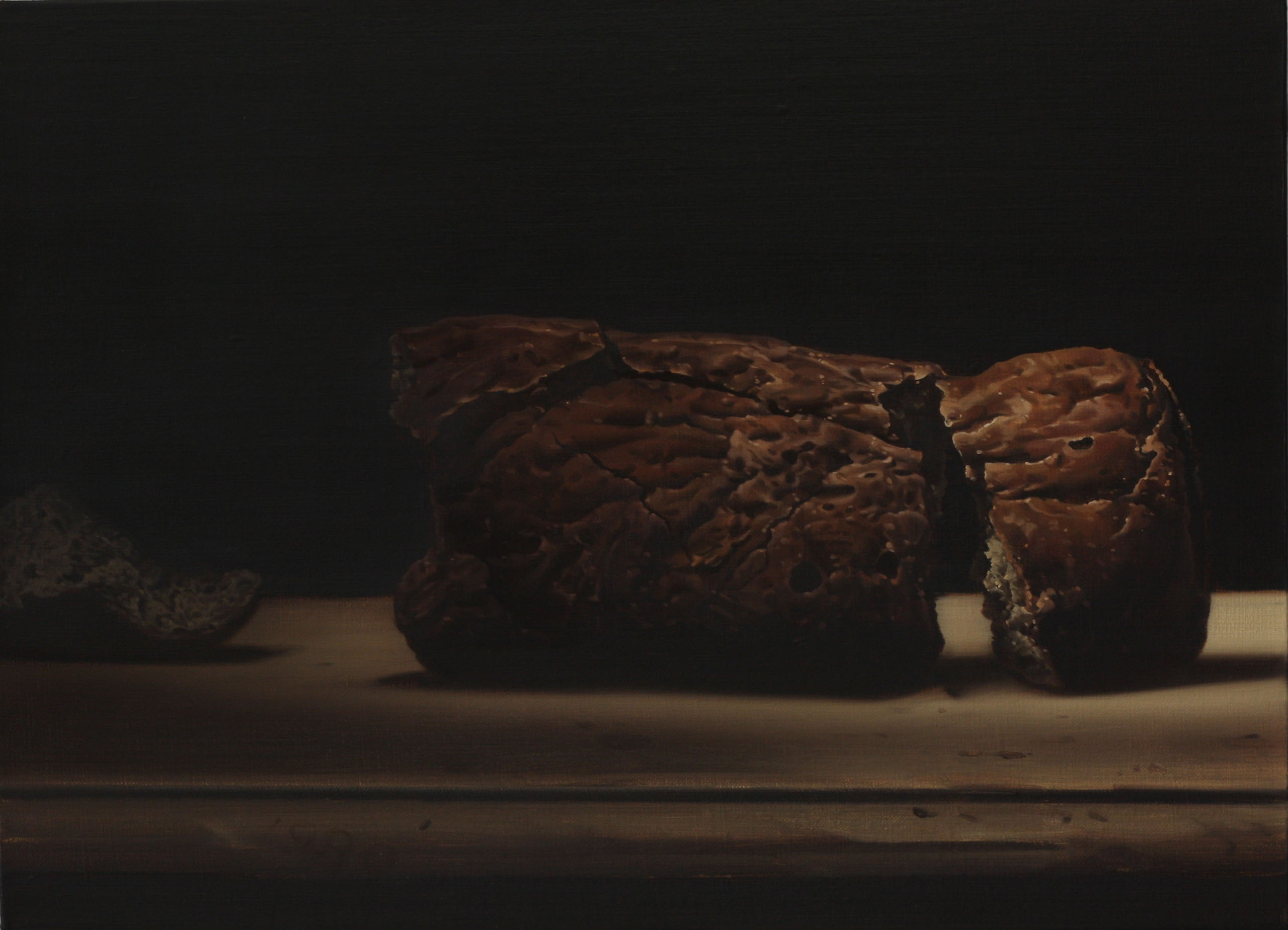
Sigrun's Bread (The New Romantic), 2015

As an abstract spatial model Martinec often uses shaving cream that, as an ephemeral form, represents an absolutely contemporary symbol of vanitas (Where Do You Wander, John, 2014). At times, the cream resembles Baroque stucco reliefs and bestows the work with hidden sexual undertone or on the contrary, isolated cold. An intense death cult standing at the core of the Catholic Baroque simultaneously bears a strong need to aestheticize death. “Ice-cold Baroque” of Martinec transforms the idea of the Baroque world and exposes death not in the figures of saints, but simply in perfect and finished forms. Some forms are executed as three-dimensional structures in the acrylic matter of jesmonite (Fantasy Meets Brutal Reality, 2018).

In 2014, he started to incorporate old photographs in oil paintings and with small details out of different context linked with the contemporary world (Flyover into the Different Time, 2014). Since 2015, a subtle colouring has been once again appearing in Martinec’ chiaroscuro still lifes (Sigrun’s Bread, 2015). The fascination with Old Masters is further intensified at his exhibition in 2015 in Prague. In this period, he created the painting El Greco is Watching (2016) that is a true black and white copy of El Greco’s Christ at the National Gallery in Prague. Other paintings are open combinations of art inspired by works such as the Baroque self-portrait by Anthony van Dyck with Magritte’s pipe (The Vision, 2016) and/or use allusions borrowed from different classical works to create new and unexpected combinations (Allegory of the Internet, 2017). The painter experiences the world he lives in, but the political events directly influencing his life are commented on with alternative and hidden symbols (Brussels, 2016; Brexit, 2016).

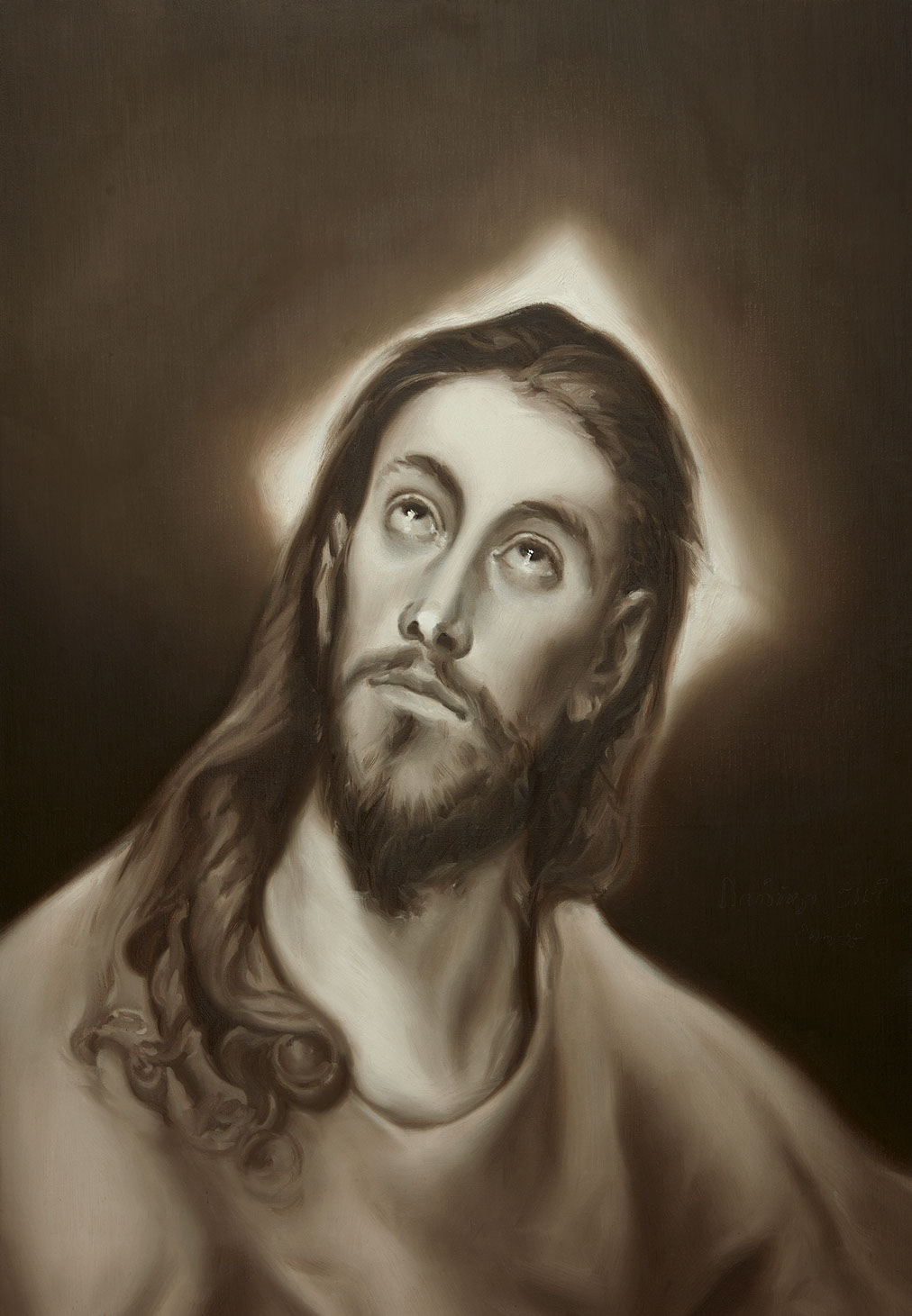
El Greco is Watching, 2016

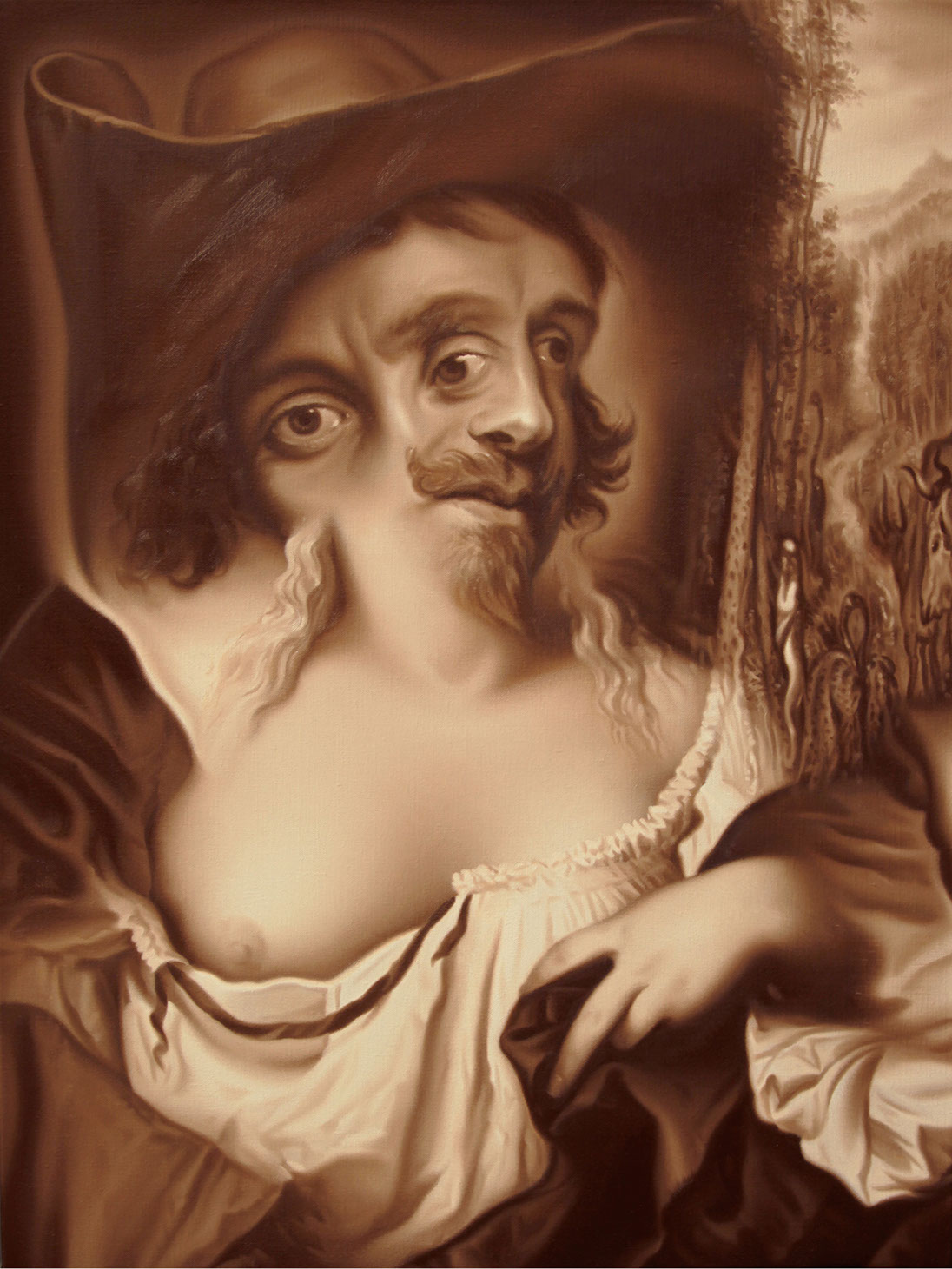
The Chocolate Labyrinth and Tea, 2016

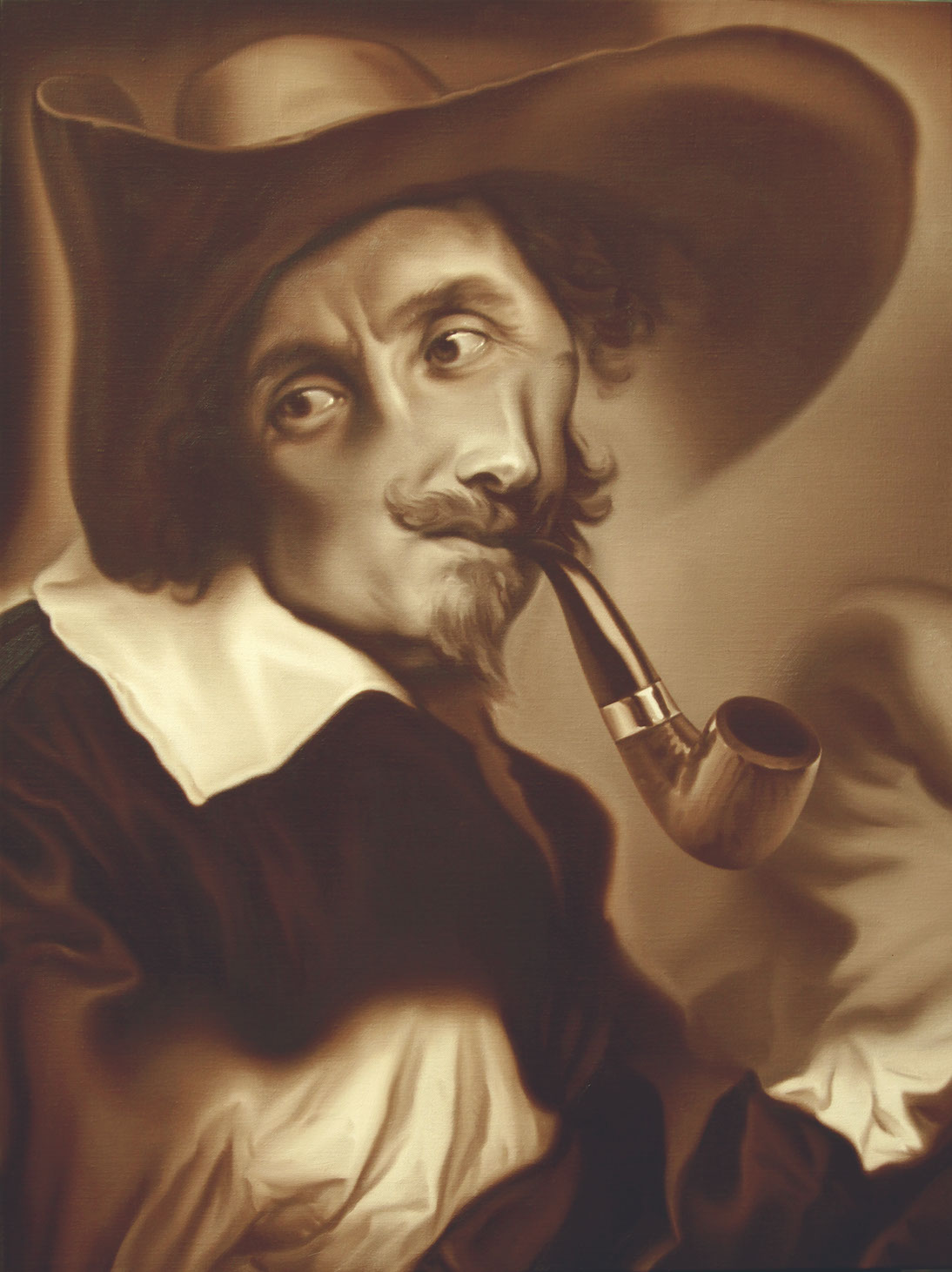
The Vision, 2016

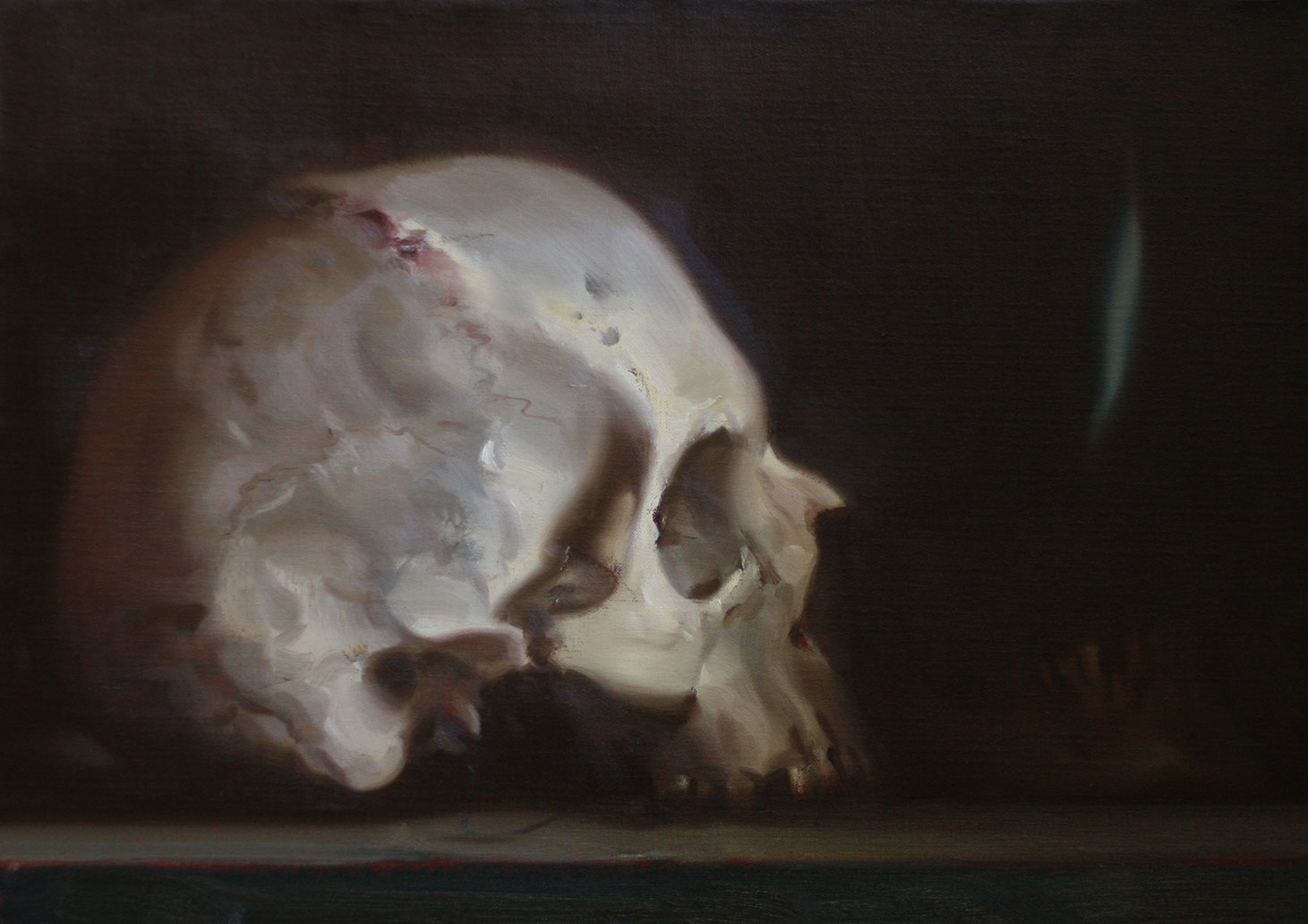
Brussels, 2016

The paintings by Martinec are preceded by an associative idea sourcing inspiration from literature or reflection of personal experiences linked to another artwork. References in titles of works are usually associated with philosophy, that of Nietzsche and Wittgenstein in particular, and topics of discussions with his brother (The Birth of Tragedies, 2018). Religious symbols have accompanied him since his youth spent at Broumov in an environment strongly shaped by the Baroque architecture of K. I. Dientzenhofer and they have remained a permanent part of his everyday life. In his works Martinec continues in a traditional European painting style, but presents it in a contemporary context turning towards the viewer today. He uses codes and symbols connecting the past with the present. Some autobiographical details penetrate his paintings in seemingly unrelated connections. One such symbol is a skull he caught a glimpse of as a child in a small village school he visited in Machov (Speak the Truth Even When Your Voice Shakes, 2013). At other times, the painting background reveals a panorama of a city where he spent the first six years of his life (Six Years of Tabula Rasa, 2013–14).

Martinec grew up in the 90s, a period of transformation thanks to computers and new media. His generation perceives the omnipresence of modern technologies with existential seriousness as a paradigm shift and attempts to react (Every Generation Has Its Own Revolution, 2014) or use it creatively in their work. Using 3D programmes on his computer Martinec creates paintings that serve more as models for immaterial sculpture. His motivation for a painting might be a drawing record of a dream, mixing saved images with an everyday reality, screening events hidden under the surface and creating surprising connections. A series of drawings after the Old Masters present Martinec with a tool to pull down the borders of time and link his work with artists he started to favour during his gallery visits. These motifs were consequently used in surreal Mannerist and/or Neo-Baroque compositions arbitrarily linking Old Masters references with elements of the contemporary world (Whirl of Nightmares, 2017). Instead of drafts he uses digital photographs of real objects that can be freely manipulated. Before he transfers it to canvas, the painting composition is created as an artificial reality through crossfading and dynamic distortion in Photoshop.

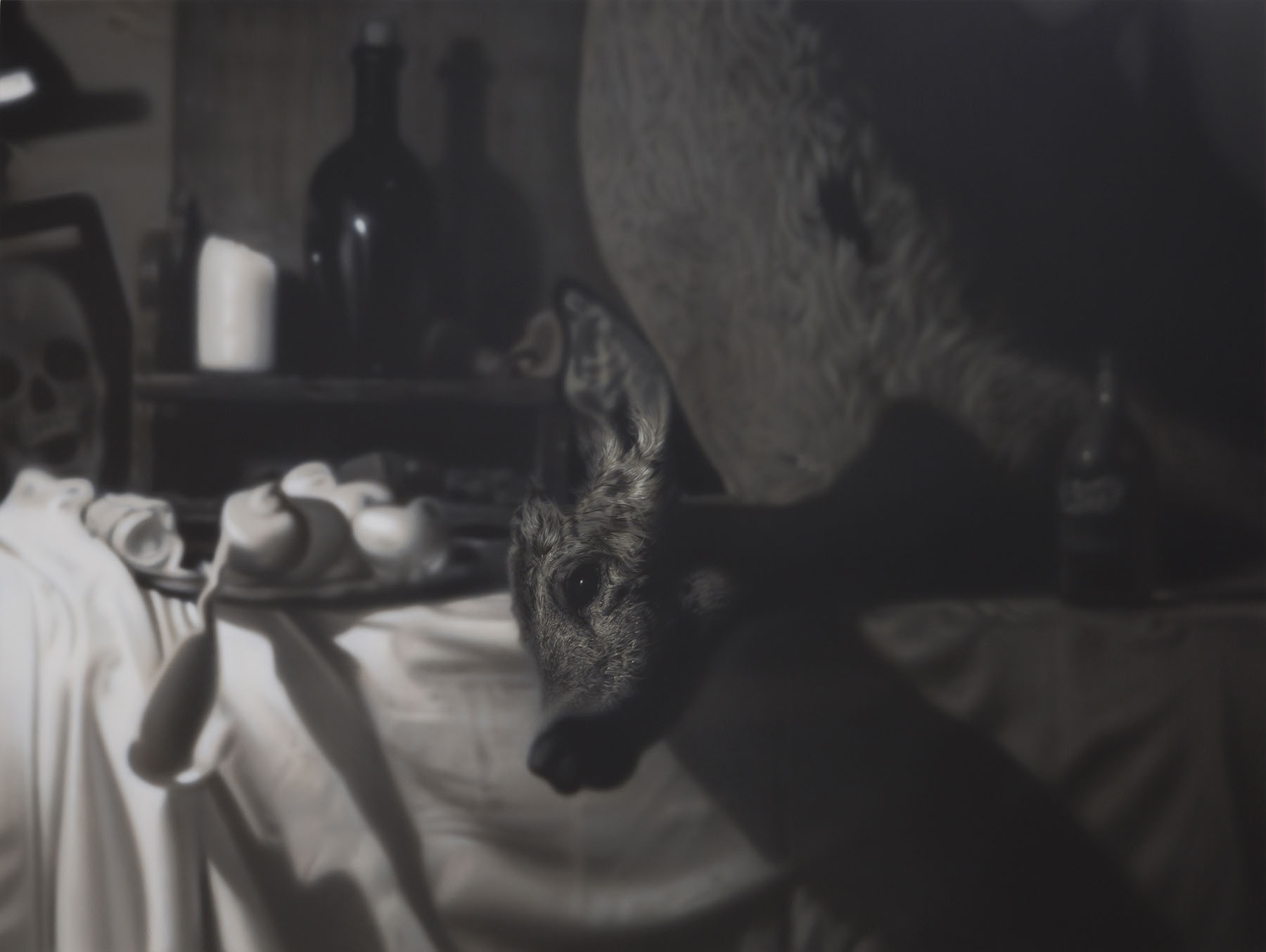
Every Minute You Are Closer to Death, 2013

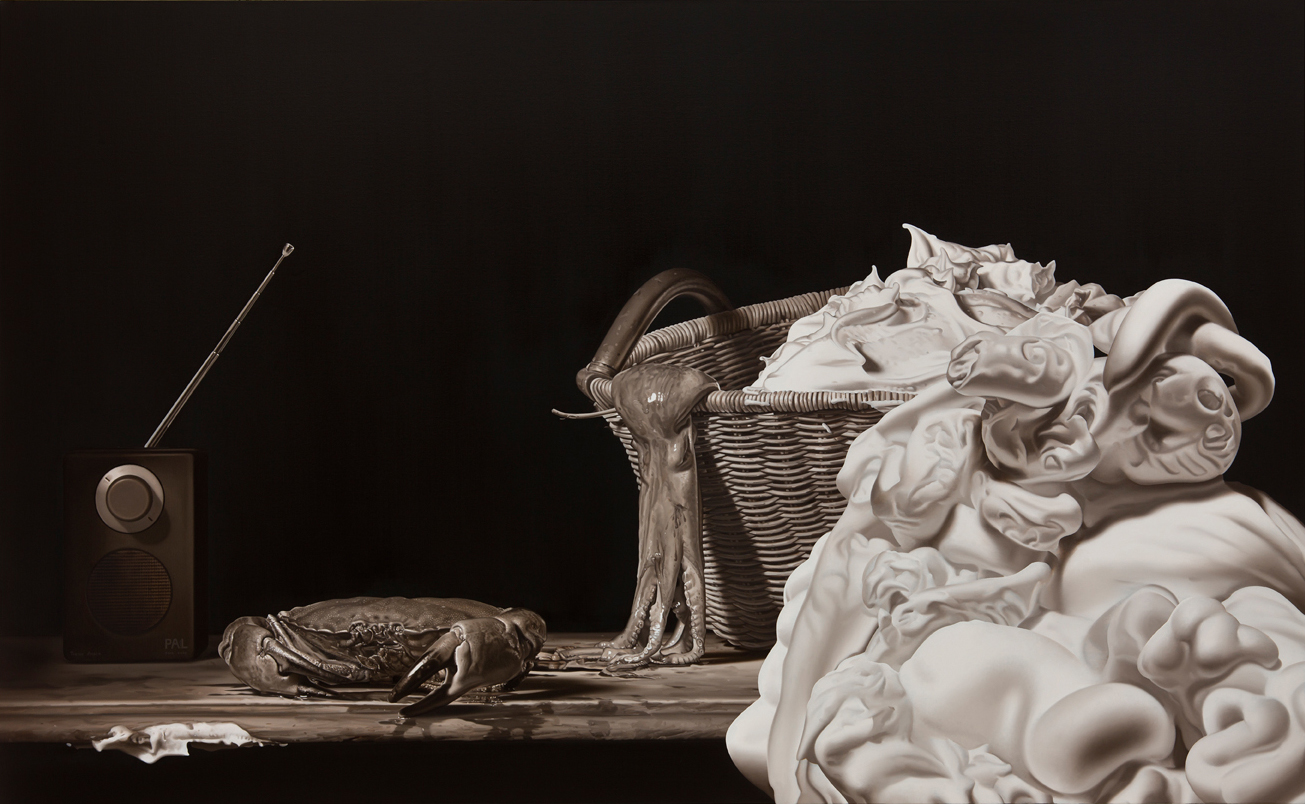
Experience Of Being Alive, 2014

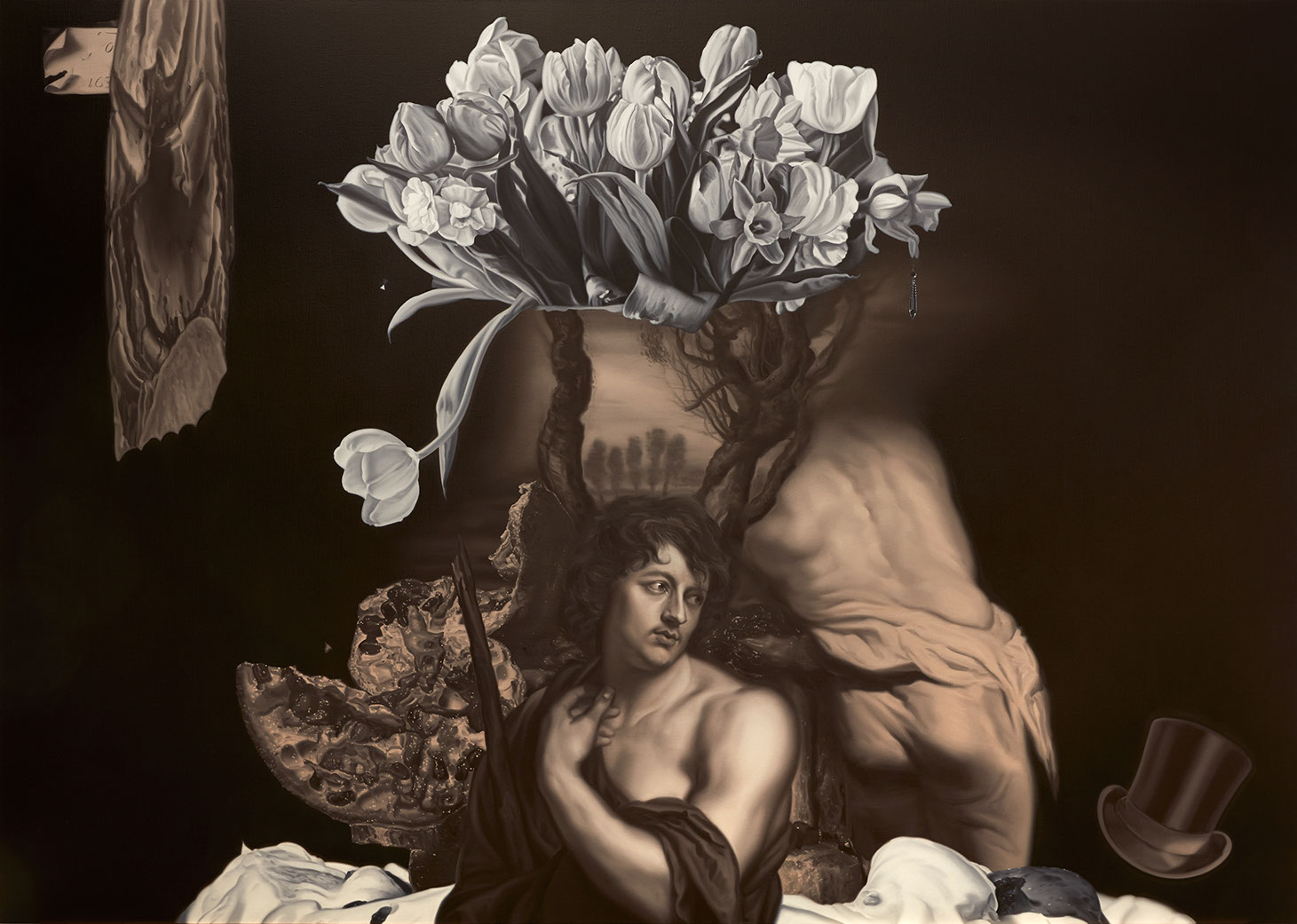
The Shepherd Paris, 2016

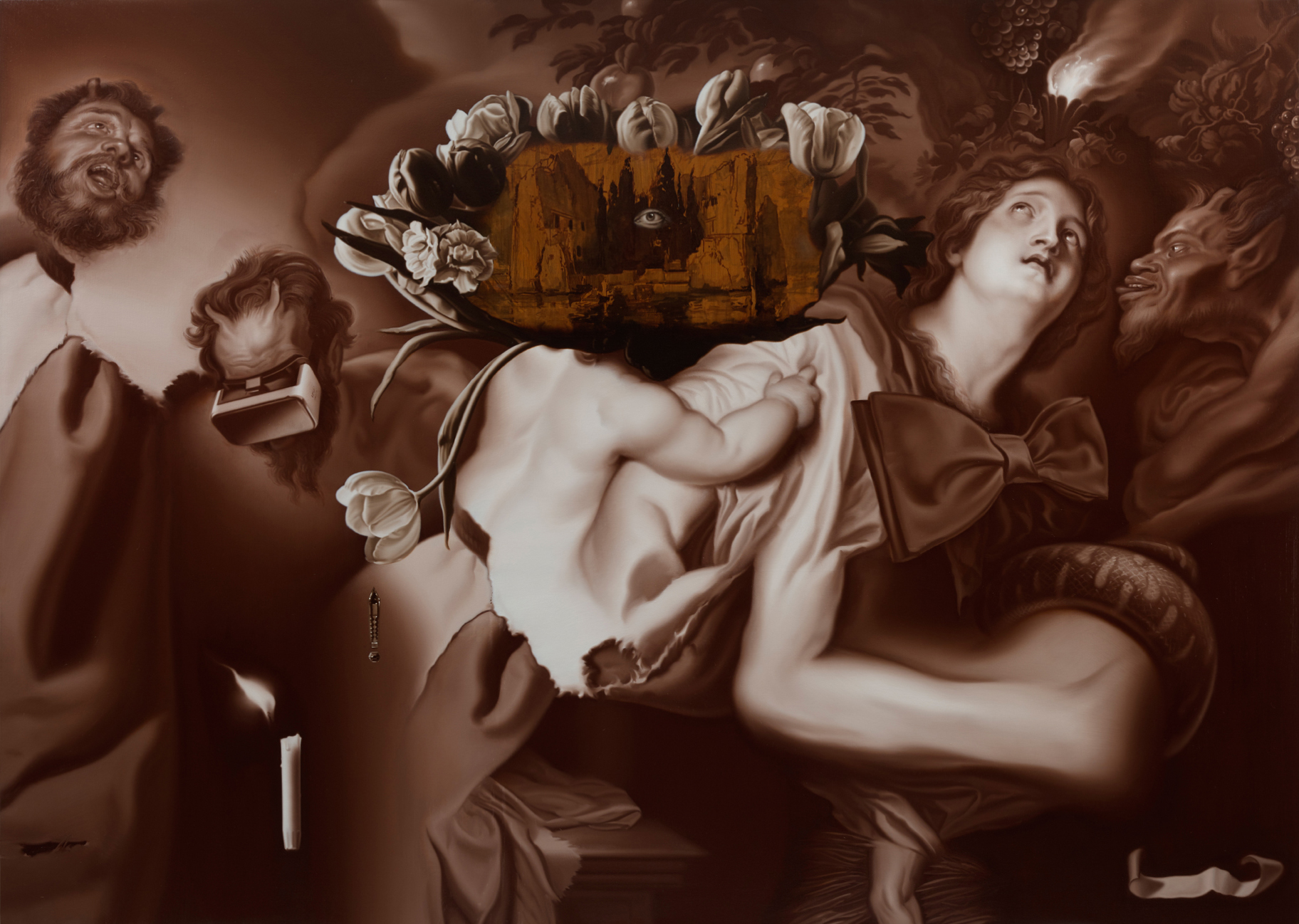
Circus of Nightmares, 2017

As part of fictional travelling in time Martinec made a journey to Iceland in 2016 and recorded his performance in a series of photographs. In his borrowed identity of the Baroque architect Kilian Ignaz Dientzenhofer searching for a place to build his futuristic church, Martinec created a story, which he later used as his motto for the Prague exhibition Voyage to Iceland in 2018. One year earlier he visited Iceland to paint the landscape (Idea of a Landscape, Reykjavík, 2015) and put a painting of a meditating Buddha under the open sky. A similar intervention in nature was done with the monochrome painting of Christ’s head after El Greco’s image from the National Gallery in Prague, which he placed in 2017 in Andalusia, Spain.

=== Projects ===
- 2005 Motol (Prague) – large project focused on the relationship of man to the public space of the Motol Hospital, five large-scale paintings, video installation (thesis at the Academy of Fine Arts; project was realised in Prague and is part of the collection of the National Gallery Prague).
- 2007 Cabling (Paris) – the whole project was understood as a meditative approach to capture energies and the past. In an imaginary space-time, Martinec used the effect of colourful strokes, lines typically characterised by focused blurred traces, Cabling works in its imaginary space-time.
- 2008 Lost in Time (London) – follow up of the Cabling project. The images reference masters of classical and contemporary painting with overlaps of current motifs.
- 2009 At The Same Time (London) – the paintings depict contemporary city scenes, empty spaces without people (supermarket, parking place, airports). The artist attempts to capture the cold industrial life in metropoles (London, Istanbul) and express solitude with hyperrealism exceeding to abstract geometrical shapes.
- 2012 Five Masters, Three Wardens and the Clerk (City of London) - polyptych of the officers of the Worshipful Company of Information Technologists commissioned by the Master Ken Olisa OBE
- 2017 El Greco is Watching, (long-term project), Spain
- 2018 Voyage to Iceland (London)
- 2018 Art Brussels, solo project, Parafin, Brussels
- 2019 The Everyday Archive, Brixton Beneficiary, London

=== Permanent Collections ===
- British Museum, London
- National Gallery in Prague
- Sammlung Grafling, Frankfurt/Wiesen
- Standard Chartered Bank, London
- WCIT Collection, London
- Asante Art Collection, Basel
- Robert Runtak Collection, Olomouc
- Omer Koc Collection, Istanbul
- Private collections in Vienna, Miami and New York

=== Solo shows ===
- 2000 Obrazy [Paintings], Ungula, antiquarian bookstore (Galerie Ungula), Prague
- 2005/2006 Zmizel [Lost], Galerie DO/OKA, Prague
- 2007 Czech Centre Gallery, Paris
- 2008 Lost in Time, Cosa Gallery, London
- 2009 At The Same Time, Cosa Gallery, London
- 2009 After Holiday 1986, Czech Centre Gallery, Sofia
- 2010 Lucky Man, Caroline Wiseman, London
- 2013 Every Minute You Are Closer To Death, Flowers Gallery, London
- 2014 Every Minute You Are Closer To Death, Parafin, London
- 2016 Hybrid, The Factory, London
- 2016 Thank You For Looking at Me, Iceland
- 2017 The Birth of Tragedies, Parafin Gallery, London
- 2018 El Greco is Watching, Spain
- 2018 Voyage to Iceland, Sternberg Palace, National Gallery Prague
- 2018 Kilian Ignaz D., Galerie Dům, Broumov
- 2019 The Everyday Archive, Brixton Beneficiary, London
- 2020 The Same for Everyone, Parafin Gallery, London

=== Group shows (selection) ===
- 1999/2000 Artist Autumn in Náchod. 16th edition of regional art display, Gallery of Fine Art in Náchod
- 2001 AVU Studios / School of Painting of professor Zdeněk Beran, Wortner House of Aleš Southbohemian Gallery, České Budějovice
- 2004 Cooper Union Gallery, New York
- 2005 Nudes in Action / Graduate Exhibition of the Studio of Classical Painting of prof. Zdeněk Beran, Šumava Museum, Kašperk Mountains, Galerie Diamant, Prague
- 2005 AVU Graduates 2005, Trade Fair Palace, Prague
- 2005 Prague Biennale, National Gallery Prague
- 2005 Gallery Foundation M + J Anderle, Prague
- 2005 Prague’s Studios, New Town Hall Gallery, Prague
- 2006 Still Lifes, Gallery of Modern Art in Hradec Králové
- 2006 BLACK Art Festival, Pardubice
- 2007 BP Portrait Award, National Portrait Gallery, London, Tyne & Wear Museums, Newcastle
- 2007 Members Exhibition of Mánes Association of Fine Artists L-O, Galerie Diamant, Prague
- 2007/2008 Collective Exhibition: 2008 Calendar, Galerie DO/OKA, Prague
- 2008 Defenestration: Graduate and Student Exhibition of AVU, Studio of prof. Zdeněk Beran, New Town Hall Gallery, Prague
- 2008 Transfer, White Box, Munich
- 2008 International Triennale of Contemporary Art, National Gallery Prague
- 2008 Re-Reading The Future, Project Mobility, National Gallery Prague
- 2009 Transfer, House of the Lords of Kunštát, Brno
- 2009 Prague Biennale 4 / Prague Biennale Photo 1, Karlín Hall, Prague
- 2009 BP Portrait Award, National Portrait Gallery, London, Southampton City Art Gallery, Southampton
- 2010 BP Portrait Award, Scottish National Gallery, Edinburgh
- 2010 Passion for Freedom, UNIT 24 Gallery, London
- 2010 Transfer, Czech National Building, New York
- 2011 Encoded Systems, Read Gate Gallery, London
- 2012 Beyond Reality: British Painting Today, Galerie Rudolfinum, Prague
- 2012 Ein Weisses Feld, Schlachthaus Aschaffenburg
- 2012 Coal and Steel, Candid Arts Trust Gallery, London, Czech Centre Gallery, Prague
- 2013 BP Portrait Award, National Portrait Gallery, London
- 2014 John Moores Painting Prize 2014 at the Walker Art Gallery, Liverpool, as part of the Liverpool Biennial
- 2015 Blow Up: Painting, Photography and Reality, Parafin, London
- 2016 YIA # 7 (Young International Artists) Paris, represented by ZAHORIAN & VAN ESPEN
- 2017 Arc of Memory, Zahorian & Van Espen, Prague
- 2017 Fascination with Reality: Hyperrealism in Czech Painting, Museum of Art Olomouc
- 2019 Vanité, Brixton Beneficiary, London
- 2019 In Living Memory, Emo Court in collaboration with OPW (Oliver Sears Gallery), Republic of Ireland
- 2020 The Same For Everyone, Parafin, London
- 2020 Inspiration - Iconic Works, Nationalmuseum Stockholm
- 2020 Inspiration - Iconic Works, Ateneum Art Museum, Finnish National Gallery, Helsinki
- 2020 COMPLEX STATES: Art in the years of Brexit, Gallery 46, London, International and virtual exhibition, Worldwide
- 2020/2021 Vanitas, Dox Centre for Contemporary Art, Prague
