= Liebert (surname) =

Libert is a surname. Notable people with the surname include:

- Clement Liebert (15th century), Franco-Flemish singer and composer
- Eduard von Liebert (1850–1934), Imperial German Army general
- Eugene R. Liebert (1866–1945), Milwaukee architect
- Heinz Liebert (born 1936), German chess player
- Joy Liebert (1914–1999), English cricketer
- Kathy Liebert (born 1967), American professional poker player
- Mary Ann Liebert, founder of Mary Ann Liebert, Inc., a publishing company
- Ottmar Liebert (born 1959), German-born composer and guitarist
- Ralph Liebert ((19181984), founder of Liebert (company)
- Reginaldus Liebert (15th century), French composer
- Ursula Liebert (1933–1998), German chess player
- Johan Liebert, fictional protagonist of the manga series Monster
