= Liepert =

Liepert is a German language surname. It is similar to the surname Lippert.

== List of people with the surname ==
- Beate G. Liepert, Canadian scientist
- Ron Liepert (born 1949), Canadian politician from Alberta

== See also ==
- Lippert
- Limpertsberg
- Liebertwolkwitz
- Liedertswil
- Liebert (company)
