= Broumov =

- Town
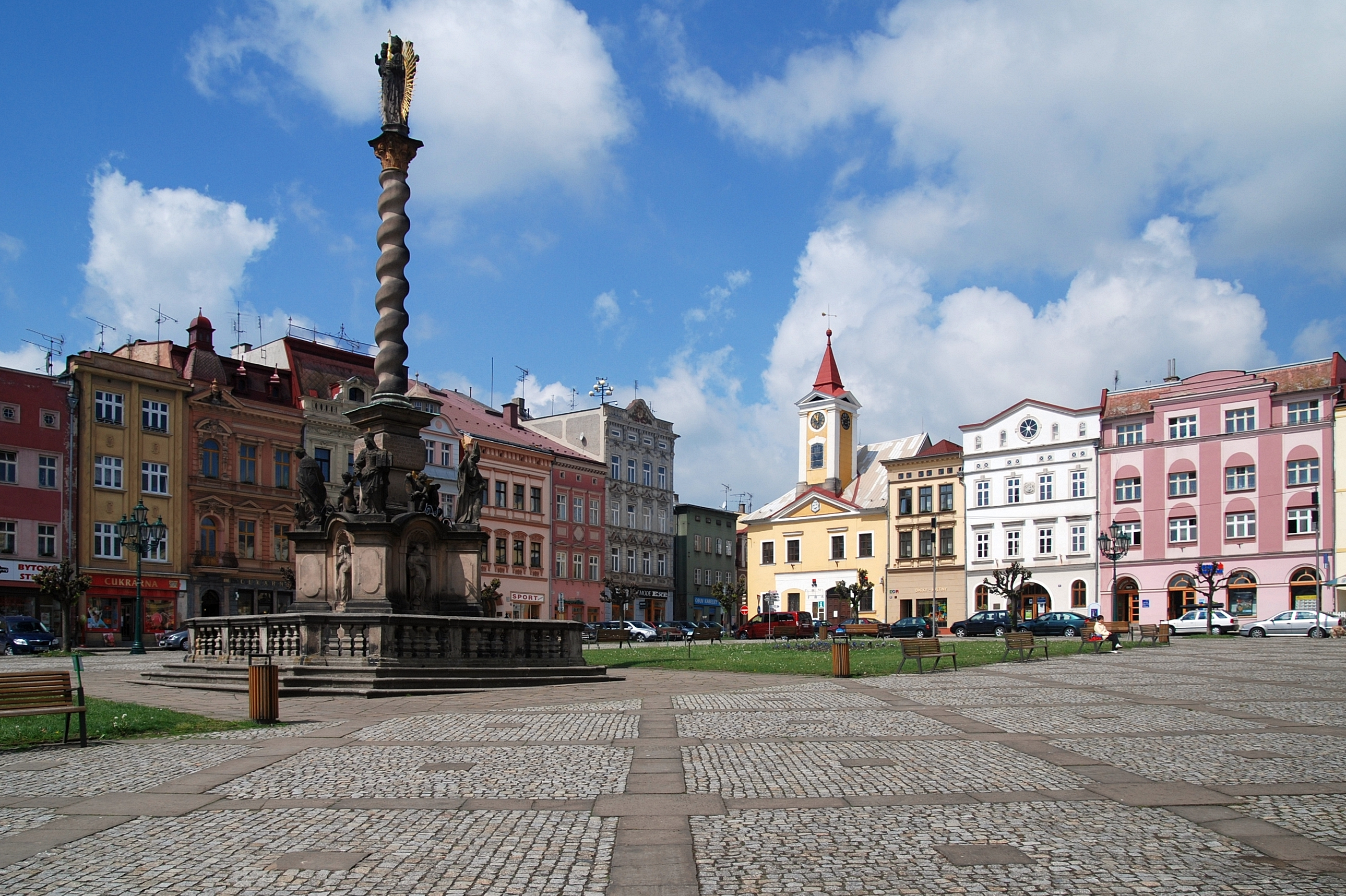
- The square Mírové náměstí with Marian Column

- Flag Coat of arms

- Location in the Czech Republic
- Coordinates: 50°35′8″N 16°19′55″E
- Country: Czech Republic
- Region: Hradec Králové
- District: Náchod
- First mentioned: 1256

Government
  - Mayor: Arnold Vodochodský

Area
  - Total: 22.28 km^{2} (8.60 sq mi)
- Elevation: 395 m (1,296 ft)

Population (2026-01-01)
  - Total: 6,998
  - Density: 314.1/km^{2} (813.5/sq mi)
- Time zone: UTC+1 (CET)
  - Summer (DST): UTC+2 (CEST)
- Postal code: 550 01
- Website: www.broumov-mesto.cz

Broumov (Czech pronunciation: [ˈbroumof]; German: Braunau) is a town in Náchod District in the Hradec Králové Region of the Czech Republic. It has about 7,000 inhabitants. The town is located on the Ścinawka River in the Broumov Highlands, near the border with Poland.

Broumov was probably founded in 1255. The tradition of textile production in Broumov arose in the 13th century and continues to this day. There are three important historic buildings, protected as national cultural monuments: the Benedictine monastery, the Church of the Virgin Mary and the Church of Saint Wenceslaus. The historic town centre is well preserved and is protected as an urban monument zone.

== Administrative division ==
Broumov consists of eight municipal parts (in brackets population according to the 2021 census):

- Broumov (2,072)
- Benešov (106)
- Kolonie 5. května (213)
- Nové Město (1,631)
- Olivětín (1,018)
- Poříčí (405)
- Rožmitál (162)
- Velká Ves (1,267)

== Etymology ==
The name is derived from the old Czech personal name Brum (also written as Brúm, Brun, Brún).

== Geography ==
Broumov is located about 22 kilometres (14 mi) northeast of Náchod and 19 km (12 mi) south of the Polish city of Wałbrzych. The municipal territory shortly borders Poland in the north. It lies in the Broumov Highlands. The highest point is the hill Bobří vrch at 740 m (2,430 ft) above sea level. The Ścinawka River flows through the town. The territory lies entirely in the Broumovsko Protected Landscape Area.

=== Climate ===
Broumov's climate is classified as humid continental climate (Köppen: Dfb; Trewartha: Dclo). Among them, the annual average temperature is 7.8 °C (46.0 °F), the hottest month in July is 17.8 °C (64.0 °F), and the coldest month is −1.6 °C (29.1 °F) in January. The annual precipitation is 638.1 millimetres (25.12 in), of which July is the wettest with 92.6 millimetres (3.65 in), while February is the driest with only 33.7 millimetres (1.33 in). The extreme temperature throughout the year ranged from −31.8 °C (−25.2 °F) on 27 January 1954 to 35.9 °C (96.6 °F) on 28 July 2013.

Climate data for Broumov, 1991–2020 normals, extremes 1902–present
Month	Jan	Feb	Mar	Apr	May	Jun	Jul	Aug	Sep	Oct	Nov	Dec	Year
Record high °C (°F)	15.5 (59.9)	17.7 (63.9)	22.0 (71.6)	28.5 (83.3)	31.7 (89.1)	34.4 (93.9)	35.9 (96.6)	35.5 (95.9)	33.9 (93.0)	26.1 (79.0)	19.7 (67.5)	15.0 (59.0)	35.9 (96.6)
Mean daily maximum °C (°F)	1.4 (34.5)	3.1 (37.6)	7.7 (45.9)	13.9 (57.0)	18.6 (65.5)	21.9 (71.4)	24.4 (75.9)	24.2 (75.6)	18.8 (65.8)	12.7 (54.9)	6.6 (43.9)	2.3 (36.1)	13.0 (55.4)
Daily mean °C (°F)	−1.6 (29.1)	−0.7 (30.7)	2.5 (36.5)	7.4 (45.3)	12.3 (54.1)	15.9 (60.6)	17.8 (64.0)	16.9 (62.4)	12.3 (54.1)	7.5 (45.5)	3.3 (37.9)	−0.4 (31.3)	7.8 (46.0)
Mean daily minimum °C (°F)	−4.9 (23.2)	−4.5 (23.9)	−2.0 (28.4)	1.2 (34.2)	5.6 (42.1)	9.4 (48.9)	11.2 (52.2)	10.5 (50.9)	6.8 (44.2)	3.2 (37.8)	0.0 (32.0)	−3.3 (26.1)	2.8 (37.0)
Record low °C (°F)	−31.8 (−25.2)	−29.6 (−21.3)	−25.2 (−13.4)	−15.0 (5.0)	−5.2 (22.6)	−1.9 (28.6)	1.3 (34.3)	0.7 (33.3)	−5.1 (22.8)	−8.8 (16.2)	−20.3 (−4.5)	−30.2 (−22.4)	−31.8 (−25.2)
Average precipitation mm (inches)	39.7 (1.56)	33.7 (1.33)	42.6 (1.68)	35.3 (1.39)	64.3 (2.53)	74.9 (2.95)	92.6 (3.65)	72.6 (2.86)	55.7 (2.19)	45.5 (1.79)	37.6 (1.48)	43.6 (1.72)	638.1 (25.12)
Average snowfall cm (inches)	16.9 (6.7)	18.4 (7.2)	9.8 (3.9)	1.7 (0.7)	0.0 (0.0)	0.0 (0.0)	0.0 (0.0)	0.0 (0.0)	0.0 (0.0)	0.3 (0.1)	6.7 (2.6)	15.2 (6.0)	68.9 (27.1)
Average relative humidity (%)	84.8	82.1	79.0	73.3	73.6	75.0	75.0	76.9	81.6	84.2	86.9	86.8	79.9
Mean monthly sunshine hours	37.0	63.6	122.4	183.3	201.9	202.2	215.4	207.8	151.8	95.7	44.1	32.5	1,557.8
Source: Czech Hydrometeorological Institute

== History ==
=== 13h–14th centuries ===
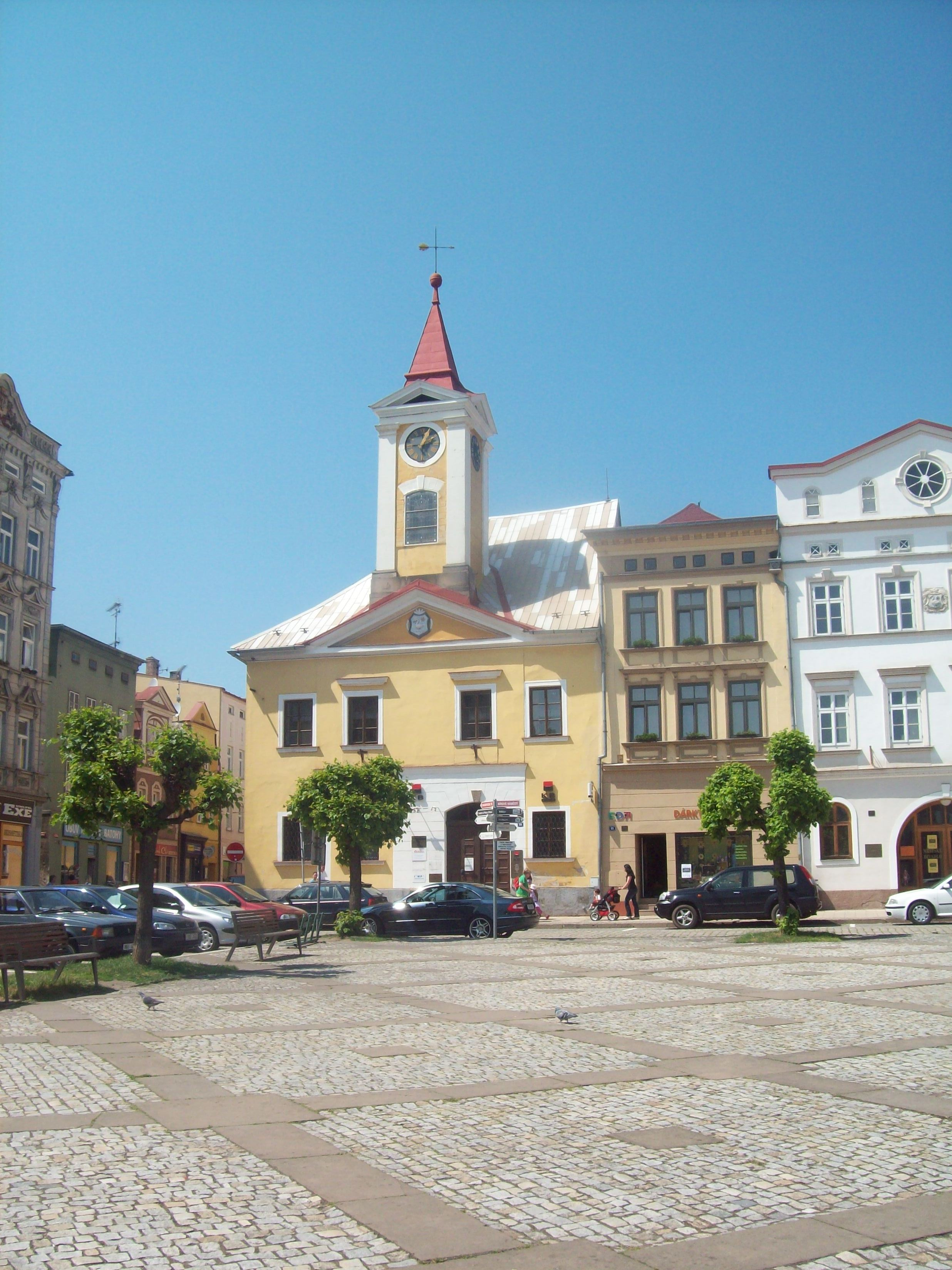
Town hall

In 1213, King Ottokar I had granted the remote area around today's Broumov and Police nad Metují to the Benedictine monks of Břevnov Monastery in Prague, who began to colonise the lands. The wooden Church of the Virgin Mary already stood here. Broumov was probably founded in 1255. The first written mention of Broumov is from 1256, when it was already referred to as a market village. It was a centre of trade, crafts and administration of the abbatial estates. In 1275, the drapers in Broumov received from King Ottokar II the privilege of producing and selling cloth, and the production soon began to be exported. This laid the foundation for the textile industry in the region.

Many fires broke out and destroyed the original buildings except for the Church of the Virgin Mary and damaged the local castle. In 1305 and following years, the castle was largely rebuilt and extended by one of the abbots into a fortified monastery complex with an abbey and Church of Saint Adalbert. The town became the administrative centre of the abbey's manors. In 1348, it received privileges by King Charles IV similar to royal towns. From 1357 to 1380, the town walls were built.

=== 15th–18th centuries ===
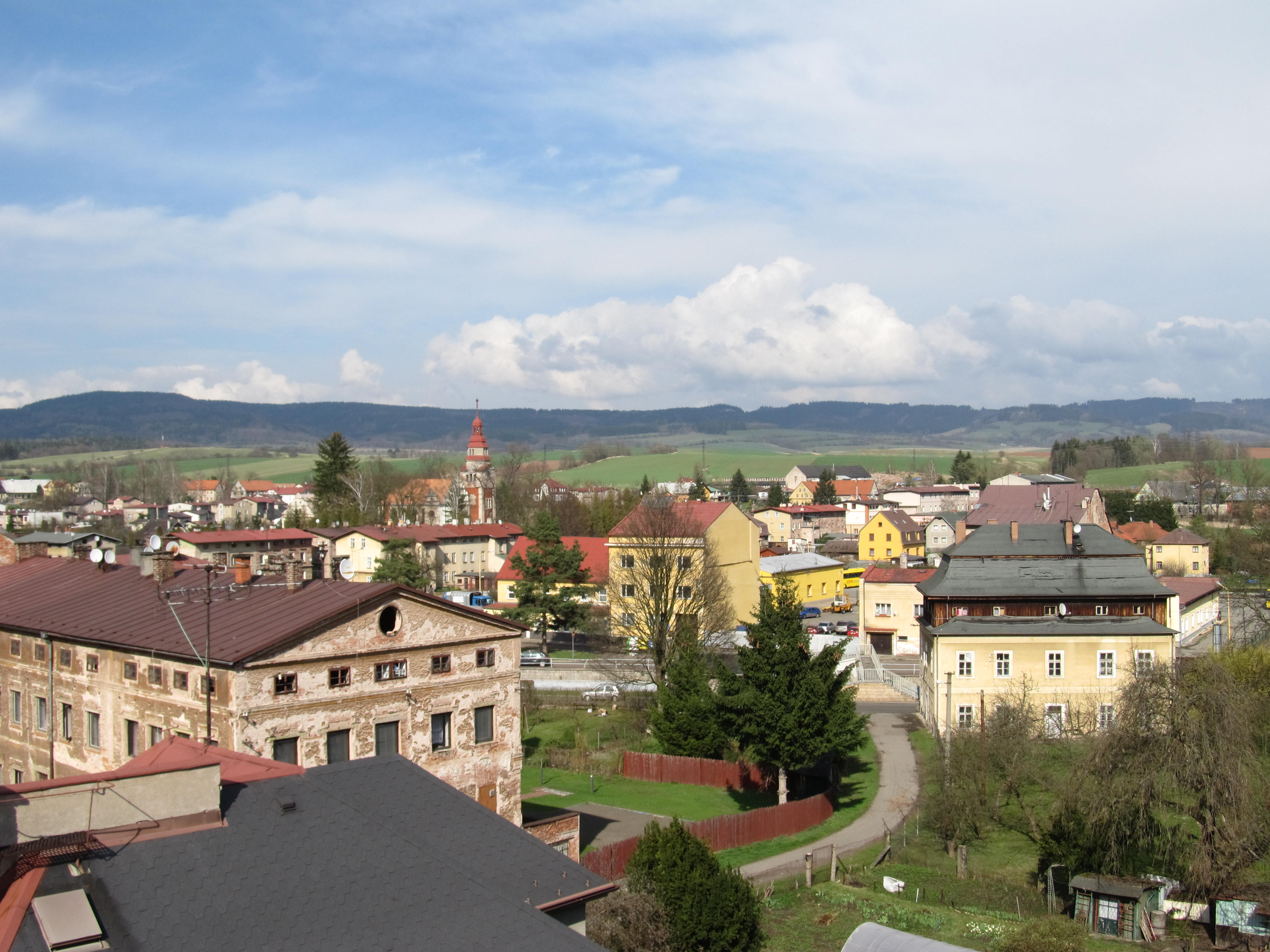
Eastern part of the town

The Broumov Monastery remained strongly tied to Břevnov Monastery, from where the monks fled during the Hussite Wars in 1420 to Broumov. The town was besieged by Hussites, but never conquered. However, it suffered losses and had to invest heavily in strengthening the walls. During the 15th century, Broumov was affected by war conflicts over the Bohemian throne. In the 16th century, the cloth production flourished and until the Thirty Years' War, the town was known as one of the biggest Bohemian producers and exporters of this article. Thanks to the wealth, it was possible to carry out renaissance repairs and build stone houses after the great fire in 1549.

It was incorporated into the Habsburg monarchy in 1526. During the Thirty Years' War, the town was damaged and looted several times. Thanks to good work of abbots between 1663 and 1738, the town recovered and reached economic prosperity. Broumov again suffered in the Silesian Wars from 1740 onwards, when troops of the Prussian Army plundered it and upon the 1742 Treaty of Breslau, the adjacent lands of Silesia and Kłodzko were cut off by the newly established Austro-Prussian border. The wars stopped most of the cloth manufactury.

=== 19th–20th centuries ===
With Bohemia, the town became part of the Austrian Empire in 1804 and Austria-Hungary in 1867. From 1868 it was the administrative seat of Braunau District, one of 94 districts in the Austrian Kingdom of Bohemia. After the Austro-Prussian War of 1866, more than 400 citizens emigrated to Latin America, especially to Chile, where the village of Nueva Braunau was established near Puerto Varas in 1875.

During the first half of the 19th century, the built-up area of the town stretched outside the town walls. In the late 19th century, the industrialisation started and new factories were established. Textile factories have become the mainstay of the economy.

In 1871–1874, more than 400 inhabitants of Broumov emigrated to Latin America and founded the village of Nueva Braunau in Chile in 1875.

Upon World War I and the dissolution of Austria-Hungary, Broumov with its predominantly German population became part of the new state of Czechoslovakia according to the 1919 Treaty of Saint-Germain. After the Munich Agreement, Broumov was occupied by Nazi Germany in October 1938 and incorporated into Reichsgau Sudetenland.

Pursuant to the Beneš decrees, the German-speaking population was expelled, including the monastery's monks, who re-established the Braunau in Rohr Abbey in Bavaria. The Broumov Monastery was finally abolished in 1950; after the Velvet Revolution of 1989, the premises were returned to the Benedictines.

== Demographics ==
Historical population

Year	Pop.	±%
1869	5,701	—
1880	7,592	+33.2%
1890	9,063	+19.4%
1900	10,555	+16.5%
1910	11,846	+12.2%

Year	Pop.	±%
1921	10,268	−13.3%
1930	10,931	+6.5%
1950	6,713	−38.6%
1961	7,680	+14.4%
1970	7,814	+1.7%

Year	Pop.	±%
1980	7,834	+0.3%
1991	8,076	+3.1%
2001	8,361	+3.5%
2011	7,615	−8.9%
2021	6,874	−9.7%

Source: Censuses

== Economy ==
The tradition of the textile industry continues to this day. The main employer in Broumov is the textile company Veba with more than 500 employees.

== Transport ==
Broumov is the starting point of the railway line Broumov–Starkoč via Náchod.

== Sights ==
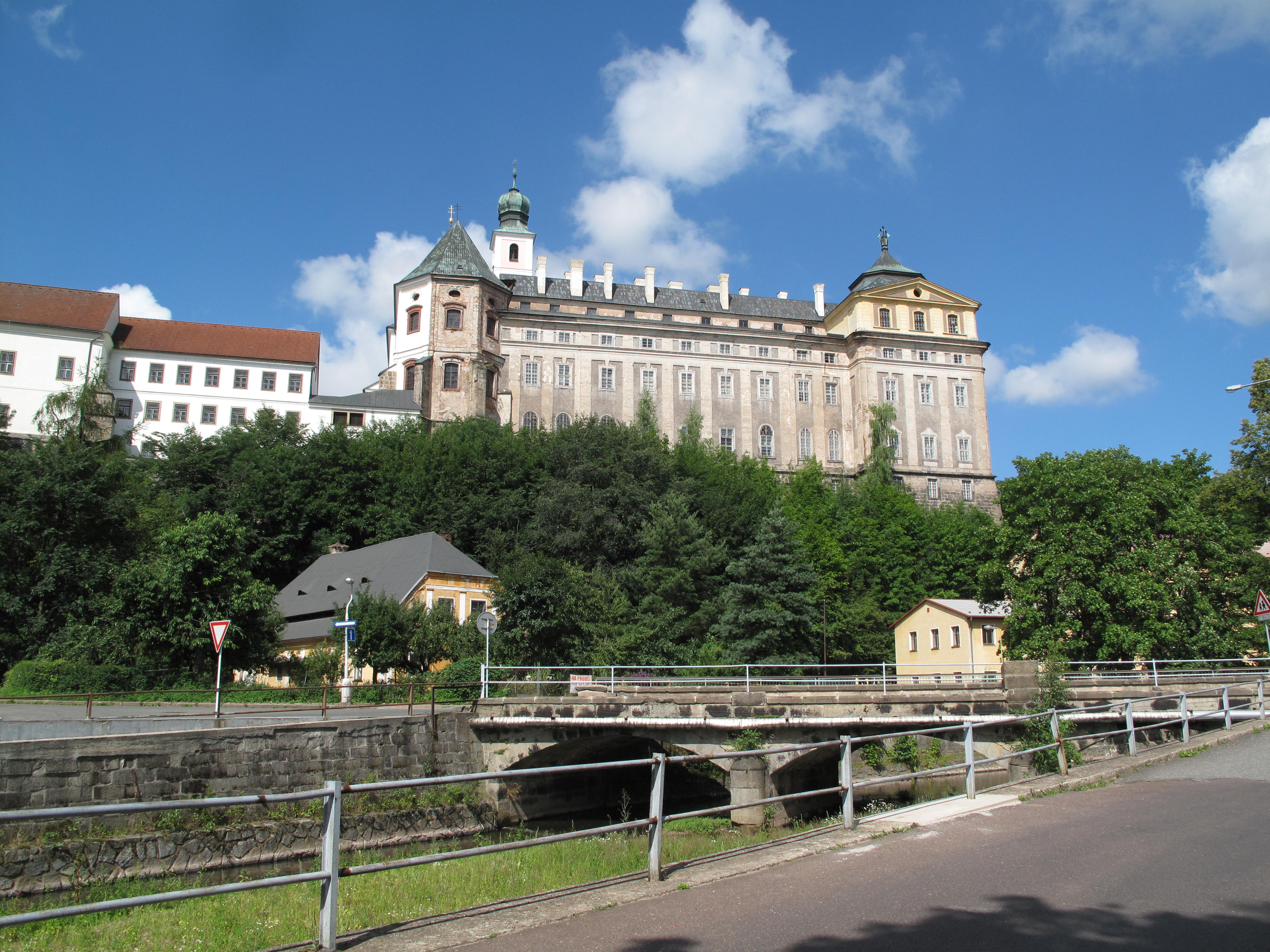
Broumov monastery

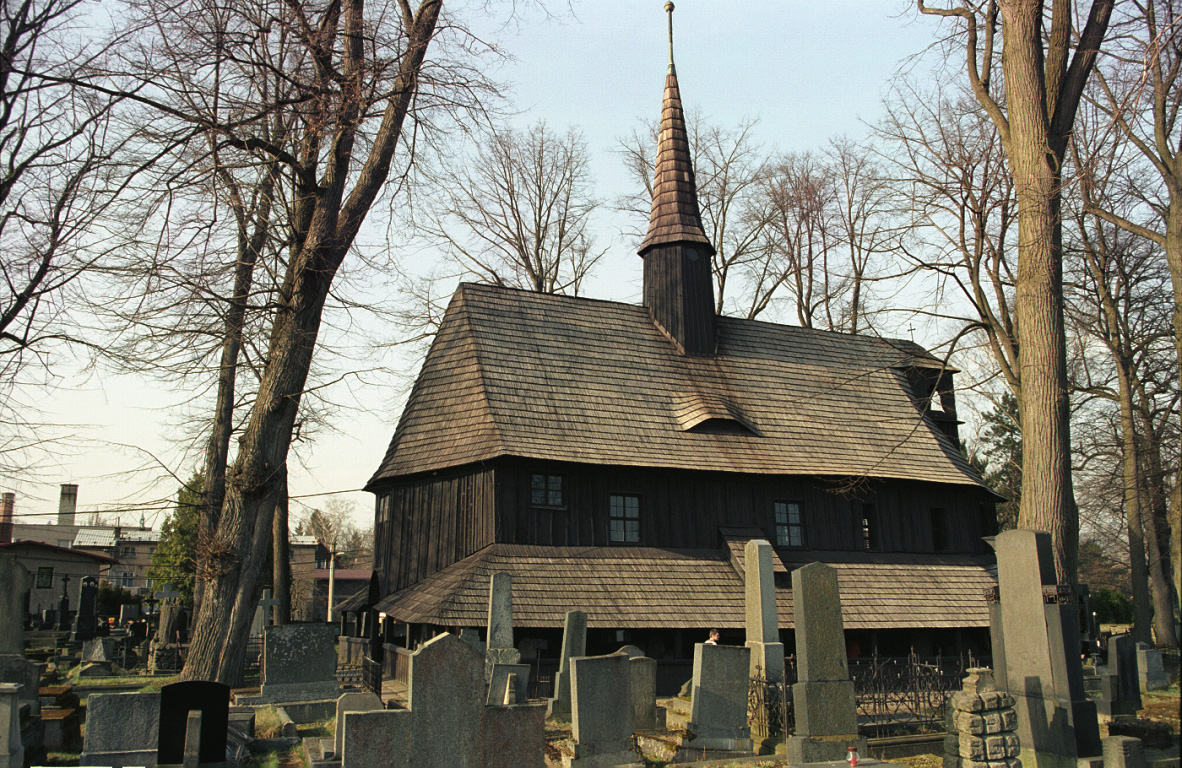
Wooden Church of the Virgin Mary

Broumov has preserved historical centre similar to Silesian towns with a large rectangular market square with two parallel main streets running from both sides of the square and converging at both gates located on the opposite sides of the town. Throughout the perimeter of the old town are preserved fragments of town walls. The town hall on the square was originally from the 13th century and one of the oldest in Bohemia. Its current appearance is a result of many reconstructions, the last are from 1839 and 1994. In the historic centre there are many valuable burghers' houses, originally in the Gothic style and rebuilt in 16th, 18th and 19th centuries.

The Benedictine Monastery of Saint Wenceslaus from the early 14th century was rebuilt in Baroque style to plans by Christoph Dientzenhofer, continued by his son, Kilian Ignaz Dientzenhofer in 1728–1738. Today the monastery houses the regional museum. The monastery garden is also accessible. The Church of Saint Adalbert in the monastery complex dates from 1357 and was baroque rebuilt in 1684–1694. For its value, the monastery is protected as a national cultural monument.

Besides the monastery church, there are four other significant churches in the town. The rarest is the wooden Church of the Virgin Mary, which is a national cultural monument. This cemetery church was founded at the latest in the early 13th century. It was rebuilt in 1450 or 1459 after it was burnt down by the Hussites, and repaired in 1779. It is one of the oldest wooden sacral buildings in central Europe. The church is exceptional not only for its age, but also for its construction technique. It does not contain any nails and is formed by half-timbered structure made of massive oak beams. It includes a gallery with Renaissance and Empire tombstones.

The Church of Saint Wenceslaus was built in 1728–1729 according to the design made by K. I. Dientzenhofer. It replaced an old wooden Protestant church, abolished in 1618. The church is the third building in the town protected as a national cultural monument.

The Church of Saint Peter and Paul was first mentioned in 1258. The church was replaced by a stone building in the 14th century and it rebuilt in Baroque style in 1679–1680. The tower was added in 1682.

The Church of the Holy Spirit was first mentioned in the 14th century. The originally wooden church was replaced in 1689 by the current stone building.

== Notable people ==
- Julius Lippert (1839–1909), historian
- Alois Jirásek (1851–1930), writer; attended school at Broumov Monastery
- Amadeus Webersinke (1920–2005), pianist
- Jiří Petr (1931–2014), agroscientist; attended school at Broumov
- Peter K. Vogt (born 1932), American molecular biologist and virologist
- Christian Feest (born 1945), ethnologist
- Pavel Krmaš (born 1980), footballer
- Hynek Martinec (born 1980), Czech-British painter
- Tomáš Pöpperle (born 1984), ice hockey player

== Twin towns – sister cities ==
Broumov is twinned with:

- Forchheim, Germany
- Nowa Ruda, Poland
