= Julius Lippert (historian) =

Austrian cultural historian (1839–1909)

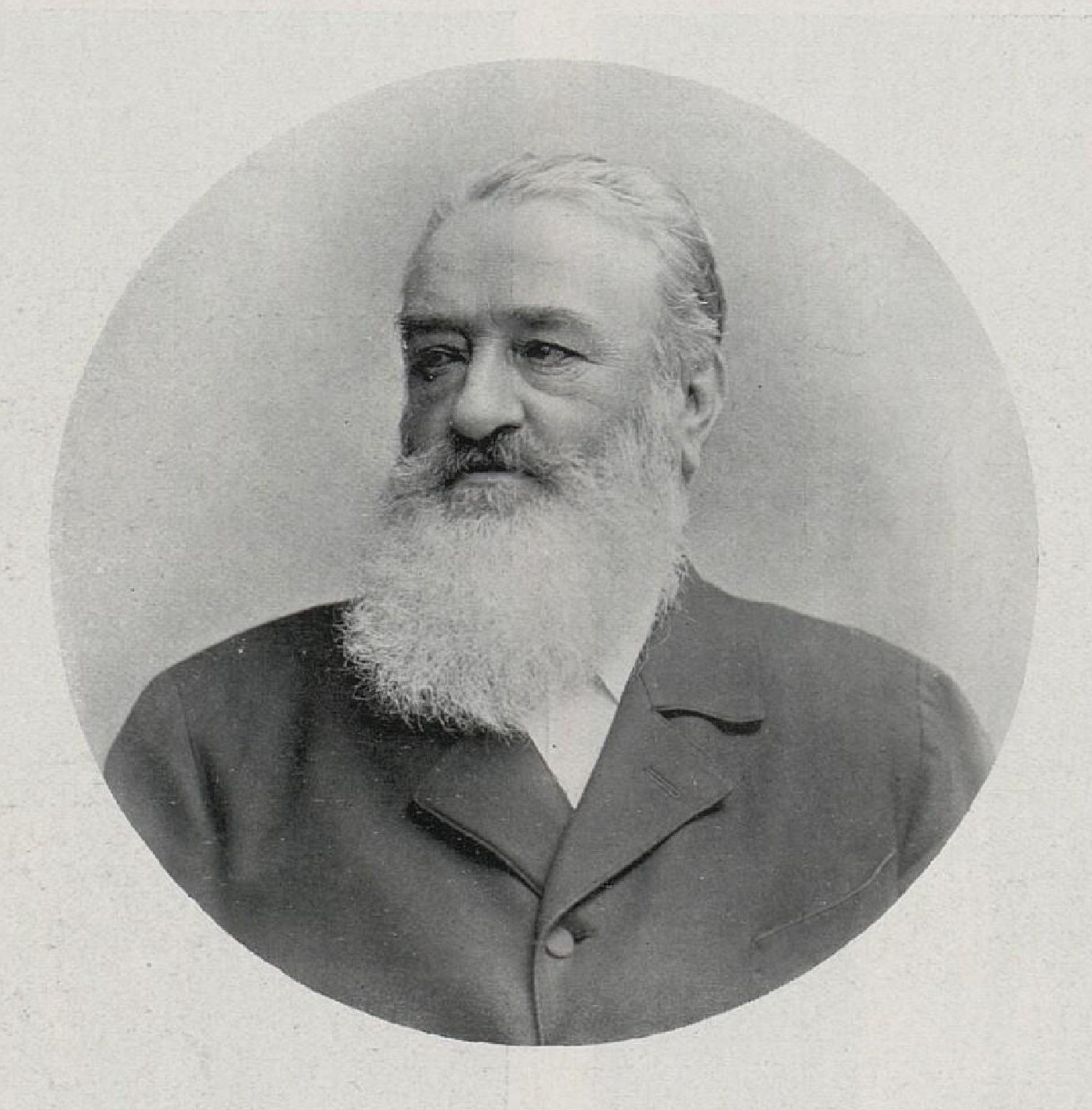
Julius Lippert (1839-1909).

Julius Lippert (12 April 1839 – 12 November 1909) was an Austrian cultural historian and politician in Bohemia.

Lippert was born in Braunau (Broumov) and died in Prague.

Lippert wrote a large number of works on religious and cultural history: Die Religionen der europäischen Kulturvölker etc. (1881), Geschichte der Familie (1885), Kulturgeschichte der Menschheit (2 vols., 1886-89), Deutsche Sittengeschichte (3 vols., 1889), Sozialgeschichte Böhmens in vorhussitischer Zeit (2 vols., 1895-98) med flera.

== Works ==
- Allgemeine Geschichte des Priestertums, 2 vols., 1883–1884
- Die Geschichte der Familie, 1884
- Kulturgeschichte der Menschheit in ihrem organischen Aufbau, 2 vols., 1886–1887
- Deutsche Sittengeschichte, 3 vols., 1889
- Sozialgeschichte Böhmens, 2 vols., 1896–1898
