= Reginaldus Libert =

French composer

Reginaldus Libert (Reginald; also Liebert) (fl. c. 1425–1435) was a French composer of the early Renaissance. He was a minor member of the Burgundian School, a contemporary of Guillaume Dufay, and one of the first to use fauxbourdon in a mass setting.

Little to nothing is known of his life. He may be the same as a Reginaldus who was employed at the cathedral in Cambrai as a singing teacher to the boys in 1424.

Four compositions by Libert have been identified. Two are rondeaux, which was the popular type of French chanson at the time. Both rondeaux are for three voices with only the uppermost voice being supplied with a text (instruments were often used for the other parts, especially in the music of the Burgundians).

His most famous composition is a complete setting of the mass, for three voices, which contains some of the earliest use of fauxbourdon. An unusual feature of this mass is that it contains music not only for the Ordinary (Kyrie, Gloria, Credo, Sanctus, Agnus Dei) but the Proper as well; in this regard it resembles the Missa Sancti Jacobi of Guillaume Dufay, which is often considered to be the earliest example of fauxbourdon to which the term was applied by the composer. Libert's mass uses a plainsong source which permeates all the movements, and migrates from voice to voice. Stylistically, this mass, as well as his other compositions, fit the period around 1430.

Libert also wrote a setting of the Kyrie for four voices. Both this Kyrie and the complete mass survive in the Trent Codices.
