= IEC 62325 =

Set of energy market communication standards

IEC 62325 is a set of standards related to deregulated energy market communications, based on the Common Information Model. IEC 62325 is a part of the International Electrotechnical Commission's (IEC) Technical Committee 57 (TC57) reference architecture for electric power systems, and is the responsibility of Working Group 16 (WG16).

== Standard documents ==
IEC 62325 consists of the following parts, detailed in separate IEC 62325 standard documents:

- IEC 62325-301: Common information model (CIM) extensions for markets
- IEC 62325-351: CIM European market model exchange profile
- IEC 62325-450: Profile and context modelling rules
- IEC 62325-451-1: Acknowledgement business process and contextual model for CIM European market
- IEC 62325-451-2: Scheduling business process and contextual model for CIM European market
- IEC 62325-451-3: Transmission capacity allocation business process and contextual models for European market
- IEC 62325-451-4: Settlement and reconciliation business process, contextual and assembly models for European market
- IEC 62325-451-5: Problem statement and status request business processes, contextual and assembly models for European market
- IEC 62325-451-6: Publication of information on market, contextual and assembly models for European style market
- IEC 62325-452: North American style market profiles
- IEC 62325-502: Profile of ebXML
- IEC 62325-503: Market data exchanges guidelines for the IEC 62325-351 profile
- IEC 62325-504: Utilization of web services for electronic data interchanges on the European energy market for electricity
- IEC 62325-550-2: Common dynamic data structures for North American style markets
- IEC 62325-552-1: Dynamic data structures for day ahead markets (DAM)

== See also ==
- IEC TC 57
- IEC 61968
- IEC 61970
