= David Farr (businessman) =

American business executive

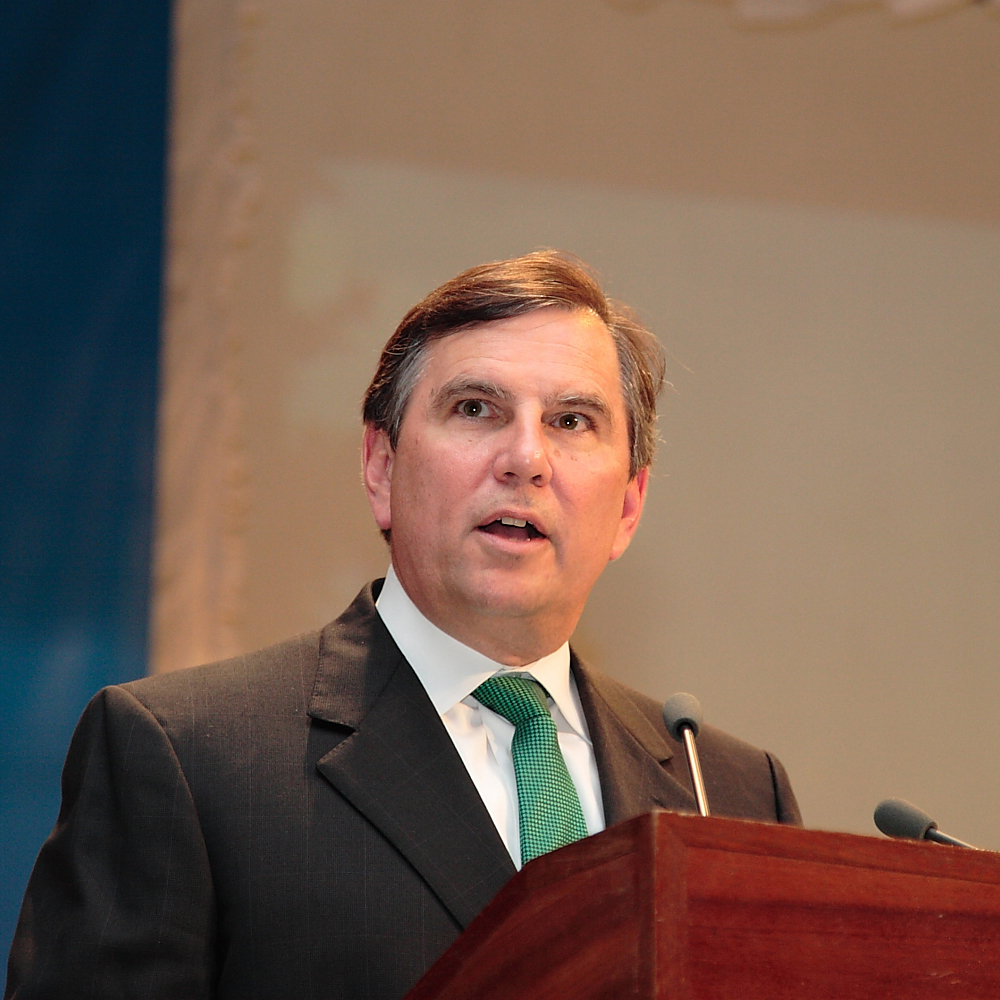
- Born: 1955 (age 70–71)
- Education: Wake Forest University (BS); Vanderbilt University (MBA)
- Employer(s): Chairman and former CEO of Emerson Electric Company

David Nelson Farr (born 1955) is an American business executive. He was the chairman and CEO of Emerson Electric Company, a Fortune 500 company. Farr has worked at the company since 1981 and retired as CEO on Feb 5, 2021. He is married to Lelia Far, with whom he has two children named Andrew and katies, and is a resident of St. Louis, Missouri.

On October 25, 2011, IBM announced Farr was elected to its board of directors, and he joined the board on January 1, 2012.

== Early life and education ==
Farr was born in the United States in 1955. He grew up in Corning, New York, where his father was a math teacher before becoming a plant manager at glassmaker Corning Inc. The job moved the family to England, where his mother died from a cerebral hemorrhage when Farr was 18. He went to Wake Forest University and graduated with a degree in chemistry in 1977. He went on to earn an MBA from the Owen Graduate School of Management at Vanderbilt University in 1981.

== Career ==
Farr began his career at Emerson in 1981. He held various positions upon his initial employment including manager of investor relations, vice president of corporate planning and development, president of the Ridge Tool division and group vice president for the industrial components and equipment business. He ascended the corporate ladder serving as president of Emerson Electric Asia-Pacific and then chief executive officer of Emerson's Astec joint venture Astec (BSR) PLC. He eventually became a senior executive vice president and chief operating officer in 1999. He was eventually named CEO in October 2000, succeeding Charles F. Knight who had held the position for the previous 27 years. Farr was only the third CEO in the company's history. Upon his retirement, he was succeeded by Surendralal "Lal" Karsanbhai, who was executive president of Emerson's largest business segment, Automation Solutions, from 2018 until being named CEO.

Additionally, Farr was elected chairman of the board of Emerson in 2004 and relinquished that position May 4, 2021. Farr currently serves on the board of directors for IBM, the Delphi Corporation, the United Way of Greater St. Louis and is a member of The Business Council.

During Farr's tenure, Emerson maintained its six-decade record of annual dividend increases, despite trade wars and a worldwide pandemic. Under Farr's leadership, the company became a $16.8 billion global corporation with some 200 factories and 85,000 employees, including about 1,400 at its headquarters in Ferguson, Missouri (a suburb of St. Louis). Farr aggressively moved Emerson production and design operations to low-cost, low-regulation environments outside the United States, particularly the People's Republic of China. Under Farr's leadership, Emerson laid off 14% of its U.S. workforce in 2009, eliminating nearly 20,000 jobs. While speaking at the Baird Industrial Outlook Conference in Chicago, in November 2009, Farr attacked the Obama administration for its attention to "labor rules" and "health reform", and stated: "What do you think I'm going to do? I'm not going to hire anyone in the United States. I'm moving." As a devotee of the St. Louis Cardinals baseball team, Farr was noted for swinging one five baseball bats he kept in his office to help him concentrate. He also used them to prod Emerson executives to speak during earnings calls.

=== Compensation ===
While CEO of Emerson Electric in 2009, David N. Farr earned a total compensation of $6,899,987, which included a base salary of $1,168,750, a cash bonus of $1,500,000, stock grants of $3,735,000, and other compensation totaling $496,237.

== Awards and recognition ==
Farr was the 2007 campaign chair for the United Way of Greater St. Louis, leading the community to raise a record-breaking $68.8 million to help people in the 16-county region of metro St. Louis. He was also named one of the Top 25 Managers in 2000. Emerson has been awarded as well under Farr's management having been named one of the 100 Best Corporate Citizens in 2004. Institutional Investor magazine named David Farr, CEO of Emerson EMR, one of The Best CEOs in America in the electrical equipment and multi-industry in 2008.

== Personal life ==
Farr is married with two children and is a resident of Ladue, Missouri.
