= IRAP =

IRAP may refer to:

- The International Refugee Assistance Project
- The International Road Assessment Programme
- The Institut de Recherche en Astrophysique et Planétologie
- The Implicit Relational Assessment Procedure, a computer-based psychological measure
- Interleukin 1 receptor antagonist, a protein
- IRAP PhD Program, an international joint doctorate program in relativistic astrophysics
- IRAP RMS Suite, a software suite for geomodelling and designing reservoirs
- Insulin responsive aminopeptidase, an alias for Leucyl/cystinyl aminopeptidase
