= Sven-Christian Kindler =

German politician (born 1985)

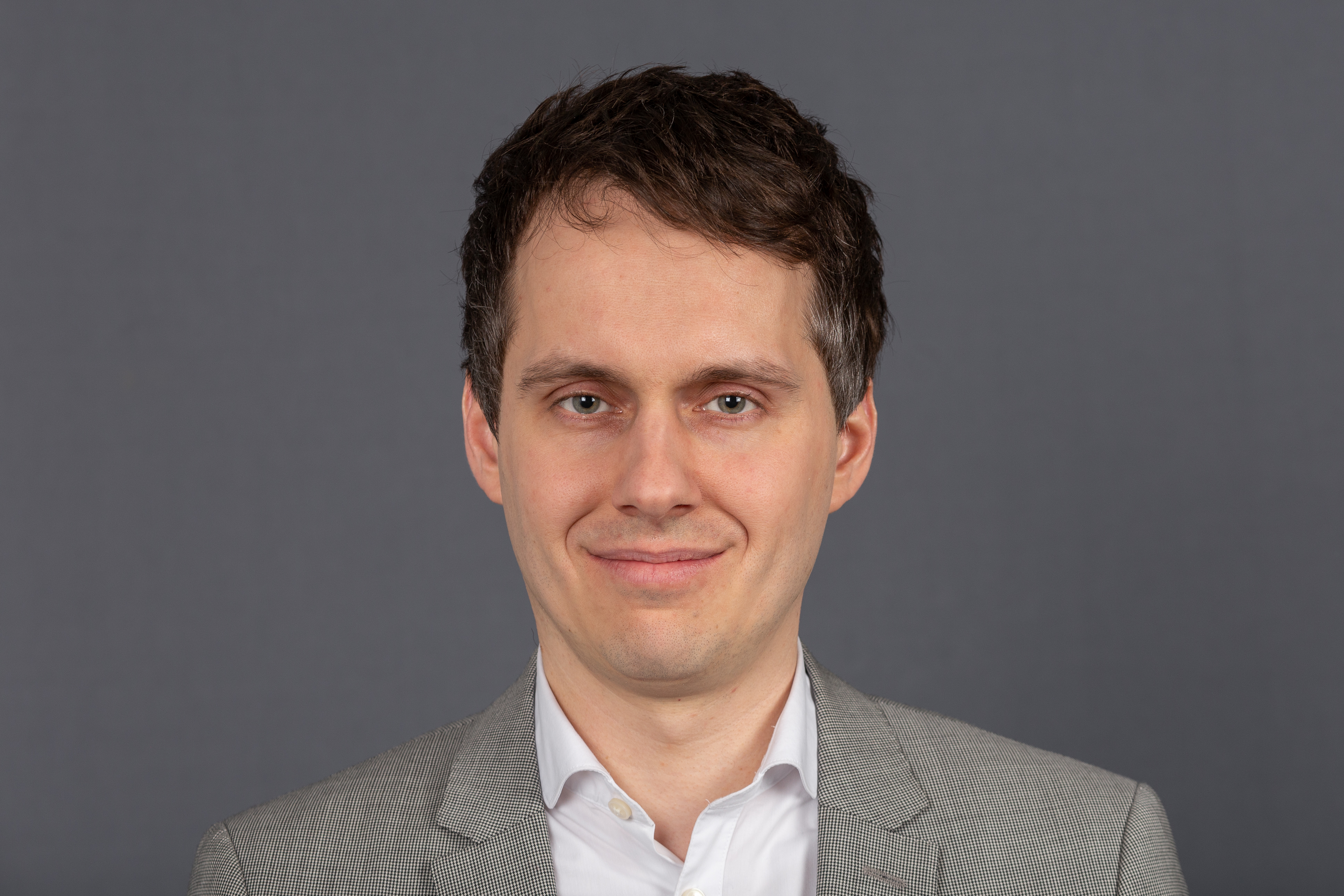
- Sven-Christian Kindler in 2020

Member of the Bundestag
- In office 2009–2025

Personal details
- Born: 14 February 1985 (age 41) Hannover, West Germany
- Party: Greens

Sven-Christian Kindler (born 14 February 1985) is a German politician of Alliance 90/The Greens who served as a member of the Bundestag from the state of Lower Saxony from 2009 to 2025.

== Early life and career ==
After graduating from high school in 2004 at the Käthe-Kollwitz-Schule (Hanover), Kindler completed a dual degree program of business administration at the Leibniz-Akademie Hanover and at Bosch Rexroth Pneumatics, which he completed in 2007 with a bachelor's degree in business administration. The training included an internship in Stockholm. From 2007 to 2009 he worked in corporate controlling at Bosch Rexroth Pneumatics.

== Political career ==
Kindler first became a member of the Bundestag in the 2009 German federal election. In parliament, he was a member of the Budget Committee; in 2018, he also joined its Sub-Committee on European Affairs. In this capacity, he was his parliamentary group's rapporteur on the annual budget of the Federal Ministry of Transport and Digital Infrastructure and the Federal Ministry of the Environment, Nature Conservation and Nuclear Safety, among others. From 2022, he was also a member of the so-called Confidential Committee (Vertrauensgremium) of the Budget Committee, which provides budgetary supervision for Germany's three intelligence services, BND, BfV and MAD. Within his parliamentary group, he serves as spokesman on budget policy.

In addition to his committee assignments, Kindler was part of the German-Israeli Parliamentary Friendship Group (since 2009) and the German-Iranian Parliamentary Friendship Group (since 2018).

Ahead of the 2021 elections, Kindler was elected to lead the Green Party's campaign in Lower Saxony, alongside Filiz Polat. In the negotiations to form a so-called traffic light coalition of the Social Democratic Party (SPD), the Green Party and the Free Democratic Party (FDP) following the elections, he was part of his party's delegation in the working group on financial regulation and the national budget, co-chaired by Doris Ahnen, Lisa Paus and Christian Dürr.

In April 2024, Kindler announced that he would not stand in the 2025 federal elections but instead resign from active politics by the end of the parliamentary term.

== Other activities ==
- Foundation "Remembrance, Responsibility and Future", Alternate Member of the Board of Trustees (since 2015)
- Institut Solidarische Moderne (ISM), Member of the Board of Trustees
- German Federation for the Environment and Nature Conservation (BUND), Member
- IG Metall, Member
- Pro Asyl, Member
- German Foundation for World Population (DSW), Member of the Parliamentary Advisory Board (–2021)
