= Open Systems International =

International technology company

OSI
- Company type: Private
- Industry: Utility Automation
- Founded: 1992
- Headquarters: Medina, Minnesota
- Area served: Worldwide
- Key people: Bahman Hoveida; President & CEO
- Number of employees: 1000 (2020)

Automatic Systems International, Inc. (ASI), or Open Systems International (OSI) is an automation software company headquartered in Medina, Minnesota, with international offices in Canada, Colombia, Spain, India, Dubai, Australia, Singapore, and China. Founded in 1992, the company was purchased by Emerson in 2020. The company's systems are used for the real-time management and optimization of production, transport, and delivery networks for utilities in the electric, oil and gas, transportation, and water industries. The company's core real-time OT platform has been successfully implemented at more than 550 installations worldwide.

== History ==
OSI was founded in May 1992 by Bahman Hoveida and Ron Ingram.

In 2009, OSI began construction of a $20 million eco-friendly corporate headquarters building in Medina, MN. The building was awarded the U.S. Green Building Council's LEED GOLD certification.

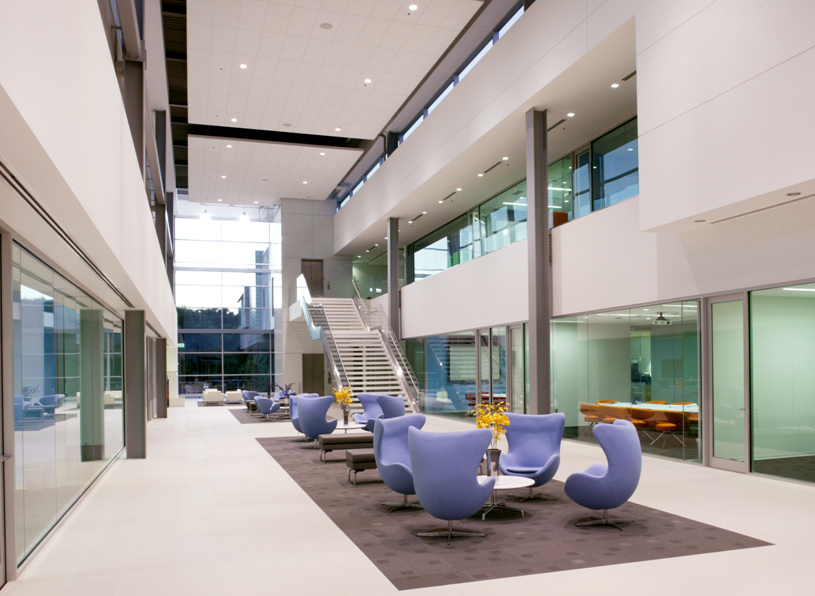
The central atrium of Open System's International's headquarters in Medina, Minnesota.

In 2015 and 2016, OSI made Inc. 5000's list of fastest-growing companies in America after experiencing 73 percent growth, with total revenue of $62.9 million.

In 2020, Emerson Electric Company announced an arrangement to purchase Open Systems International for $1.6 billion.

== Products ==
OSI maintains many energy software products, including the first productized and modular automation and applications platform based on an IT enterprise applications paradigm; the first Intel-based energy management system based on the Microsoft Windows platform in the 1990s, then the first platform on Linux in the early 2000s; the first totally independent multi-platform automation architecture capable of running on any prominent hardware, operating system, or relational database; the first comprehensive advanced user interface and situational awareness system for transmission, distribution, and generation operators; the first Linux-based secure remote terminal unit; the first advanced intelligent alarming system in the mid-2000s; and the adoption of big data technology and no-SQL database technologies to bring to market the industry's first big data historian.

Today, OSI provides open automation, network management and optimization products worldwide. The company offers supervisory control and data acquisition (SCADA) systems, energy management systems (EMS), generation management systems (GMS), distribution management systems (DMS), substation automation systems (SAS), data warehousing (historian) analytics, distributed energy resource management systems (DERMS), situational awareness systems, pipeline network management systems (NMS) and individual software and hardware products for utility operations. It also offers a cloud architecture serving SCADA, EMS, GMS, DMS and other smart-grid products such as demand response, renewables management, volt/VAR control and asset monitoring applications. OSI systems manage nearly 20 percent of the world's energy supply, transport and delivery.

== See also ==
- Energy management system
- SCADA
- Remote terminal unit
- Distribution management system
