= IRAP RMS Suite =

Roxar RMS
- RMS 2009 running on Windows XP.
- Original author(s): Geomatic AS
- Developer(s): Roxar AS
- Initial release: 1987
- Stable release: 11.1 / July 16, 2019; 6 years ago
- Operating system: Microsoft Windows; Linux (RHEL)
- Platform: Cross-platform
- Type: Computer-aided engineering
- License: Proprietary
- Website: www.roxarsoftware.com

Roxar RMS is a reservoir characterization and modeling software suite. It is primarily designed for use in the oil and gas industry, helping engineers gather data from a wide variety of sources to efficiently build reliable reservoirs.

== History ==
- 1987 - Geomatic begins distribution of the first version of the IRAP software.
- 1994 - IRAP becomes IRAP RMS, the industry’s first 3D modelling package.
- 1995 - Smedvig Technologies, later known as Roxar AS, acquires Geomatic AS and ODIN Reservoir Software. Smedvig’s analysis and processing software, ResView, ODIN's tool for stochastic reservoir modelling, STORM, and Geomatic's IRAP reservoir modelling software merge into IRAP RMS, later renamed to Roxar RMS.
- 2009 - Roxar is acquired by Emerson, St.Louis USA and becomes part of a USD 28 billion company.

== Versions ==
=== RMS 6 ===
In RMS 6.0, STORM’s stochastic modelling was merged with structure and fault modelling capabilities. Also introduced was the 'Workflow Manager' tool, which allows users to build and update reservoir models quickly.

=== RMS 7 ===
RMS 7.0 was the first RMS version to have native Windows compatibility.

==== New modules in RMS 7 ====
Module	Description
RMSwellplan	A user friendly oil well planning tool.
RMSflowsim	A flow simulator that integrates dynamic reservoir data with the static model.
RMSwellstrat	A well correlation tool.
RMSfaultseal	A module designed to analyse and provide data on the optimal ways to seal faults.
FracPerm	A fracture modeller/simulator.

=== RMS 8 ===
RMS 8.0 was released in November 2006.

=== RMS 9 ===
RMS 9.0 was released on 17 October 2007.

=== RMS 2009 ===
RMS 2009, released on 4 February 2009, had a new user interface. Other key features of the release included improved structural modelling, data import and a new local model update module. It also introduced real-time well monitoring.

=== RMS 2010 ===
RMS 2010 was released in February 2010. RMS 2010 included major improvements across the entire workflow, with a wide-ranging makeover of the well correlation tools, new model building and property modelling tools and improved 3D gridding and better communication with external simulators.

=== RMS 2011 ===
RMS 2011 was released in May 2011. RMS 2011 included more new features than any previous RMS version and provided modellers with enhancements to the seismic architecture to allow direct reference between the reservoir models and the 3D and 4D seismic data that the interpretation and modelling is based on. Key highlights of RMS 2011 included new tools to model complex geologies and incorporate 4D seismic into the workflow; geological well correlation improvements; new fracture modelling capabilities; and usability and integration features that made RMS 2011 even more accessible and easy to use, while at the same time realistically modelling some of the world’s most complex geologies.

=== RMS 2012 ===
RMS 2012 was released in March 2012 and came with new seismic inversion, seismic attributes, and field planning capabilities to help operators generate more accurate and realistic reservoir models and increase recovery rates. It was the last RMS version to support both 32-bit and 64-bit platforms.

=== RMS 2013 ===
RMS 2013 was released on 26 November 2013 for 64-bit Windows and Linux platforms. It came with model driven interpretation capabilities and new solutions for seismic interpretation, tightly linked to geological model building, providing users with a full seismic to simulation workflow. It also included a new tool to support structural uncertainty workflows, as well as new upscaling tools where transmissibility calculations and fault seal modelling can be performed using the geo model instead of the traditional approach based on the flow model.

=== RMS 2013.1 ===
RMS 2013.1 was released on 3 June 2015. It included improvements in uncertainty management, greater support for larger models, faster modeling and enhanced interoperability with other applications.

=== RMS 10 ===
RMS 10 was released on 2 December 2016. It provided significant improvements in seismic interpretation, structural and property modeling and reservoir engineering as well as further automation supporting Big Loop for reliable production forecasting. It also included Roxar API, a new extensibility and interoperability solution based on Python.

=== RMS 10.1 ===
RMS 10.1 was released on 2 June 2017.

== See also ==
- Petrel (reservoir software)
