= Common Information Model (electricity) =

Electrical power standard

The Common Information Model (CIM) is an electric power transmission and distribution standard developed by the electric power industry. It aims to allow application software to exchange information about an electrical network. It has been officially adopted by the International Electrotechnical Commission (IEC).

The CIM is currently maintained as a UML model. It defines a common vocabulary and basic ontology. CIM models the network itself using the 'wires model'. It describes the basic components used to transport electricity. Measurements of power are modeled by another class. These measurements support the management of power flow at the transmission level, and by extension, the modeling of power through a revenue meter on the distribution network. The CIM can be used to derive 'design artifacts' (e.g. XML or RDF Schemas) as needed for the integration of related application software.

CIM is also used to derive messages for the wholesale energy market with the framework for energy market communications, IEC 62325. The European style market profile is a profile derivation based on the CIM, intending to harmonize energy market data exchanges in Europe. ENTSO-E is a major contributor to the European style market profile.

The core packages of the CIM are defined in IEC 61970-301, with a focus on the needs of electricity transmission, where related applications include energy management system, SCADA, and planning and optimization. IEC 61970-501 and 61970-452 define an XML format for network model exchanges using RDF. The IEC 61968 series of standards extend CIM to meet the needs of electrical distribution, where related applications include distribution management system, outage management system, planning, metering, work management, geographic information system, asset management, customer information systems and enterprise resource planning.

As of December 2024, there are proposals to extend CIM to cover reticulated gas networks.

== CIM vs SCL ==
CIM and Substation Configuration Language (SCL) are developed in parallel under different IEC TC 57 working groups. Though both have the ability to exchange model and configuration information between different equipment or tools and use XML for storage, many differences separate the standards:

- CIM is based on UML, using inheritance. SCL representation is sequential or hierarchical.
- Although CIM is not limited to modeling equipment, CIM emphasises inheritance and its interconnection, whereas SCL starts from a functional point of view.
- CIM is broadly applied to enterprise integration and related information exchanges between systems including EMS, DMS, Planning, Energy Markets and while SCL is limited to the exchange of data within substation equipment and tools.

== Harmonization ==
Applications may use these standards to improve interoperability and data exchange by transforming SCL models into CIM models. Without harmonization, system and application development and implementation require engineering and design that applies to only one implementation. Harmonization can be done by mixing the equipment topological approach of CIM and the functionality approach of SCL. IEC TC 57 WG19 is involved in the harmonization CIM & SCL. This involves:

- Mapping of logical nodes of IEC 61850 (SCL) to equipment defined in CIM.
- Use Web Ontology Language to define the mapping patterns for the areas to which the automatic mapping cannot be performed.
- The complete approach should not modify the existing models to a large extent.

== See also ==
- CIM Profile
- Substation Configuration Language (SCL)
- IEC 61970
- IEC 61968
- IEC 62325
- IEC 61850
- MultiSpeak
