= Common Information Model =

Common Information Model may refer to:

- Common Information Model (computing), a standard that defines how managed elements in an IT environment are represented as a common set of objects and relationships between them
- Common Information Model (electricity), a standard used by electricity transmission network operators to communicate status information with other operators
