= Branson Ultrasonics =

American manufacturing company

- Type: Subsidiary of Emerson Electric
- Founded: 1946; 80 years ago Danbury, Connecticut, U.S.
- Founder: Norman G. Branson
- Headquarters: 120 Park Ridge Road Brookfield, Connecticut 06804, United States
- Key people: Vernon Murray (President)
- Products: Ultrasonic cleaning, Ultrasonic/sonic driller/corer, Ultrasonic machining, Ultrasonic welding
- Owner: Emerson Electric
- Website: www.emerson.com/en-us/automation/branson

Branson Ultrasonics Corporation is an American developer and manufacturer of ultrasonic manufacturing and cleaning applications.

== History ==
The company was founded in 1946 by Norman G. Branson, a research engineer for General Electric. He remained president and CEO of the company until 1967. In 1984, Branson Ultrasonics was purchased by Emerson Electric. In 2021, Branson Ultrasonics opened its new headquarters in Brookfield, Connecticut, a suburb of Danbury, where their headquarters was formerly located. In 2026, Branson Ultrasonics relocated its headquarters from Brookfield, CT to Farmington Hills, MI.

== Technology ==
Branson Ultrasonics specializes in the design, development and manufacturing of plastics joining and metal welding equipment. The company develops solutions for precision cleaning, degreasing and processing. The company also has expertise in ultrasonic tooling and magnetostrictive and piezoelectric technology. The company also manufactures the "Sonifier" brand of cell disrupters for laboratory experiments and research studies. The company operates manufacturing facilities in the United States, Canada, Mexico, Germany, the Netherlands, France, Slovakia, China, Hong Kong and Japan. It is ISO 14001 certified for its commitment to environmental efforts.
