= Dansette =

Record player (and brand of other devices)

Dansette was a British brand of record players, radiograms, tape recorders, and radio sets, manufactured by the London firm of J & A Margolin Ltd.

== Record player ==
The first Dansette record player was manufactured in 1952, by the London firm of J & A Margolin Ltd, and at least one million were sold in the 1950s and 1960s. Dansette became a household name in the late 1950s and 60s when the British music industry shot up in popularity after the arrival of acts such as Cliff Richard, The Beatles and The Shadows. Teenagers took various Dansette players to parties to listen to the latest records.

The Dansette was a versatile machine, with many being equipped to play 7-inch (180 mm), 10-inch (250 mm), and 12-inch (300 mm) discs of 78, 45, 33 1/3 and 16 2/3 rpm. Larger models such as the Bermuda could be fitted with optional legs for home use, while the Viva, Junior and Diplomat models were designed to be transportable, with a handle and studs affixed to the side of the case and latches to secure the protective lid. Like almost all record players of the day, they had built-in speakers. Some models of Dansette record players had a BSR autochanger allowing several records to be loaded at once, and played in succession.

Dansette players were expensive, and some experts and fans of the industry argue that the players were overrated. Despite this, the Dansette brand outsold other makes such as Dynatron, Bush, Kolster-Brandes, Ferguson and others.

Dansette set a "standard look" for all portable record players of the time - a latched lid on top, a speaker and control knobs on the front, and sometimes a carrying handle.

== Production ==
The first models available in 1950-51 were the Plus~a~Gram and the Senior. These were very expensive, and many teens and adults could not afford record players until later. It retailed at 33 guineas, which today would be approximately £800. (Note: £33 in 1950 is equivalent to £1,111 in 2018.) In 1962, a Dansette Popular 4 speed record player would be sold for 11 guineas and for another 2 guineas one could opt for the Bermuda with a 4 speed autochanger with legs. Despite this, many teenagers acquired one, taking them to parties, and purchasing the latest singles (45s). Many Dansettes were sold in December as Christmas presents, but the majority would be purchased with readily available "hire purchase". In 1958, Dansette started producing the Dansette Junior and later the De Luxe designed to appeal to the teenagers who would take them to and from parties.

== The end of Dansette production ==
By the late 1960s, recording techniques were becoming more sophisticated. Stereo had been virtually ignored until then and there was a change of direction from the 45 to the LP. Customers began to seek more modern hi-fi systems. Samuel Margolin later stated: "Inevitably the market dried up for record players. Imports from Japan took over the market with cut-throat competition and the company went into liquidation." Dansette production ended in December 1969, following the introduction of relatively cheap and efficient Japanese and other Far Eastern imported hi-fi equipment. During the years 1950-1969/70, over one million Dansettes were sold.

== See also ==
- List of phonograph manufacturers
