= Doug Korn =

American businessman

Douglas R. Korn
- Education: University of Pennsylvania; Harvard Business School
- Occupation: Businessman
- Employer: Victor Capital Partners

Doug Korn is an American Businessman and donor to, leader of, and fundraiser for numerous charitable organizations and causes.

== Personal life and education ==
Doug Korn earned a bachelor's degree with honors from the University of Pennsylvania's Wharton School with honors, and an MBA from Harvard Business School with high distinction as a George F. Baker Scholar.

Doug Korn has held volunteer leadership positions with numerous charitable organizations over many years. He received a presidential appointment to the United States Holocaust Memorial Council in 2008 and subsequently served as regional co-chair of the museum’s Campaign Committee. From 2020 through 2023 he served as Chair of the Board of Advisors of the University of Pennsylvania's Graduate School of Education and chaired its $100 million capital campaign. Korn is Chair of the Private Equity Division of UJA-Federation, a board member of the Penn GSE, a founding board member of YRF-Darca, and a member of the Harvard Business School Fund Council. He is a past trustee of Greenwich Academy and served on the board of Reach Out and Read.

The Korn Family has funded charitable scholarships, fellowships, or educational support funds at Harvard Business School, The University of Pennsylvania, and Greenwich Academy.

== Career ==
Doug Korn founded Victor Capital Partners, a private equity firm, in late 2015. He serves on the boards of Victor portfolio companies including Adventure Ready Brands, Coats Company, CODEGREEN, and SLIPNOT and previously was Chairman of PrimaLoft, which was sold to Compass Diversified for $530 million in 2022.

Korn was an investment partner at Irving Place Capital (formerly Bear Stearns Merchant Banking) from 1999 through July 2015 and was a senior advisor to Irving Place Capital from July 2015 to July 2017. His former portfolio company boards at Irving Place Capital and Bear Stearns Merchant Banking include Aearo Technologies, Chromalox, CH4 Energy II, Ironshore Insurance, Playcore, Reddy Ice, Victor Technologies, and Vitamin Shoppe.

Previously, Doug Korn was a co-founder of Eos Partners, LP, serving as a managing director from 1994 to 1998. He also served as a vice president at Blackstone Group after beginning his career in investment banking at Morgan Stanley & Co.

Victor Capital acquired The Coats Company, a manufacturer and service of tire changing equipment, from Vontier Corporation for $72.5 million in January, 2024.

In January 2021, Victor invested in SLIPNOT, the leading provider of metal non-slip surface technologies to prevent slip and fall injuries.

In October 2019, Victor Capital announced the acquisition of businesses which offer commercial real estate owners an array of services related to building code, zoning, and land use compliance and inspection as well as sustainability, energy management, and decarbonization.

In January 2019, Victor Capital announced the acquisition of Tender Corporation, which sells a range of branded consumer products in safety, preparedness, and first aid. Tender Corporation changed its name to Adventure Ready Brands in June, 2020.

In October 2017, Victor Capital announced the acquisition of Primaloft, a materials science company specializing in synthetic insulations and fabrics. In October 2018, PrimaLoft received the Product of the Year top prize at the Outdoor Retailer Innovation Awards in Denver, Colorado for PrimaLoft Bio, the first biodegradable synthetic insulation for outerwear.

Irving Place Capital agreed in February 2014 to sell Victor Technologies to Colfax Corporation for $947.3 million including the assumption of debt. IPC owned Victor since 2010 when it took the company (then known as Thermadyne Holdings) private in a transaction that valued the company at about $417 million. During its holding period, Victor expanded its global manufacturing footprint, consolidated its brand portfolio, and accelerated new product development, among other initiatives. Its sale to Colfax is said to generate a more than 3x return and an IRR above 50% for IPC.

IPC announced its sale of PlayCore to another private equity firm in May 2014 for an undisclosed price. During IPC's ownership, PlayCore completed nine strategic acquisitions which enhanced its product offering and allowed it to reach a broader customer base.

IPC's investment in Vitamin Shoppe was named Middle Market Deal of the Year by Buyouts Magazine in 2011. The investment in Vitamin Shoppe was also recognized by the Private Equity Growth Capital Council for its success in adding over 400 stores (starting with 128) and over 2500 American jobs. Vitamin Shoppe was purchased by IPC's predecessor in 2002 for a value estimated by The Wall Street Journal at about $300 million.

IPC's predecessor sold Aearo Technologies for $765 million in February 2006 after paying a reported $381 million for the company, then called Aearo Safety, two years earlier. The $80 million investment was reported by the Indianapolis Business Journal to have returned an estimated 4.1x on BSMB's investment.

In February 2015, Fosun International Ltd. completed the purchase of a 20% interest in Ironshore for a reported $463.8 million. Subsequently, Fosun purchased the remaining 80% of Ironshore for a reported $1.84 billion.

On May 25, 2017, UK public company Spirax-Sarco Engineering PLC announced it had entered into an agreement to acquire Chromalox for $415 million. On July 3, 2017 Spirax-Sarco announced the completion of that transaction.

== Political activities ==
Korn has been involved in national politics for many years and was a major backer of Mitt Romney during the 2012 US presidential election.
