= Operator Training Simulator =

An operator training simulator (OTS) is a computer-based training system that uses a dynamic simulation model of an industrial process, usually integrated with an emulator of the process plant's distributed control system (DCS).

== Elements ==
An OTS uses a dynamic simulation of the process in order to generate the appropriated data to feed an emulation of the plant's control system. The elements of a typical OTS are the following:

- Dynamic simulation software
- Process model
- Instructor interface
- Control system integration software
- DCS emulator
- Replica of the operator station

== Applications ==
Common applications of OTS systems are the following:

- New control room operator training (e.g., start-up, shutdown, and emergency procedures)
- Existing control room operator refresher training (e.g., start-up, shutdown, and emergency procedures)
- Platform for advanced process control (APC) and optimization
- Validating DCS control and logic checkout
- Validating and improving plant operating procedures
- “What if?” analysis (scenario analysis)
- Engineering tool for developing and testing new control strategies

== See also ==
- Dispatcher training simulator, a computer system for training operators of electrical power grids
- E-learning
