= APM Automation Solutions =

Israeli company manufacturing automation components

- Industry: Measurement
- Founded: 2005
- Fate: Acquired
- Headquarters: Tel Aviv, Israel
- Parent: Emerson Process Management
- Website: www.apm-solutions.com

APM Automation Solutions is an Israeli-based developer of solids volume and level measurement instrumentation established in Tel Aviv, Israel. The APM technology is used in all the bulk solids industries such as: food and beverage, metals and mining, power, cement, coal, chemical, pulp and paper, and other industries. The outfit recently became part of the Emerson Process Management business under Rosemount Brand.

== History ==
APM Automation Solutions was established in 2005 in Tel Aviv by Ofir Perl and Yossi Zlotnick. The co-founders have been involved in managing and leading large-scale development projects in telecommunications and signal processing fields for many years.

APM Automation Solutions has set a network of global distributors/agents that supply its products in over 30 countries across the US, Europe and Asia-Pacific. On December 18, 2013, APM Automation Solutions was acquired by Emerson Process Management. By this acquisition, Emerson expands its capabilities in solids measurement applications. Emerson operates in 150 countries and has a market cap of $48.1 billion on the New York Stock Exchange with annual sales of $24.4 billion in 2015.

APM Automation Solutions is a manufacturer of volume and level measurement instrumentation. The company offers acoustic imaging and 3D mapping technologies for the food & beverage, metals and mining, power, chemical production, cement, coal, pulp and paper industries.

== See also ==
- Application performance management
- Emerson Electric
