= IEC 61968 =

Series of communication protocol standards

IEC 61968 is a series of standards under development that will define standards for information exchanges between electrical distribution systems. These standards are being developed by Working Group 14 of Technical Committee 57 of the International Electrotechnical Commission (IEC TC 57 WG14). IEC 61968 is intended to support the inter-application integration of a utility enterprise that needs to collect data from different applications that are legacy or new and each has different interfaces and run-time environments. IEC 61968 defines interfaces for all the major elements of an interface architecture for distribution management systems (DMS) and is intended to be implemented with middleware services that broker messages among applications.

== Standards ==
- IEC 61968-1 – Interface architecture and general requirements [Published]
- IEC 61968-2 – Glossary [Published]
- IEC 61968-3 – Interface for Network Operations [NO] [Published]
- IEC 61968-4 – Interfaces for Records and Asset management [AM] [Published]
- IEC 61968-5 – Interfaces for Distributed Energy Optimization [DER] [Published]
- IEC 61968-6 – Interfaces for Maintenance & Construction [MC] [Published]
- IEC 61968-7 – Interfaces for Network Extension Planning [NE] [Under Development]
- IEC 61968-8 – Interfaces for Customer Support [CS] [Published]
- IEC 61968-9 – Interface Standard for Meter Reading & Control [MR] [Published]
- IEC 61968-10 – Interfaces for Business functions external to distribution management [Retired]. This includes Energy management & trading [EMS], Retail [RET], Supply Chain & Logistics [SC], Customer Account Management [ACT], Financial [FIN], Premises [PRM] & Human Resources [HR]
- IEC 61968-11 – Common Information Model (CIM) Extensions for Distribution [Published]
- IEC 61968-12 – Common Information Model (CIM) Use Cases for 61968 [Retired]
- IEC 61968-13 – Common Information Model (CIM) RDF Model exchange format for distribution [Published]
- IEC 61968-14-1-3 to 14-1-10 – Proposed IEC Standards to Map IEC 61968 and MultiSpeak Standards [Under Development]
- IEC 61968-14-2-3 to 14-2-10 – Proposed IEC Standards to Create a CIM Profile to Implement MultiSpeak Functionality [Under Development]
- IEC 61968-100 – Application Integration

== See also ==
- IEC 61850
- IEC 61970
