= Voice of Music =

- Founded: June 1944 in Benton Harbor, Michigan
- Founder: Walter Miller

Voice Of Music (abbreviated V-M) was the premier brand of V-M Corporation, an American audio equipment manufacturing company (EIA manufacturer's code 857).

== History ==
V-M Corporation was founded in June 1944 by Walter Miller in Benton Harbor, Michigan. The company originally manufactured only 78 rpm record changers and labelled them simply as "A V-M Product". The brand name "Voice of Music" was suggested by a V-M engineer and first used in 1952.

V-M designed a two-speed changer after Columbia Records introduced the LP in 1948, then added the 45 rpm speed after RCA brought that innovation to market in 1949. In 1954, V-M added the fourth speed (16 2/3 rpm) for "talking books." A new changer mechanism, used throughout the 1950s, 1960s, and 1970s was developed in 1950. The basic design was retained until record changer production was terminated and was updated throughout the years to keep V-M's record changers aligned with their competitors. The speed control mechanism was redesigned in 1961. V-M Corporation claimed that their record changers were jam-proof and enjoyed a reputation of being both well-built and reliable. These mass-produced record changers, while competitive with other manufacturers' products, i.e. BSR and Garrard, in both build quality and product specifications, were not competitive with high-end record changers. Like other mass-produced record changers, some tonearms had heavier vertical tracking force (VTF), and poorer speed accuracy and rumble specifications than higher grade record changers. V-M mass-produced record changers, like their competitors' offerings, were used in low to medium priced audio equipment – compact systems, console stereos, and portable systems. Unlike their competitors, V-M often customized their units for large OEM customers with uniquely styled controls, platter mats, colors, tonearms, and trim pieces. They were sold also as separate components. Most had ceramic cartridges with dual style stylus for LPs/45s, and one for 78 rpm records. Most had two pole synchronous motors. From the late 1950s onward, V-M record changers, sold to original equipment manufacturers (OEM), were either unlabeled or labelled with the OEM customer's trademark. Record changers sold to OEM customers were sold in two configurations; fully assembled or unassembled, requiring final assembly, at half the OEM fully assembled price.

V-M developed its first high-end record changer in 1966. This record changer had a 24-pole synchronous motor and a separate motor for operating the tone arm and lowering the record to the turntable. This professional record changer was a two-speed unit and did not play 78 rpm records. This professional record changer was marketed under the Voice of Music trademark and also sold to other manufacturers such as Sherwood, Philco (Ford), and Westinghouse. Their second-generation professional record changers design was developed in 1971 and was sold to BIC. V-M's deteriorating financial condition did not permit V-M to market this design under the Voice of Music trademark.

Amplified phonographs were introduced in the early 1950s, and V-M introduced the Model 700 tape recorder late in 1954. Throughout the 1950s and 1960s, tape recorders, phonographs, consoles, and components by V-M were popular with consumers for a variety of reasons. V-M Corporation's "Educational Systems" tape recorders and phones with rugged cases were popular with schools and institutions. A brief entry into the audiophile market in 1970 with the V-M "Professional Series" was technically successful – but by this point, V-M Corporation was too financially weak to back a successful marketing campaign, so these products are rare and sought after today.

First and foremost, V-M was a record changer and tape deck supplier (less the electronics) to dozens of familiar brand names of their day, such as Zenith and Motorola to name only two. V-M Corporation, from the late 1950s through 1968, was the world's largest record changer manufacturer. During the peak years of record changer production, V-M Corporation produced more record changers than all other record changer manufacturers combined. In the early 1960s, V-M Corporation advertisements were placed in an audio magazine, stating this fact. Also, in this advertisement, V-M listed their original equipment manufacturers, (customers), by name. BSR Ltd, a British record changer manufacturer, in the 1970s, copied the format of this ad. V-M produced over three million record changers in 1966. By 1969, BSR had surpassed V-M Corporation in record changer production to become the world's largest manufacturer of record changers. In several countries, V-M record changers were produced under license. Telefunken, of then West Germany, was one such manufacturer signing a licensing agreement with V-M Corporation to utilize their record changer technology. JVC is known to have produced a copy of the V-M 1200 series without a license. Large record changer production volumes helped V-M keep its own Voice of Music brand profitable for many years. After 1965, American audio companies began going out of business or shifting production overseas. As V-M's record changer volumes declined, it became difficult for the company to remain profitable. Retailing began to change from small "mom and pop" stores (V-M's strength) to large electronics retailers where V-M was under-represented. At the end of 1972, V-M quit offering console stereos and terminated all tape recorder model sales to retail customers, with the exception of an eight-track player. At the end of 1974, all remaining retail products, except record changers, were discontinued. After 1974, V-M record changers were the only consumer product sold to the retail market as components. Record changers continued to be sold to original equipment manufacturers up to the bankruptcy in mid-July, 1977. Cassette decks still produced, after leaving the retail consumer market, were highly specialized professional units. Some of the companies that bought these professional cassette decks were New Century Education Corporation, Beltone, and Terra Technology. V-M also did contract engineering projects for various manufacturers, along with some assembly projects for outside companies. For the December 1976 Christmas Season, V-M assembled an electronic ping pong game for Factory Direct Marketing.

== Bankruptcy ==
V-M filed for bankruptcy in mid-July 1977 when a power failure in New York City prevented a wire transfer of critically needed funds. At first within the bankruptcy, V-M Corporation was regulated by the Bankruptcy Court and had to obtain permission for all activity, especially manufacturing. Customers had to prepay for any manufacturing or services performed since V-M could not use the creditors' money. V-M projects done, while under Bankruptcy Court supervision, included reworking 20,000 turntables for Thompson Electronics of France in 1978 and 1979. V-M also manufactured Model 270-6 monaural record changers, and a number of cassette decks for New Century Education Corporation, Beltone, and Terra Technology. (Assembly of cassette decks continued through the calendar year of 1989.) All manufacturing ceased by September 1979 when the bankruptcy auction occurred. Of the ten buildings V-M Corporation owned at the time of the bankruptcy, only a few were sold. Building number #17 did not sell and this was the building V-M operated out of from 1979 until it was demolished in September 1998.

After the bankruptcy auction, October 1979 through the calendar year of 1991, V-M Corporation had a small group of people employed rebuilding/repairing telephones for AT&T, along with other small projects. One such project, in 1985, involved Factory Direct Marketing having V-M repair a large quantity of Cobra feature phones, AT&T answering machines, and radio/cassette players. V-M also did some assembly of model 791/792 tape duplicators as late as 1989 for continuing customers. By 1992, none of these projects remained profitable. From 1992 to 1998, V-M Corporation's business activities were limited to selling parts and service manuals for V-M products manufactured in the past, and helping owners of V-M equipment to link up with qualified service shops. In September 1998, building #17, V-M Corporation's former office building, and building #1, the former record changer plant, were demolished.

== Present ==
In September 1998, the service parts and technical files were transferred to the care of V-M Audio Enthusiasts at the website shown below. The revival of "vinyl" (records) and tube audio in recent years has sparked a renewed interest in quality-built, easy-to-service V-M products. V-M Audio Enthusiasts offers original and remanufactured parts for V-M record changers and tape recorders.
