= CIM Profile =

In electric power transmission, a CIM Profile is a subset model of the CIM UML model. These profiles are designated as parts documents in the IEC 61970 standard by working group 14. Each profile is itself a self-contained model which can be used for generating specific artifacts, such as CIM RDF or XML Schema.

== Profile Groups ==
A CIM Profile Group (e.g., 61970-456 Steady-state Solution Profile Group) is a logical grouping of CIM Profiles. In general, each Parts document encompasses an entire Profile group which has one or more profiles in it.

== Standards ==
- IEC 61970-452
  Equipment Profile
- IEC 61970-453
  Schematics Layout Profile
- IEC 61970-456
  Analog Measurements Profile
  Discrete Measurements Profile
  State Variable Profile
  Topology Profile

== See also ==
- IEC 61970
- CIM
