= AMS Device Manager =

- Type: Plant Asset Management, Asset Management Software, Asset Management System
- Released: 1996-2016

AMS Device Manager is plant asset management software from Asset Optimization (a business unit of Emerson Automation Solutions). It provides a single application for predictive diagnostics, documentation, calibration management, and device configuration for managing field instruments and digital valve controllers.

AMS Device Manager is based on open communication standards, and is a core component of the Plantweb digital plant architecture.

== Common uses ==
AMS Device Manager is used in chemical, food & beverage, life sciences, LNG, pulp & paper, refining, and water & wastewater companies. It is used to increase quality, throughput, and availability, while reducing costs around operations & maintenance, safety, health & environment, In addition, AMS Device Manager facilitates plants and mills to startup faster and deliver a significant return on investment.

== Communication ==
AMS Device Manager supports digital instrument inputs and outputs; FOUNDATION fieldbus, HART, PROFIBUS DP, PROFIBUS PA, and WirelessHART.
