= Astec =

Defunct power supply manufacturer

Astec International plc
- Formerly: Astec (BSR) plc (1985–1999)
- Industry: Electric power conversion
- Founded: 1971; 55 years ago in British Hong Kong
- Founders: Brian Christopher; Neal Stewart
- Defunct: 2014; 12 years ago
- Fate: Dissolved
- Number of employees: 11,000 (2002)
- Parent: Birmingham Sound Reproducers (1980–1999); Emerson Electric (1989–2013); Artesyn (2013–2014)
- Website: astec.com at the Wayback Machine (archived 2008-01-02)

Astec International plc, better known as Astec Power or just Astec, was an international electronics company originally based in British Hong Kong that manufactured power supply units and electric power conversion hardware. It was a major vendor of power supply units for computer systems, and for a time it was the largest global manufacturer of power supplies.

== History ==
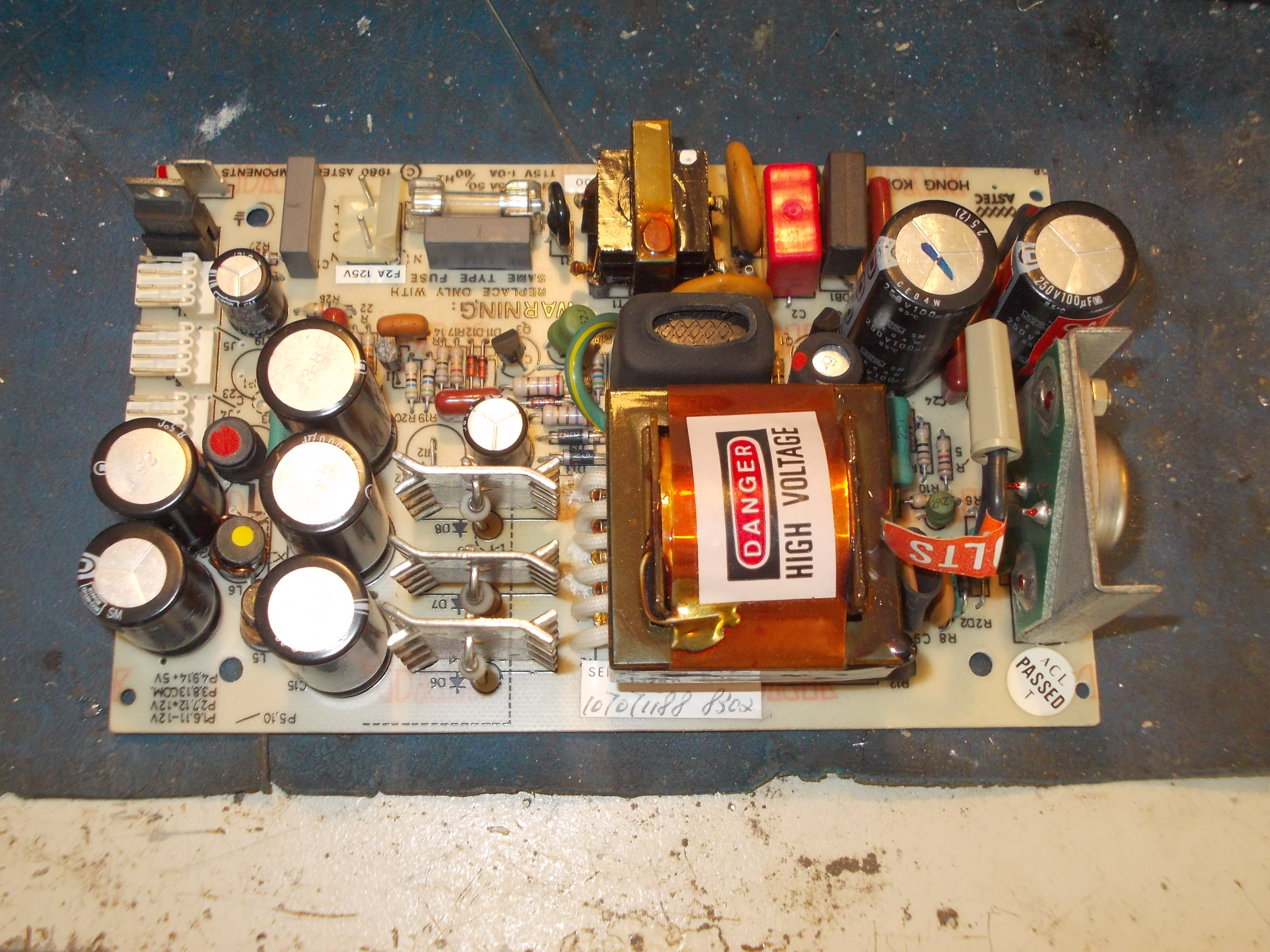
Power supply unit from an Osborne 1 portable computer manufactured by Astec

Astec was founded in British Hong Kong in 1971 by Brian Christopher and Neal Stewart, as a producer of DC-to-DC converter hardware. Before founding Astec, Christopher had previously worked for IBM, while Stewart was an academic physicist. The company was founded with HK$2.4 million in start-up capital.

Astec's converters were initially purchased chiefly by manufacturers of electronic calculators, a market which was experiencing meteoric growth in the early 1970s. As the calculator market started to mature in the late 1970s, Astec started producing switched-mode power supply for the burgeoning personal computer market. In 1977, Astec signed a contract with Apple Computer to become the primary supplier of PSUs for their Apple II family of home computer systems. In 1981, IBM contracted Astec to manufacture the power supply unit of the original IBM PC. Their relationship with IBM lasted well over a decade and won them contracts with other computer vendors such as Hewlett-Packard. Helped by these lucrative contracts, Astec grew to become the world's largest manufacturer of power supply units by 1985, taking the top spot from Lambda Electronics. The company were helped especially by their relationship with Apple, which had netted Astec $50 million in sales alone by June 1983.

Birmingham Sound Reproducers (BSR), a British manufacturer of home audio equipment, purchased a controlling 53.6-percent stake in the company in May 1980. In 1981, BSR purchased the remaining 46.4 percent in Astec, acquiring the company outright. BSR had been struggling from debt and diminished sales around the time of the purchase, with Astec being BSR's only profitable asset in the fiscal year 1980, generating £1.3 million while the rest of the company posted losses in excess of £17.6 million. The acquisition of Astec was a success for BSR and saved the parent company from bankruptcy. By 1984, BSR began shedding its home audio assets as computer power supplies became the company's core business. By the late 1980s, BSR was renamed to Astec (BSR) plc.

In 1989, Emerson Electric, an American manufacturer of electronic equipment, purchased a controlling stake (between 45 and 50 percent) in Astec (BSR) plc in exchange for several of Emerson's subsidiaries, including its largest power supply unit manufacturer ACDC Electronics. Emerson shortly after consolidated five of their other subsidiaries into Astec, massively growing the latter company. In 1999 Emerson acquired the remaining half of Astec outright. Sales in Astec began dwindling in the early 2000s amid the concurrent global downturn in the computer industry, and in 2006 Emerson folded Astec into Artesyn, another large power conversion company which Emerson had acquired that year. Astec remained a division of Artesyn until 2014, when it was folded into the newly formed Artesyn Embedded Technologies, a company formed in the aftermath of Emerson's divestiture of Artesyn in 2013.
