= Record changer =

Device that plays phonograph records

A record changer or autochanger is a device that plays several phonograph records in sequence without user intervention. Record changers first appeared in the late 1920s, and were common until the 1980s.

== History ==
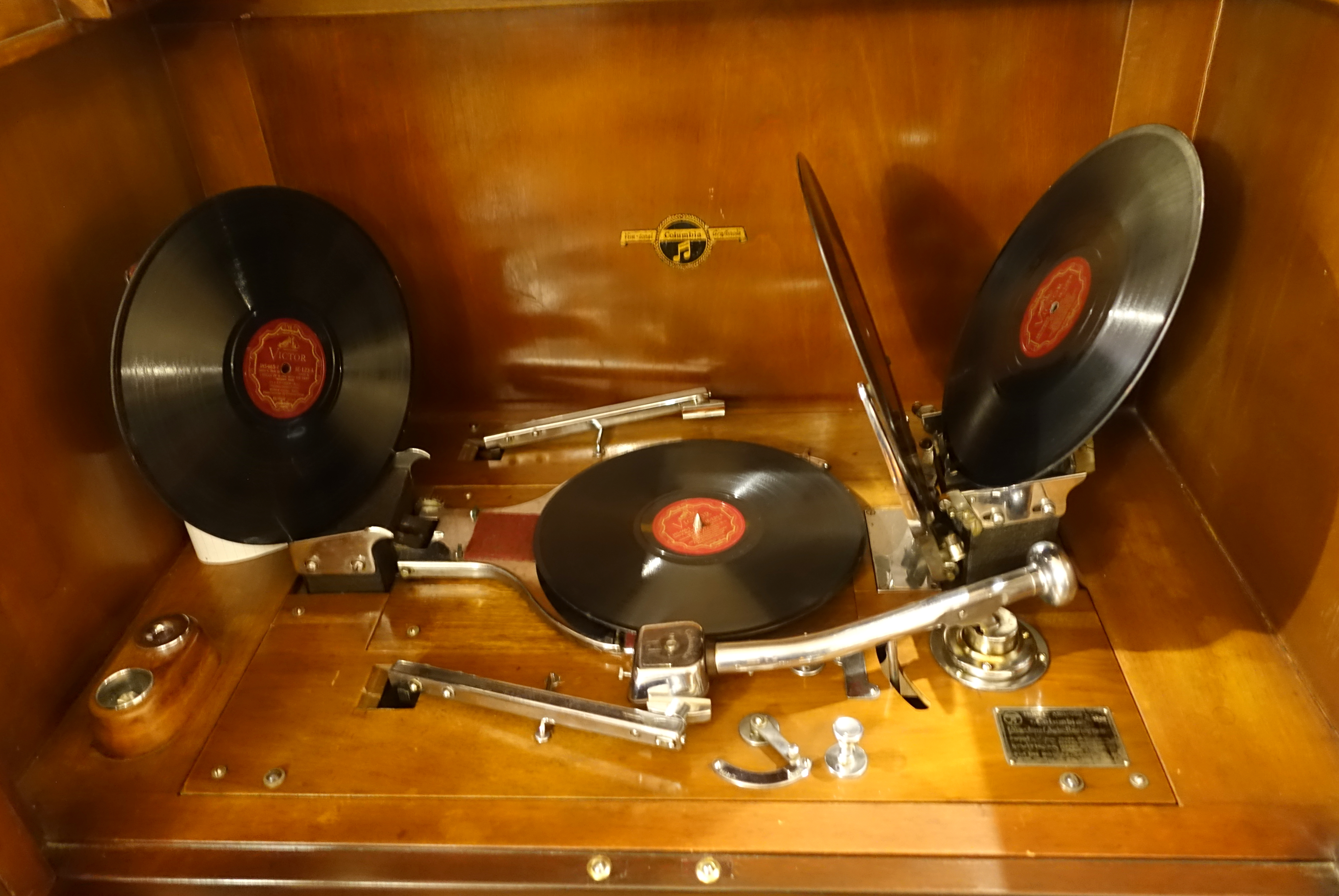
Nippon Columbia record changer

The record changer with a stepped centre spindle design was invented by Eric Waterworth of Hobart, Australia, in 1925. He and his father took it to Sydney, and arranged with a company called Home Recreations to fit it into its forthcoming phonograph, the Salonola. Although this novelty was demonstrated at the 1927 Sydney Royal Easter Show, Home Recreations went into liquidation and the Salonola was never marketed. In 1928, the Waterworths travelled to London, where they sold their patent to the new Symphony Gramophone and Radio Co. Ltd.

Eric Waterworth built three prototypes of his invention, one of which was sold to Home Recreations as a model for its proposed Salonola record player as cited above, which is now reportedly in the collection of the Museum of Applied Arts & Sciences in Sydney. The second prototype went to England with Eric and his father, and was sold as part of the deal with the Symphony Gramophone and Radio Company. The fate of this machine is unknown. The third prototype was never fully assembled, and lay in pieces under the Waterworths' house for something like sixty years. After Eric's death, the family found the disassembled parts of the machine and offered them to the Sound Preservation Association of Tasmania. The offer was accepted, and an enthusiastic member began the task of reassembling the prototype. Only a few small parts were found to be missing, and enough remained to finish assembling it and restoring it to a crude working condition. This prototype record changer is now on display at the Sound Preservation Association of Tasmania resource centre in the Hobart suburb of Bellerive.

The first commercially successful record changer was the "Automatic Orthophonic" model by the Victor Talking Machine Company, which was launched in the United States in 1927. On a conventional gramophone or phonograph, the limited playing time of 78 rpm gramophone records (averaging a little over four minutes per 12-inch side, and a little over three per 10-inch side) meant that listeners had to get up to change records at regular intervals. The Automatic Orthophonic allowed the listener to load a stack of several records into the machine, which would then be automatically played in sequence for a much longer uninterrupted listening time.

By the late 1950s, Garrard (of Britain) and Dual (Germany) dominated the high-end record changer market in the United States. From the late 1950s through the late 1960s, VM Corporation (Voice of Music) of Benton Harbor, Michigan, US, dominated the lower-priced original equipment manufacturer (OEM) American record changer market. Most VM record changers were sold to OEM audio manufacturers such as Zenith and installed in console-sized, portable or compact low- to mid-priced stereo or mono systems. VM record changers sold to OEMs were not labelled with the Voice of Music trademark on the unit itself; only those retailed by VM Corporation, either as separate components or integral parts of VM phonographs, were labelled with the VM (Voice of Music) trademark on the changer. Outside the US, VM record-changer technology was licensed to several manufacturers. Telefunken, of then West Germany, was one such company to sign a licensing agreement with VM Corporation. By the mid to late 1960s, a British company BSR–MacDonald displaced VM as the world's largest record-changer manufacturer and dominated the OEM changer market in the US as well.

Garrard, in 1960, introduced a high fidelity record changer with a professional grade balanced tonearm and heavy cast non-magnetic platter, both features previously found only on manual turntables. To distinguish it by its superior performance, it was called an "automatic turntable." The name, and the improved performance, caught on and other manufacturers began producing automatic turntables with professional-grade features and performance.

Most mid-priced consumer record players of the 1950s through the 1970s were equipped with changers, but they started to decline in popularity as cassettes and compact discs replaced vinyl records in the 1980s and 1990s. Record-stacking changers eventually became rarer due to the gradually growing belief that they contributed greatly to record wear and "warping," and were eventually superseded by manual turntables which served as separate parts of component systems or were integrated into compact systems that played one record at a time and were felt by some to save record wear by gentler treatment during play.

== Operation ==
Record-changer mechanisms were sometimes complicated. They typically held a stack of records on an extended central spindle supported by an arm (separate from the tonearm housing the cartridge and stylus which played the records). Some units had feelers that could detect the size of each record (the three standard sizes being 7, 10 or 12 inches) and accordingly position the tone arm at the start of the disc (its outer edge). Some used a variable-size sensor which allowed sizes other than the standard three to be played. The simpler models required the record diameter to be set manually, and hence did not allow records of different sizes to be stacked together. The following automatic size detecting devices were the most popular (with examples):

Three-size sensors:

- Size-selector knob – no size intermix (BSR, 1968 to 1980s).
- Size- and speed-selector knob – no size intermix, so that some types couldn't be played automatically (Garrard after 1969).
- Rising feelers in or alongside turntable – no size intermix, but automatic sensing of size (PE after 1970)
- Falling record sensor – random intermix – sizes mixed in any order (BSR before 1968. Garrard Auto-Slim variants. Some RCA. Silvertone.).
- Rising and falling record sensors – intermix 10- and 12-inch records vs. separate playing of 7-inch (VM 1950 to 1970. Admiral Ensign series.).
- Unplayed stack sensor – arranged intermix, large records before small (Webster Chicago 1950 to 1953)
- Unplayed stack arm tip sensor – arranged intermix (Collaro/Magnavox after 1967)

Variable-size sensors:

- Pickup arm scan of unplayed stack – arranged intermix, odd sizes (Collaro/Magnavox 1954 to 1967)
- Pickup arm scan of lowered record – random intermix, odd sizes (PE 1957 to 1969)
- Arm tip feeler wheels (feel only top record on turntable) – random intermix, odd sizes (Dual 1003, 1004, 1005, 1006)
- Arm top feeler wheels (feel only bottom record on stack) – random intermix, odd sizes (Miracord 9 and 90)
- Pickup arm scan of separated record – random intermix, odd sizes (Thorens TD-224)

Audiophiles eventually disdained record changers because of the perceived compromise in fidelity resulting from changes in tone arm angle with the height of the stack, and concerns about changers' seemingly rough treatment of discs, particularly due to slight but cumulative damage to the spindle holes as the records were dropped from a height of a few inches onto the record or stack below or the turntable platter; as well as some sliding and rubbing of the discs together, scratching the record labels in the process, because the dropped disc didn't immediately accelerate to the rotational speed of the spindle or discs below it. Most of these fears were unfounded in changers made after 1953. More advanced changers, such as the TD-224 model from Thorens and the ADC Accutrac+6, partially addressed these problems.

== Automatic sequencing ==
Numbering of the sides of the discs in many double and triple albums, and boxed sets of records (both 78s and LPs) in a certain sequence enabled them to be stacked and played on record changers. After the discs were stacked and one side of each disc had played, the entire stack would be turned over and replaced on the changer shelf. Thus, to be heard in the proper sequence, each disc of a four-disc set would contain, respectively, "sides" 1&8, 2&7, 3&6 and 4&5 – a practice known as "automatic sequencing", "changer sequencing" or "auto-coupling". In pre-LP days, classical symphonies and concertos, and later, original cast albums, would be recorded using this format.

This "drop-automatic sequence" was designed for record changers which simply dropped records rather than reversing the stack as it was played in sequence. Other record changers, including some made as far back as the 1930s by RCA and GE in addition to the much later Thorens TD-224, were capable of reversing the stack automatically. The RCA and GE units kept the records stacked on the turntable and slid the top record to the side after playing it. A separate sequence, the "slide-automatic sequence," was made for these changers, with sides coupled 1&5, 2&6, 3&7 and 4&8.

Some record changers could play both sides of each record. Manual sequence (sides coupled 1&2, 3&4, 5&6 and 7&8) worked with these. Examples were the Markel 75, Capehart turnover, Fisher/Lincoln, Garrard RC-100, and Thorens Symphony CD50/CD53 changers.

During the late 1930s and early 1940s, Victor released 78 rpm record sets in all three sequences (with set numbers preceded by M for manual, DM for drop-automatic or AM for slide-automatic sequencing), for players of each of the three kinds it manufactured. Columbia used MM for drop-automatic sets of three or more records, X for manual and MX for two-record drop-automatic sets.

Some radio station copies were produced in "relay sequence" to be played by a DJ on two turntables with no break between sides, which were coupled as 1&3, 2&4, 5&7 and 6&8. The slide-automatic sequence also allowed uninterrupted play with two turntables.

== See also ==
- CD changer
