= MultiSpeak =

MultiSpeak is a specification that defines standardized interfaces among software applications commonly used by electric utilities, defining details of data that must be exchanged between software applications to support common utility processes. It is funded by the National Rural Electric Cooperative Association (NRECA).

The National Institute of Standards and Technology (NIST) has developed a Smart Grid Conceptual Reference Model as part of its Smart Grid Standards Framework and Roadmap, and has identified 42 standards to support this vision. NIST chose MultiSpeak as a key standard in the Operations area of the NIST Conceptual Model.

The MultiSpeak specification is the most widely applied integration standard in North American distribution utilities. It is currently used in the daily operations of more than 600 electric cooperatives, investor-owned utilities, municipals, and public power districts in at least 15 countries. Over 80 software vendors have joined the MultiSpeak initiative and contribute their experience to refining the standard.

The MultiSpeak standard utilizes three components:

- Definitions of common data semantics: Details of data that is exchanged, documented in XML schema.
- Definitions of message structure: Message structures supporting data interchanges. Web services calls with specific structures are used for real-time exchanges.
- Definition of messages required to support specific business process steps: Details of the business process steps to accomplish the data.

== Comparison between CIM and MultiSpeak ==
- CIM covers transmission, generation and distribution whereas MultiSpeak is distribution focused.
- MultiSpeak is focused to meet the needs of electric cooperatives in the US, while IEC 61968 / CIM is focused towards all utilities in the international marketplace.
- IEC 61968 is transport independent while MultiSpeak is transport specific. SOAP messages using HTTP, TCP/IP sockets connections directly between applications, and file-based transfers are used for transferring data in MultiSpeak.
- Both standards use XML Schema for definition of messages and focus on interfaces between applications, as opposed to data structures internal to applications.
- Message headers can be readily mapped between MultiSpeak and IEC 61968 but mapping of message content between the two is more complex.

== Harmonization between MultiSpeak and 61968 ==
In June 2008 MultiSpeak and WG14 announced an initiative to establish two sets of standards that will lead towards harmonization of their respective specifications. After completion of the same, this will provide a mapping between MultiSpeak Version 4.0, IEC 61970 Version 13, and IEC 61968 Version 10. Two sets of standard work planned for the same are listed below:

- IEC 61968-14-1-3 to 14-1-10 — Proposed IEC Standards to Map IEC61968 and MultiSpeak Standards.
- IEC 61968-14-2-3 to 14-2-10 — Proposed IEC Standards to Create a CIM Profile to Implement MultiSpeak Functionality.

== MultiSpeak Versions ==
- MultiSpeak version 5.0 was first released 2/18/2015.
- MultiSpeak version 4.1 was first released 6/30/2010.
- MultiSpeak version 3.0 was first released 10/20/2005.

== See also ==
- IEC 61968
- IEC 61970
- CIM
