= IEC 61970 =

IEC standard

The IEC 61970 series of standards by the International Electrotechnical Commission (IEC) deals with the application program interfaces for energy management systems (EMS). The series provides a set of guidelines and standards to facilitate:

- The integration of applications developed by different suppliers in the control center environment
- The exchange of information to systems external to the control center environment, including transmission, distribution and generation systems external to the control center that need to exchange real-time data with the control center
- The provision of suitable interfaces for data exchange across legacy and new systems

IEC 61970 is created and maintained by IEC Technical Committee 57 (TC 57).

== Set of standards ==
The complete set of standards includes the following parts:

- IEC 61970-1: Guidelines and general requirements
- IEC 61970-2: Glossary of terms
- IEC 61970-3XX: Common Information Model (CIM)
- IEC 61970-4XX: Generic Interface Definition (GID)
- IEC 61970-5XX: Common Interface System Technology Mappings

== See also ==
- CIM Profile
- IEC 61850
- IEC 61968
- MultiSpeak
