= Birmingham Sound Reproducers =

20th-century British manufacturer

- Industry: Manufacturing; Electronics
- Founded: 1932; 94 years ago in Birmingham
- Founder: Daniel McLean McDonald
- Defunct: 1985
- Fate: Dissolved

Birmingham Sound Reproducers (BSR) was a 20th-century British manufacturer of record player turntables, reel-to-reel tape recorder mechanisms and, for a time, housewares.

== History ==
=== Early years ===
Daniel McLean McDonald (1905–1991) founded Birmingham Sound Reproducers as a private company in 1932 in the West Midlands of England. By 1947, the company chiefly manufactured communications sets (intercoms), laboratory test equipment, and sound recording and reproducing instruments including phonographs.

=== Record turntables and related products ===
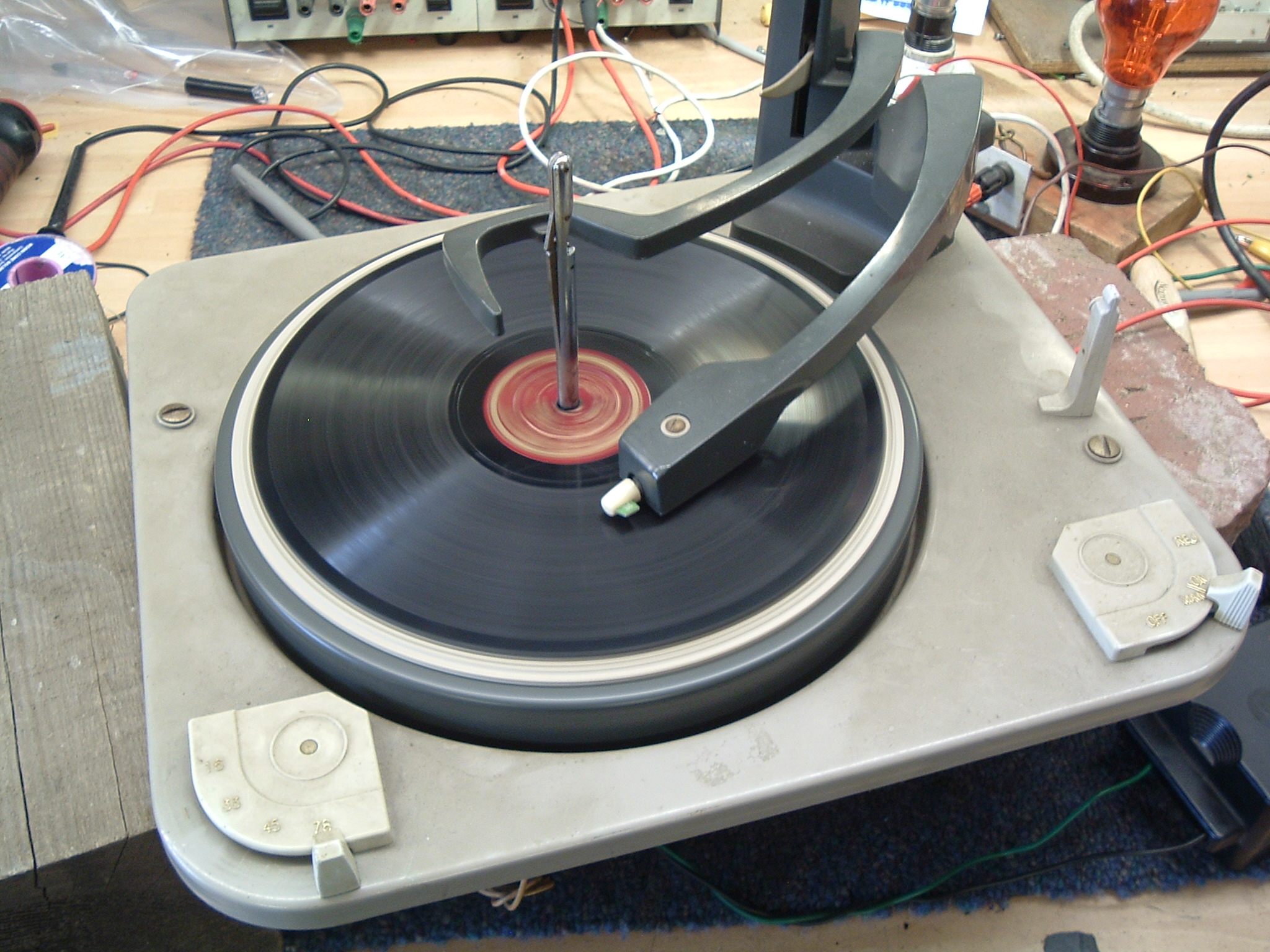
Barebones BSR turntable unit from 1961

In the early 1950s, Samuel Margolin began buying auto-changing turntables from BSR, using them as the basis of his Dansette record player. Over the next twenty years, Margolin manufactured more than a million of these players, and "Dansette" became a household word in Britain.

In 1957, BSR, also known by the name BSR McDonald, became a public company which by 1961 had grown to employ 2,600. It supplied turntables and autochangers to many of the world’s record player manufacturers, eventually gaining 87% of the market. The company also manufactured their own brand of player, the Monarch automatic record changer, which could select and play 7", 10" and 12" records at 16, 33 1/3, 45 or 78 rpm, automatically intermixing differing disc sizes, although the speed had to be changed manually. By 1977, BSR's factories were producing over 250,000 units a week; the majority of record changers installed in console stereos and bookshelf stereo systems during this era were manufactured by BSR.

BSR also made tape recorder mechanisms. Bang & Olufsen used BSR's TD2 tape deck in their Beocord Belcanto from 1962.

During 1975, with the help of Pico Electronics, BSR started the manufacture of a new upmarket turntable for its ADC line called the Accutrac 4000 at its Garratts Lane factory in Cradley Heath. This turntable had individual track selection capabilities, allowing the user to play specified individual tracks from an LP side in any order desired. It had a direct drive turntable motor, and a high quality ADC LMA1 cartridge and stylus. This was further developed into a record changer called the Accutrac 3500 which, in addition to track selection, handled a stack of up to six singles or LPs. Both machines were equipped with an ultrasonic remote control.

Changing home audio trends affected BSR in the early 1980s. Although the company produced reel-to-reel tape decks in addition to their turntables and changers, consumers began to expect portability from their music players, and BSR faced competition from cassette tape players, particularly Sony's Walkman. In the first five years of the 1980s, BSR closed several factories and made thousands of workers redundant.

During the 1980s, BSR manufactured the Rotronics Wafadrive for the ZX Spectrum range of computers.

=== Housewares ===
In the 1970s, BSR diversified by acquiring houseware companies Goblin Vacuum Cleaners (who also made Teasmades), Judge International Housewares Ltd (pots and pans), and Bulpitt & Sons, who made kettles and irons under the "Swan Brand" name. Goblin was sold to US company Shop-Vac in 1984, and Swan was sold to Moulinex of France in 1988.

== Fate ==
After producing their last turntable in 1985, BSR McDonald closed all divisions except for Astec Power Supply; they maintained investments in entities including dbx and X10 (another partnership with Pico Electronics). dbx is now owned by Harman International Industries. BSR later moved its headquarters to Hong Kong, as Astec (BSR) plc, and continued there until 1998, when Astec (BSR) plc was fully acquired by Emerson Electric Company of the United States.

== Sponsorships and philanthropy ==
BSR became the shirt sponsor of West Bromwich Albion for the 1981/82 season and continued the sponsorship under the Swan brand until 1984..

Daniel McDonald gave an endowment of about £11 million to Cambridge University, which was used to create the McDonald Institute for Archaeological Research; this was said to be one of the largest endowments the university had ever received.

== See also ==
- List of phonograph manufacturers
