= Emerson Electric =

American multinational corporation

Emerson Electric Co.

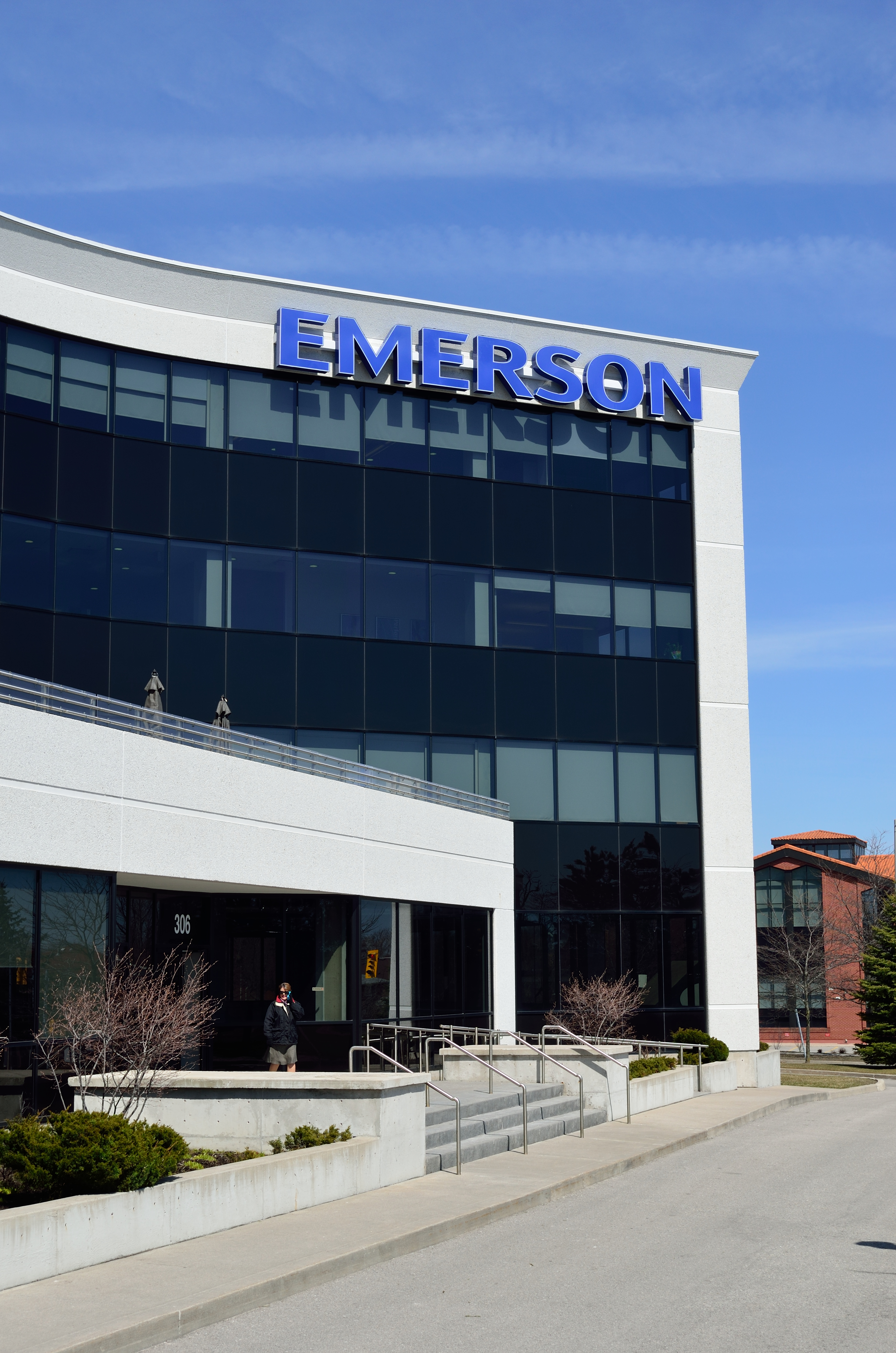
- Emerson campus in Markham, Ontario
- Type: Public
- Traded as: NYSE: EMR; S&P 100 component; S&P 500 component
- Industry: Automation; Electrical equipment
- Predecessor: Emerson Electric Manufacturing Co.
- Founded: September 24, 1890; 136 years ago
- Founder: John W. Emerson
- Headquarters: St. Louis, Missouri, US
- Key people: Jim Turley (chairman); Lal Karsanbhai (CEO); Mike Baughman (CFO)
- Products: Process control systems; Climate and power technologies; Industrial automation; Electrical and electronic equipment; Precision instruments
- Revenue: ▲US$18.02 billion (2025)
- Operating income: ▲US$2.475 billion (2025)
- Net income: ▲US$2.293 billion (2025)
- Total assets: ▼US$41.96 billion (2025)
- Total equity: ▼US$20.28 billion (2025)
- Number of employees: c. 71,000 (2025)
- Subsidiaries: Aspen Technology; Aventics; GE Automation & Controls; National Instruments; Open Systems International
- Website: www.emerson.com

Emerson Electric Co., commonly known as Emerson, is an American multinational corporation headquartered in St. Louis, Missouri. The Fortune 500 company manufactures and delivers a range of industrial automation and control systems, climate control solutions, measurement and analytical instrumentation, and provides engineering services for industrial, commercial, and consumer markets.

== History ==
Emerson was established 1890 in St. Louis, Missouri, as Emerson Electric Manufacturing Co. by Civil War Union veteran John Wesley Emerson to manufacture electric motors using a patent owned by the Scottish-born brothers Charles and Alexander Meston. In 1892, it became the first to sell electric fans in the United States. It expanded its product line to include electric sewing machines, electric dental drills, and power tools.

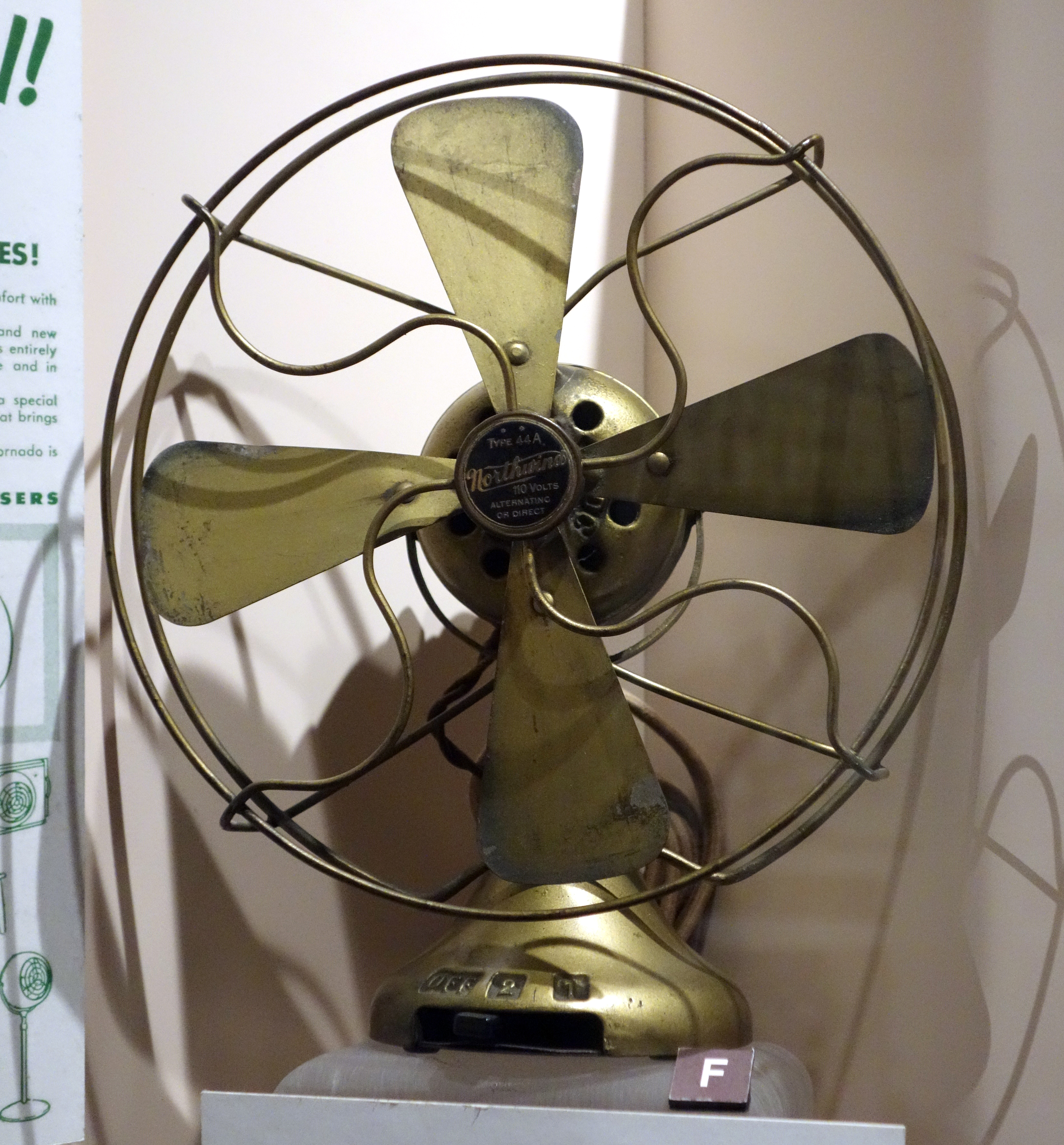
A "Northwind" electric table fan from Emerson, c. 1915, National Museum of American History

During World War II, under the leadership of Stuart Symington, Emerson became the world's largest manufacturer of airplane armament. Emerson ranked 52nd among United States corporations in the value of World War II military production contracts.

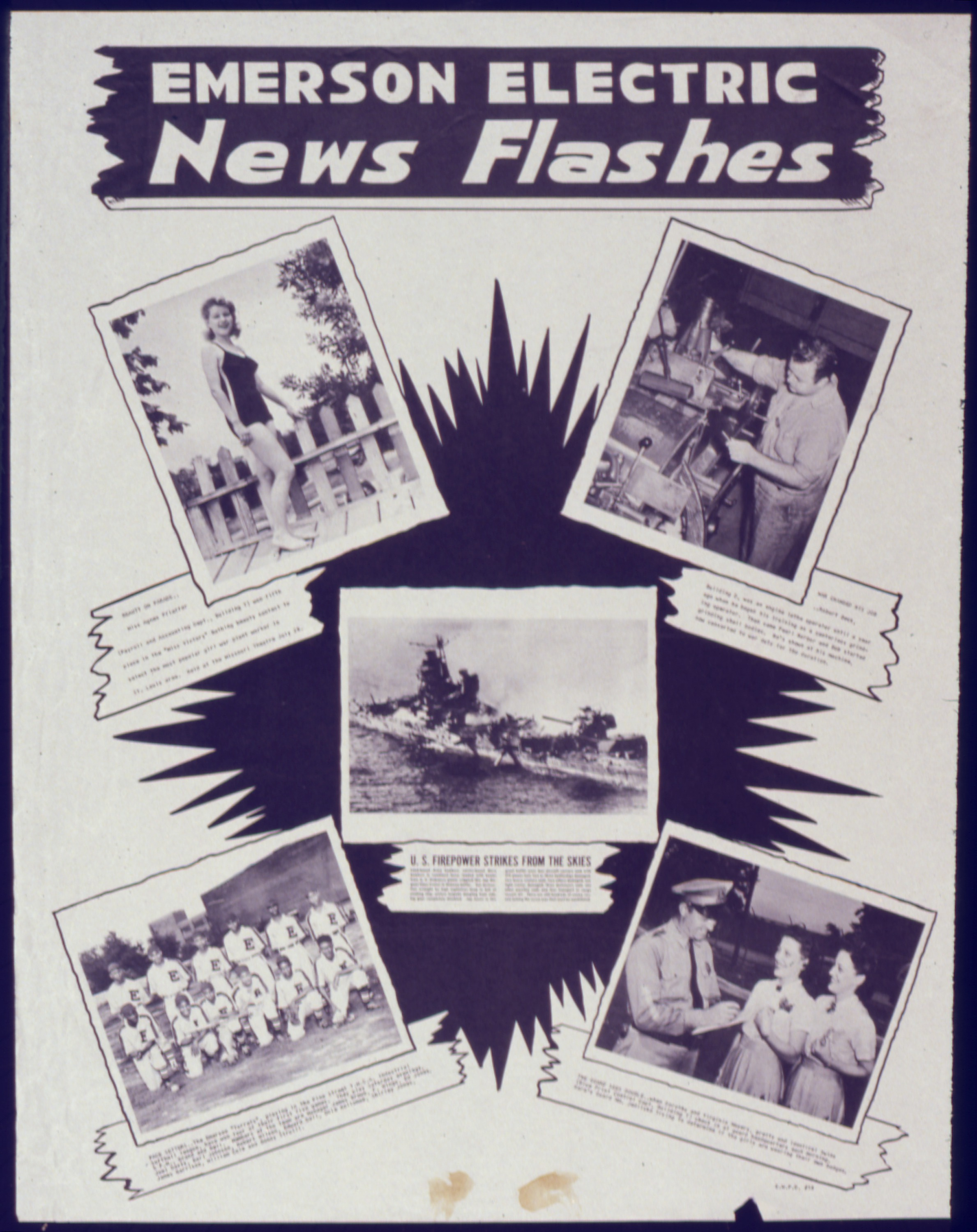
Emerson Electric News Flashes, WWII

== Products ==
=== Automation Solutions ===
Emerson provides advanced process automation, control systems, and software to industries such as oil and gas, power generation, chemicals, pharmaceuticals, and water treatment.

=== Aerospace and Defense Solutions ===
Emerson Electric also plays a significant role in the aerospace and defense industry, producing high-performance avionics equipment. The AN/APQ series of radar systems, which provide advanced targeting and navigation capabilities for military aircraft, are key products in this segment. Notable products include:

- AN/APG-69
- AN/APQ-153
- AN/APQ-157
- AN/APQ-159

== Operations ==
Operating in over 150 countries, Emerson supports industries such as oil and gas, power generation, chemicals, water treatment, and heating, ventilation, and air conditioning systems, aerospace and defense.

== Acquisitions and divestments ==
In 1962, it acquired the United States Electrical Manufacturing Company as the U.S. Electrical Motors Division, including the brand U.S. Motors. In 1968, it acquired the InSinkErator company.

On December 15, 1999, Emerson Electric acquired Jordan Industries Inc.'s telecommunications equipment division for a total of $440 million, expanding it's interest into the telecommunications industry.

In 2010, Emerson sold its U.S. Motors brand to Nidec Corporation, divesting from the electric motors industry.

On December 1, 2016, Platinum Equity acquired Emerson’s Network Power division for more than $4 billion, rebranding the business as Vertiv.

In July 2018, Emerson completed the acquisition of Textron Tools and Test Businesses for a total of $810 million, which included brands such as Greenlee, Klauke, HD Electric, and Sherman + Reilly. This acquisition further expanded Emerson’s offerings in the professional tools and test equipment market.

On April 1, 2020, Emerson acquired American Governor Company, a provider of technologies used to control hydroelectric turbines.

In October 2022, Emerson reached a deal to sell a controlling interest in its climate technologies business to private equity firm Blackstone Inc. for $14 billion, including debt. The remaining shares were purchased by Blackstone Inc. for $3.5 billion in June 2024.

Following a nearly year-long negotiation, in April 2023, Emerson finalized an agreement to acquire National Instruments for $8.2 billion. This acquisition was designed to enhance Emerson’s automation technology capabilities, adding advanced testing and measurement technologies.

== Corporate ==
Key leadership in the mid-20th century includes W.R. Persons, who focused on diversification and expansion from 1954 to 1973, followed by Charles Knight, under whom Emerson pursued aggressive acquisitions and global growth between 1973 and 2000. David Farr, who was CEO from 2000 to 2021, continued to expand the company's reach into international markets and advanced technology sectors. Jim Turley is the chairman, and Lal Karsanbhai is CEO.

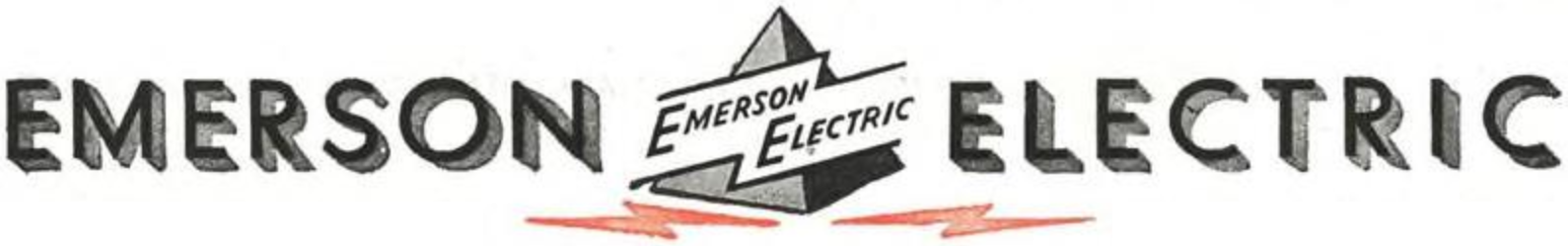
Emerson logo in 1945

== Corporate relationships ==
=== Emerson's brands acquisitions ===
On December 22, 2014, Emerson announced the acquisition of Scotland-based Cascade Technologies Ltd., expanding its gas-analysis portfolio with laser-based measurement analyzers and systems for enhanced industrial emissions monitoring, production efficiencies, and regulatory compliance. Other main Emerson acquisitions and brands include:

- Advanced Protection Technologies
- AgileOps
- AMS Suite
- American Governor Company
- Aperture
- APM Automation Solutions
- Alco Controls
- Appleton Group (formerly EGS Electrical Group)
- Artesyn (spun off on Jan 2014)
- ASCO International (sold to Schneider Electric in 2017)
- ASCO Numatics
- Aspentech
- Astec (spun off on Jan 2014)
- Aventics
- Avocent
- Avtron Loadbank
- Bettis
- Branson
- Bristol Babcock
- Cascade Technologies Ltd
- Chloride Group
- Chromalox (sold to JPMorgan Partners in 2003)
- Closet Maid (sold to Griffon Corp in late 2017)
- Control Products
- Control Techniques (sold to Nidec in early 2017)
- Cooper-Atkins
- Copeland (sold to Blackstone in early 2023)
- CSI Technologies
- DeltaV
- Dixell
- Electronic Navigation Industries
- Enardo LLC
- Energy Systems
- Firetrol
- Fisher Regulators
- Fisher Valves & Instruments
- Flexim
- Fusite (sold to One Rock in 2022)
- GeoFields
- Greenlee
- Groveley Detection Ltd
- InSinkErator (sold to Whirlpool Corporation in 2022)
- Intelligent Store
- Islatrol
- Knurr (a business of Vertiv now)
- Leroy-Somer (sold to Nidec in early 2017)
- Liebert Corporation (now a brand under Vertiv)
- METCO
- Metro (InterMetro Industries)
- Micro Motion
- Mimic
- Mobrey
- National Instruments
- Open Systems International
- Ovation
- Paine Electronics
- Paradig
- Penberthy
- Pentair Valves & Controls
- Permasense
- Plantweb Optics
- Power Transmission Solutions
- Progea Group
- ProSys, Inc.
- ProTeam
- Pryne & Co., Inc.
- Ridgid (Ridge Tool Company)
- Rosemount
- Rosemount Analytical
- Roxar
- Saab Marine Electronics
- Sensi (Part of Copeland)
- Spence and Nicholson
- SSB Wind Systems (sold to Nidec in early 2017)
- Surge Protection
- Syncade
- TopWorx
- Tescom
- Therm-O-Disc (sold to One Rock in 2022)
- Universal Western Electric Co. (1960)
- Verdant
- Vilter
- White-Rodgers
- WORKSHOP
- Zedi

== Controversies ==
=== NBC Heroes lawsuit ===
On October 2, 2006, Emerson filed suit in federal court against NBC regarding a scene that appeared in the pilot episode of the network's TV series Heroes. The scene depicted Claire Bennet reaching into an active garbage disposal, severely injuring her hand. Emerson's suit claims the scene "casts the disposer in an unsavory light, irreparably tarnishing the product" by suggesting that serious injuries will result "in the event consumers were to accidentally insert their hand into one".

Emerson asked for a ruling barring future broadcasts of the pilot and to block NBC from using any Emerson trademarks in the future.

On February 23, 2007, the case was dropped. NBC Universal and Emerson Electric settled the lawsuit outside of court.
