= Aventics =

Manufacturer of pneumatic components and systems

- Company type: S.à r.l
- Industry: Mechanical engineering
- Founded: 2013–2014
- Headquarters: Laatzen
- Revenue: approx. 400 Mio €
- Number of employees: 2,100
- Website: www.aventics.com

Aventics is a manufacturer of pneumatic components and systems with facilities in Laatzen, Germany; Bonneville, France; Lexington, United States; Eger, Hungary; and Changzhou, China. The Lexington pneumatics facility manufactures pneumatic valves, pneumatic cylinders, directional control valves, pressure control valves, electro-pneumatic valves, solenoid valves, pneumatic fittings, flow controls, actuators, marine propulsion controls and more.

== Background ==
The company was formed in 2013 through the divestment of the pneumatics division of the Bosch Rexroth. In December 2013, it was sold to the financial investor Triton Partners and traded as Aventics from February 2014 until the Emerson purchase in July 2018.

Pneumatics uses compressed air as a drive medium. The company manufactures cylinders, valves, valve systems, as well as units for compressed air preparation and is increasingly focusing on electronic networking of system parts. Vacuum technology for non-contact transport systems, such as those used in the food industry is an additional division.

== History ==
The current company can be traced back to the Westinghouse Air Brake Company (WABCO) founded in 1869. WABCO pneumatics business was then taken over in 1989 by Rexroth, at the time a subsidiary of the Mannesmann Group. As a result, Mannesmann Rexroth Pneumatik was founded with its headquarters in Hanover, Germany. In 1991, Mannesmann Rexroth took over AB Mecman (founded in 1945), which was assigned to the pneumatics division and renamed Rexroth Mecman GmbH. After Bosch purchased Rexroth in 2001, Bosch Automation and Mannesmann Rexroth (parent of Rexroth Mecman) were merged to form today's Bosch Rexroth. The pneumatics division was divested in September 2013 as a standalone company under the name Rexroth Pneumatics and then sold to the financial investor Triton. Since then, the company has been trading under the name Aventics . At the beginning of 2016, the inverted tooth chain division was sold to Renold, a British drive and conveyor chain specialist. The acquisition of Vector Horizon Technology (VHtek), located in Bowling Green, Kentucky, was announced in March 2017. VHtek develops clean energy systems with a focus on emission control and advanced mechatronic devices.

In July 2018, the acquisition by Emerson, a global leader in smart pneumatics technologies that power machine and factory automation applications, was announced.
