= Roxar AS =

Norwegian oil and gas provider

- Company type: Private
- Industry: Oil & Gas
- Founded: 1984
- Headquarters: Stavanger, Norway
- Area served: Global
- Parent: Emerson Electric
- Website: http://www.emerson.com/roxar

Roxar AS was a provider of products and associated services for reservoir management and production optimisation in the upstream oil and gas industry. Roxar was headquartered in Stavanger, Norway and operated in 19 countries with around 900 employees. Roxar offered software for reservoir interpretation, modelling and simulation, as well as instrumentation for well planning, monitoring, metering and production optimisation. Roxar was acquired by Emerson Electric Company in April 2009.

Roxar developed real-time multiphase flow measurement and instrumentation of wells and data acquisition systems.

== History ==
Roxar was formed in 1999 as a result of a merger between Multi-Fluid ASA and Smedvig Technologies AS.

1984 - Smedvig International Petroleum Research Group AS (IPR) is established. The company develops technical solutions within drilling and production.

1987 - Smedvig IPR establishes Permanent Downhole Monitoring Systems (PDMS) in a 50/50 joint venture with Lasalle Pressure Data Services Ltd. Smedvig IPR Services AS is established.

1991 – Smedvig IPR becomes the sole owner of the PDMS business. Smedvig IPR AS buys 30 percent of the shares in IPAC AS, a software company specialising in advanced software for stochastic modelling of reservoirs.

1991 - First CorrOcean subsea sensor is installed on the Norwegian Continental Shelf

1992 – Multi-Fluid launches the MFI WaterCut Meter. Smedvig IPR AS participates in the formation of Petec AS, a reservoir consulting company.

1993 – Petec AS participates in the formation of Odin AS, a software company specialising in advanced software for stochastic modelling of reservoirs. Smedvig IPR AS merges with Smedvig IPR Services AS and becomes Smedvig Technology AS.

1994 –Smedvig Technology AS acquires the remaining shares in IPAC AS and acquires PTL Tønsberg AS, an electronics company specialised in integrated hybrid circuitry.

1995 – Smedvig Technology AS acquires 100 percent of the shares in Petec AS and Geomatic AS, a company specialising in the 3D reservoir modelling software IRAP RMS. Smedvig Offshore acquires Prodrill Ltd, a drilling consultancy business in the UK, and the management of this company is taken over by Smedvig Technology AS.

1996 –Smedvig Technology AS acquires 49 percent of the shares in Onics, a reservoir consulting company in Moscow. Smedvig Technology AS acquires 100 percent of the shares in Odin AS.

1997 –Smedvig Technology AS becomes Smedvig Technologies (Holding) AS with full ownership of Geomatic AS (former Petec, Geomatic and Ipac). Multi-Fluid is listed on the Oslo Stock Exchange.

1998 – Smedvig Technologies (Holding) AS and Multi-Fluid ASA launch a co-operation to develop a downhole water-cut meter. Multi-Fluid introduces the first subsea multiphase meter.

1999 – Smedvig Technologies (Holding) AS merges with Multi-Fluid ASA and becomes Roxar ASA, a public company quoted on the Oslo Stock Exchange, specialising in reservoir modelling software, PDMS and multiphase metering.

2001 – Roxar ASA acquires Fluenta AS, a company specialising in multiphase meters, flare gas meters and sand monitoring.

2003 – The two major investors in Roxar ASA, Lime Rock Partners LP of the US and Smedvig AS of Norway acquire control of Roxar ASA and the company is delisted.

2004 – Roxar AS establishes a branch office in Moscow and acquires full ownership of Onics in Russia.

2006 – Arcapita, a private equity firm completes acquisition of Roxar. Roxar acquires EnergyScitech, a UK-based independent consultancy and software development company.

2007 – CorrOcean acquires oil service company Mareco AS and adds complementary products for chemical and MEG/Methanol injection to its Subsea portfolio.

2007 - Roxar is acquired by CorrOcean ASA (est. 1979) and following the merger the company is listed at the Oslo Stock Exchange as Roxar ASA.

2009 - Roxar is acquired by Emerson, St. Louis USA and becomes part of a US$28 billion company.

== See also ==
- Schlumberger
- Halliburton
- Emerson Electric Company
- FMC
- Cameron International Corporation
