= Ultrasonic/sonic driller/corer =

The Ultrasonic/Sonic Driller/Corer (USDC) is a drilling device that uses vibrations in order to hammer its bit through materials, as opposed to traditional drilling methods. The drill uses a piezoelectric actuator as its source of power, and a variety of 'horns' to vibrate, or hammer, its bit through the material. A prototype of the drill was first released by NASA in April 2000, which weighed 1.5 pounds (0.68 kg) and had the capacity to drill half-inch holes into granite using only 10 watts of power, whereas the modern household half-inch drill requires 750 watts. The USDC was originally designed to be able to drill through very rigid rock surfaces that would otherwise be damaged by a rotary drill, but has also shown potential usefulness to the field of medicine. It is the specific characteristics of the drill that make it ideal or practical for certain situations.

== How it works ==
The USDC is driven by a Piezoelectric stack actuator that creates the vibrations. The actuator vibrates at an extremely high frequency, making it ultrasonic, and it is these waves of vibration that are transmitted by the horn of the actuator all the way to the bit itself. The vibrations are created at the actuator and are transferred by the horn to a free mass. The free mass vibrates between the drill stem and the horn of the actuator to transmit the vibrations down the drill stem. The drill stem houses the drill bit, and the vibrations push the bit into the material. The repetitive impact on the drill stem by the free mass, creates stress pulses that transmit to the tip of the bit and into the rock. Ultimately, the repetitive strike of the bit produces enough strain on the surface to fracture it.

=== Horn structures ===
There are four primary styles of horns, those being:

- conical-straight horn - a cone shaped horn coming to a cylindrical point
- conical horn - a cone shaped horn, but not coming to a point
- step horn - two stacked cylinders, the second being smaller than the first
- exponential horn -a cone shaped horn that comes to a point

== History ==
NASA originally developed a prototype of the USDC in 2000, which weighed in at 1.5 pounds, or .7 kilograms. NASA has not discussed further development of the drill, but has mentioned that the drill could be downsized even further to fit in the palm of a hand. A second drill was developed to fit onto the Sojourner Rover, which had a drill head that weighed in at one pound alone, or .4 kilograms.

== Current uses ==
The USDC was originally designed by NASA to bore through rock. The drill has been equipped on both of the Mars rovers to collect samples and take. However, plans to expand the USCD's space uses include collecting samples from meteorites. The USDC is not limited to merely drilling and collecting samples, as the drill can be equipped side-by-side with sensors to take readings under the surface.

For preparing samples in TEM observation, such as silicon wafers, an USDC is used to cut specimens fitting the TEM holder (3 mm diameter).

== Possible uses ==
Use for the USDC has been foreseen in the medical field, for delicate surgeries or procedures involving the human skeletal structure. Operations involving the heart cannot involve high force, which could damage the organ or surrounding rib cage. The USDC's low axial load ensures that little to no damage would be done to these fragile areas. The drill has also seen possibilities to excavate wire leads for pacemakers

== Benefits ==
=== Low power usage ===
Overall, the USDC requires little power to operate. The USDC requires a very low axial load, or downward force applied, to be able to drill through tough surfaces such as granite, rock, or ice. Near zero torque is needed to operate the drill, as it does not bore using a traditional rotary force. Comparatively, the USDC uses much less power to operate than other drill boring through hard surfaces.

=== Remoteness ===
Because of the low-axial load and negligible required torque, it is practical to use an ultrasonic drill for boring purposes where human operation cannot be present. The drill is able to properly function at both extremely low and high temperatures.

== Drawbacks ==
=== Slurry distribution ===
Due to the design of most ultrasonic drills, it is difficult to drill much past an inch into very dense material. This is because of the lack of slurry, or cutting fluid, to reach the drill bit in order to keep it clean and effective. Rotational drills do not experience this phenomenon as much due to the slotted cutting bit, which allows access of cutting fluid to the tip of the bit. Ultrasonic drilling provides very little tolerance surrounding the bit, and so no such pathway is created.
