= Dispatcher training simulator =

A dispatcher training simulator (DTS), also known as an operator training simulator (OTS), is a computer-based training system for operators (known as dispatchers) of electrical power grids. It performs this role by simulating the behaviour of the electrical network forming the power system under various operating conditions, and its response to actions by the dispatchers. Student dispatchers may therefore develop their skills from exposure not only to routine operations but also to adverse operational situations without compromising the security of supply on a real transmission system.

== Description ==
Early simulations modelled the transmission system with banks of analog computers linked by scaled-down representations of the interconnecting lines. The operator would simulate the operation of circuit breakers by physically operating their miniature replicas. As transmission systems grew in size and complexity, they could no longer be adequately represented in this manner, and computerised simulations came to the fore.

A modern DTS combines or simulates the following elements:

- An energy management system (EMS): a computer system for controlling a power grid. The EMS enables remote operation of electrical equipment, such as circuit breakers or transformers. It also receives information transmitted back to an electricity control centre, such as the status of equipment or notification of alarms. The user interface typically displays the state of the transmission system on computerised one-line diagrams with controllable points for simulated operation of plant such as circuit breakers or transformer tap-changers.
- A SCADA (Supervisory control and data acquisition) system, which provides collection and assimilation of data from substations and transmits operator instructions back to the same plant.
- A load-flow study to calculate power flows and voltages on the transmission system and to model its responses to disturbances such as line trips, relay action, and generator-demand mismatch. The model will normally extend to the limits of the system operator's region of interest, and include representations of plant such as lines, generators, transformers, circuit breakers and capacitors. Optionally the subtransient behaviour of the system can also be modelled.
- The system may additionally provide facilities for modelling and optimising the economic dispatch of generating units. Any generation's dynamic characteristics and limits, in particular its voltage regulation, maximum generation, and rate of change of output are usually incorporated.

== Operation ==
A DTS is frequently purchased by a customer (such as a transmission system operator) at the same time and from the same manufacturer as an energy management system, and is usually designed to mimic it as closely as possible. Operational scenarios are created on the DTS to represent the operator's transmission system under a variety of conditions. These may represent normal operating conditions, or be specially designed to test the student's responses to adverse circumstances, such as frequent line trips during severe weather. The DTS is administered by a team of instructors, who select scenarios and simulate operational events, monitoring the trainee's actions in response.

Scenarios may also represent circumstances that the system operator hopes never occur, such as complete system shut-down, and allow it to develop strategies for restoration of service (known as black start).

Deficiencies in operator training were identified as a contributory cause of the 2003 North American blackout, a factor similarly connected to earlier power failures. The joint US-Canadian task force investigating the incident recommended mandatory periods of simulation time for operators, and validation of the models against actual system characteristics.

To enable the training simulator to respond as realistically as possible to the student's actions, the power flow study at its heart must run on a frequent time basis, such as every few seconds. The simulation may model electrical networks consisting of many thousands of nodes and containing several hundred generating units.
