= Charles F. Knight =

American business executive

Charles F. Knight (January 20, 1936 – September 12, 2017) was an American business executive. He was chairman emeritus of Emerson Electric Co.

== Biography ==
=== Early life ===
Charles F. Knight was born in Winnetka, Illinois in 1936. He graduated from Cornell University in 1957 and was elected to the Sphinx Head Society. He went on to earn his MBA from Cornell in 1959.

=== Career ===
He served as Chairman of Emerson Electric from 1974 to 2004 and as chief executive officer from 1973 to 2000. He also served as president from 1986 to 1988 and from 1995 to 1997 and was a director of Emerson from 1972 to 2004. He has sat on the Boards of Directors of Anheuser-Busch Companies, Inc., AT&T Inc., BP plc and Morgan Stanley. He became a director of IBM in 1993.

=== Personal life ===
A Republican, Knight supported John Ashcroft, George W. Bush, Rudy Giuliani, Roy Blunt, John McCain, and Mitt Romney. He was inducted into Junior Achievement's U.S. Business Hall of Fame in 2000. The Charles F. Knight Executive Education & Conference Center at Washington University in St. Louis is named for him, as is the Charles F. Knight Emergency & Trauma Center, which serves as the main trauma center and emergency department for the Washington University Medical Center/Barnes-Jewish Hospital complex.

He died from complications of Alzheimer's disease on September 12, 2017.

== Bibliography ==
- Performance Without Compromise: How Emerson Consistently Achieves Winning Results (2005)
