= Chromalox, Inc. =

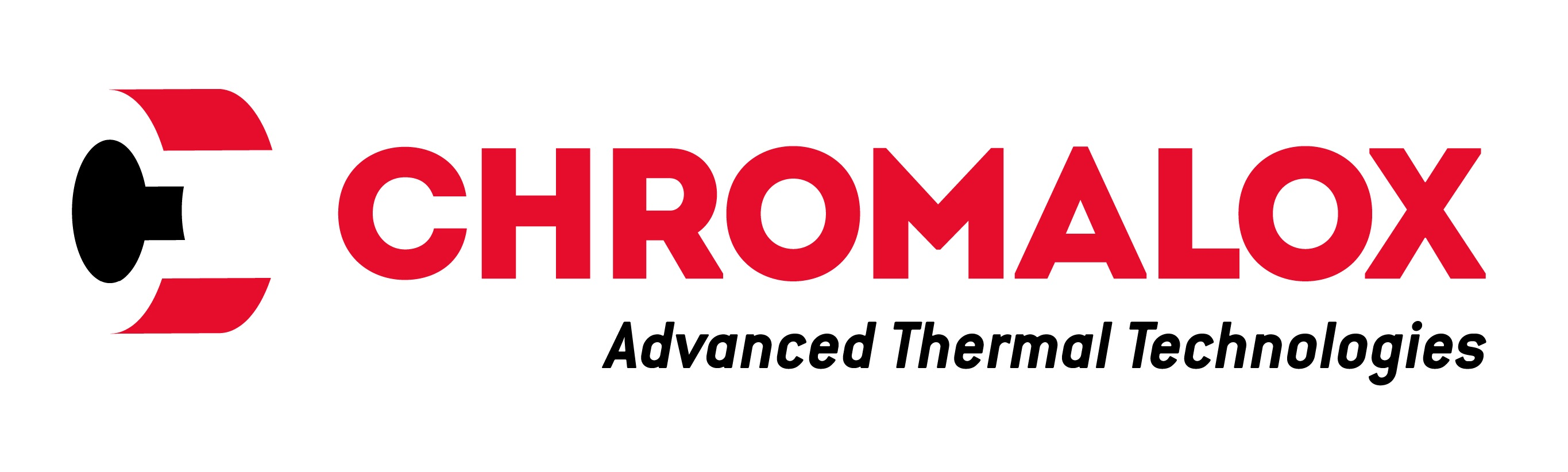
- Type: Private
- Founded: 1917; 109 years ago Pittsburgh, Pennsylvania
- Headquarters: Pittsburgh, Pennsylvania
- Key people: Armando Pazos, President; William Croyle, VP Finance; Lois Crandedl V.P., Operations;
- Products: Industrial heaters, temperature control products, heat tracing products, packaged heating systems.
- Website: www.chromalox.com

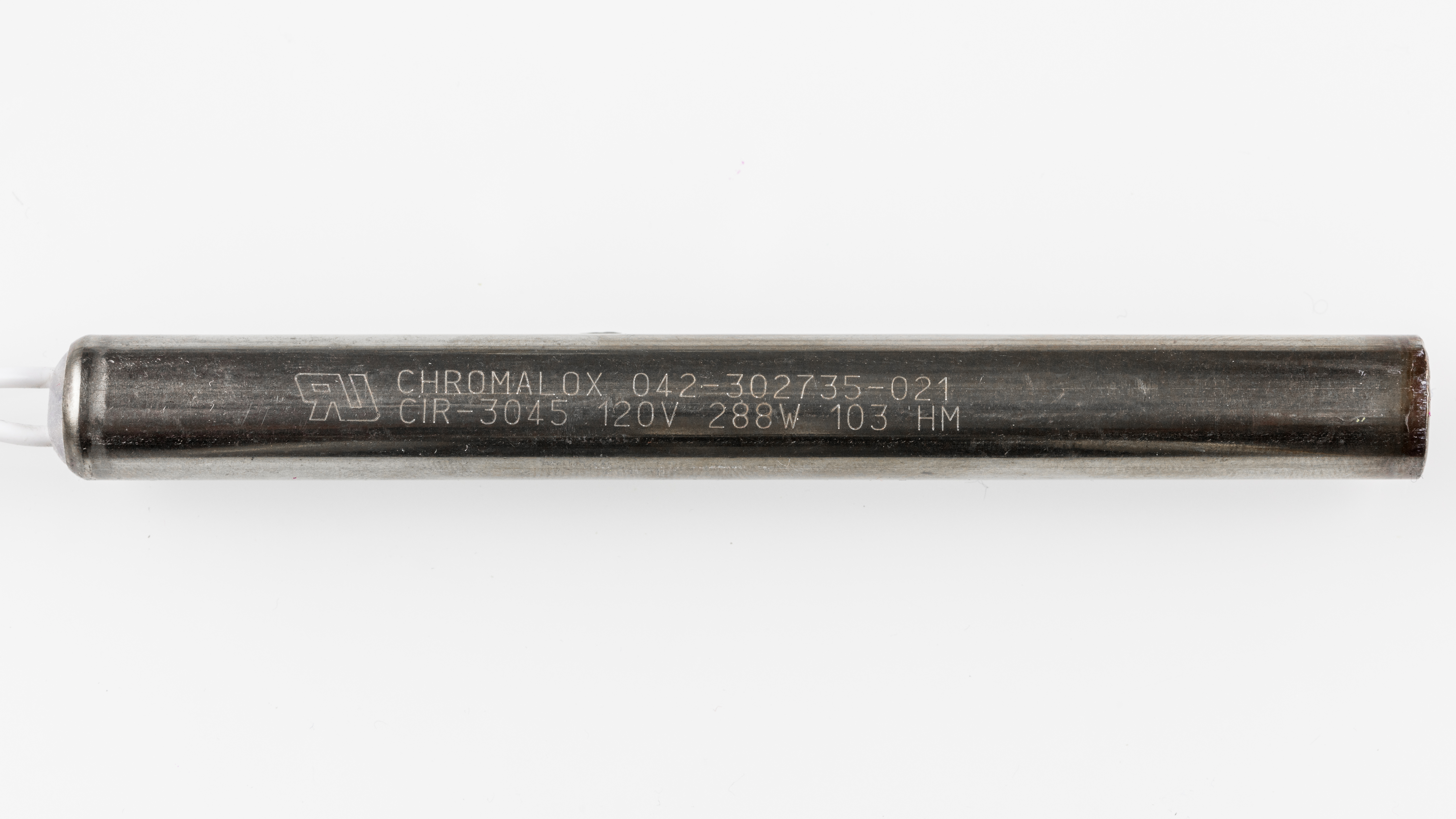
Cartridge heater from inside a solid ink printer

Chromalox, Inc. manufactures and supplies electric heat and control products for industrial heating applications in the U.S. and internationally. Based in Pittsburgh, Pennsylvania, the company has manufacturing facilities in Ogden, Utah; La Vergne, Tennessee; Nuevo Laredo, Mexico; and Soissons, France. Chromalox also provides engineering and sales expertise, as well as warehousing throughout North America, Europe and Asia. Sales and service are provided through sales representatives and distributors globally.

== Overview ==
The company serves a wide variety of industries, including alternative fuels, biopharmaceuticals, chemical processing, commercial food equipment, laboratory and analytical, marine, medical equipment, nuclear energy and power generation, petrochemical, oil and gas, solar energy, transportation and wastewater treatment. It provides industrial heaters, temperature control products, heat tracing products and packaged heating systems that include heat transfer and vaporizer systems, large tank heating systems, boilers and steam generators, air handlers and load banks.

== History ==
The company traces its origin to 1915 when a Pittsburgh engineer, Edwin L. Wiegand, received a patent for a resistance heating element embedded in an insulated refractory enclosed in a metal sheath. This electric heating method would eventually be applied to home cooking and heating as well as manufacturing processes. Chromalox incorporated in 1917, with the company's first order for a strip heater used in a product that became the modern household clothes iron. The product had the word "chrome" stamped on the strip heater and used a cement mix to "lock" in the heating element, hence the name "Chromalox."

The company continued to grow and developed a Pittsburgh manufacturing presence in the 1920s, developing new industrial heating products and processes. It expanded into the nuclear industry in the 1950s, supplying pressurizer heaters. Chromalox was also a supplier to the aerospace support industry in the 1960s, with a Chromalox strip heater included on the first Apollo Lunar Module.

Chromalox expanded into global markets by acquiring two manufacturing facilities, Grimwood in England, and Etirex in France. In 1977, Chromalox Industrial Controls was born with the purchase of Rosemount Temperature Controls in LaVergne, TN. The controls product lines were diversified and expanded, positioning Chromalox as a leader in the industry. International manufacturing acquisitions continued in the 1990s, and a Hong Kong regional sales office was added in 1993 to service Asian markets.

== Acquisition ==
The company was acquired by Sentinel Capital Partners from CCMP, a division of J. P. Morgan Partners, on April 14, 2011.

The company was acquired by Spirax-Sarco Engineering on May 26, 2017.
