= Energy management system (electrical grid) =

Tools for managing electric utility grids

An energy management system (EMS) is a system of computer-aided tools used by operators of electric utility grids to monitor, control, and optimize the performance of the generation or transmission system. Also, it can be used in small scale systems like microgrids.

== Terminology ==
The computer technology is also referred to as SCADA/EMS or EMS/SCADA. In these respects, the terminology EMS then excludes the monitoring and control functions, but more specifically refers to the collective suite of power network applications and to the generation control and scheduling applications.

Manufacturers of EMS also commonly supply a corresponding dispatcher training simulator (DTS). This related technology makes use of components of SCADA and EMS as a training tool for control center operators.

== Operating systems ==
Up to the early 1990s it was common to find EMS systems being delivered based on proprietary hardware and operating systems. Back then EMS suppliers such as Harris Controls (now GE), Hitachi, Cebyc, Control Data Corporation, Siemens and Toshiba manufactured their own proprietary hardware. EMS suppliers that did not manufacture their own hardware often relied on products developed by Digital Equipment, Gould Electronics and MODCOMP. The VAX 11/780 from Digital Equipment was a popular choice amongst some EMS suppliers. EMS systems now rely on a model based approach. Traditional planning models and EMS models were always independently maintained and seldom in synchronism with each other. Using EMS software allows planners and operators to share a common model reducing the mismatch between the two and cutting model maintenance by half. Having a common user interface also allows for easier transition of information from planning to operations.

As proprietary systems became uneconomical, EMS suppliers began to deliver solutions based on industry standard hardware platforms such as those from Digital Equipment (later Compaq, then HP), IBM and Sun. The common operating system then was either DEC OpenVMS or Unix. By 2004, various EMS suppliers including Alstom, ABB and OSI had begun to offer Windows based solutions. By 2006 customers had a choice of UNIX, Linux or Windows-based systems. Some suppliers including ETAP, NARI, PSI-CNI and Siemens continue to offer UNIX-based solutions. It is now common for suppliers to integrate UNIX-based solutions on either the Sun Solaris or IBM platform. Newer EMS systems based on blade servers occupy a fraction of the space previously required. For instance, a blade rack of 20 servers occupy much the same space as that previously occupied by a single MicroVAX server.

== See also ==
- Energy storage as a service (ESaaS)
- Load management for balancing the supply of electricity on a distribution network.
