= Type K =

Type K may refer to:

- Type K thermocouple
- Type K Star
- Type K power plugs and sockets, used in Denmark
