= CEE 7 =

European electric plug standards

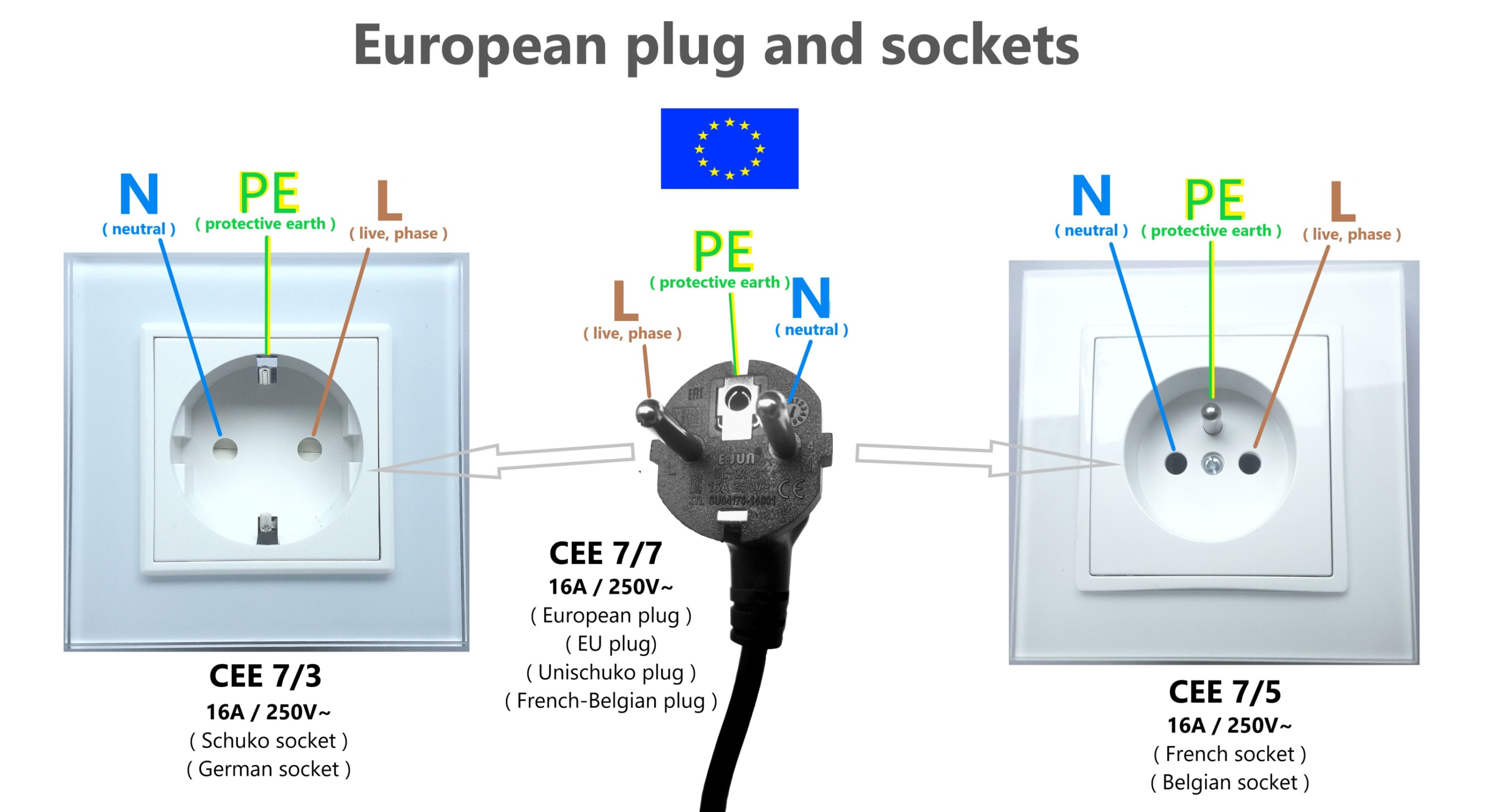
The CEE 7/7 plug shown here (middle) is the shape-based intersection of two previously incompatible connectors. It made it possible to largely unify the European market without replacing a single socket, because it no longer matters whether the sockets provide grounding clips (CEE 7/3, left) or a grounding pin (CEE 7/5, right).

CEE 7 is a standard for alternating-current (AC) plugs and sockets for household and similar purposes. First published in 1951 by the former International Commission on the Rules for the Approval of Electrical Equipment (IECEE), it unified standards produced by several continental European countries. The project resulted in a list and numbered group of power connecter systems.

Interactive 3D model of a CEE 7/7 plug compatible with Type E and Type F sockets.

In Europe, CEE 7 connectors are the sole standardised system in use (and therefore often referred to as "European plugs/sockets") with the exceptions of Italy (with San Marino), Denmark (including the Faroe Islands), Great Britain (including Gibraltar) with Ireland, Malta and Cyprus, and Switzerland (including Liechtenstein), each of which use their own systems. CEE 7 is also the sole system in many other countries outside the region such as Indonesia, Iran, Egypt, DR Congo, Morocco, Madagascar and South Korea.

== Background ==
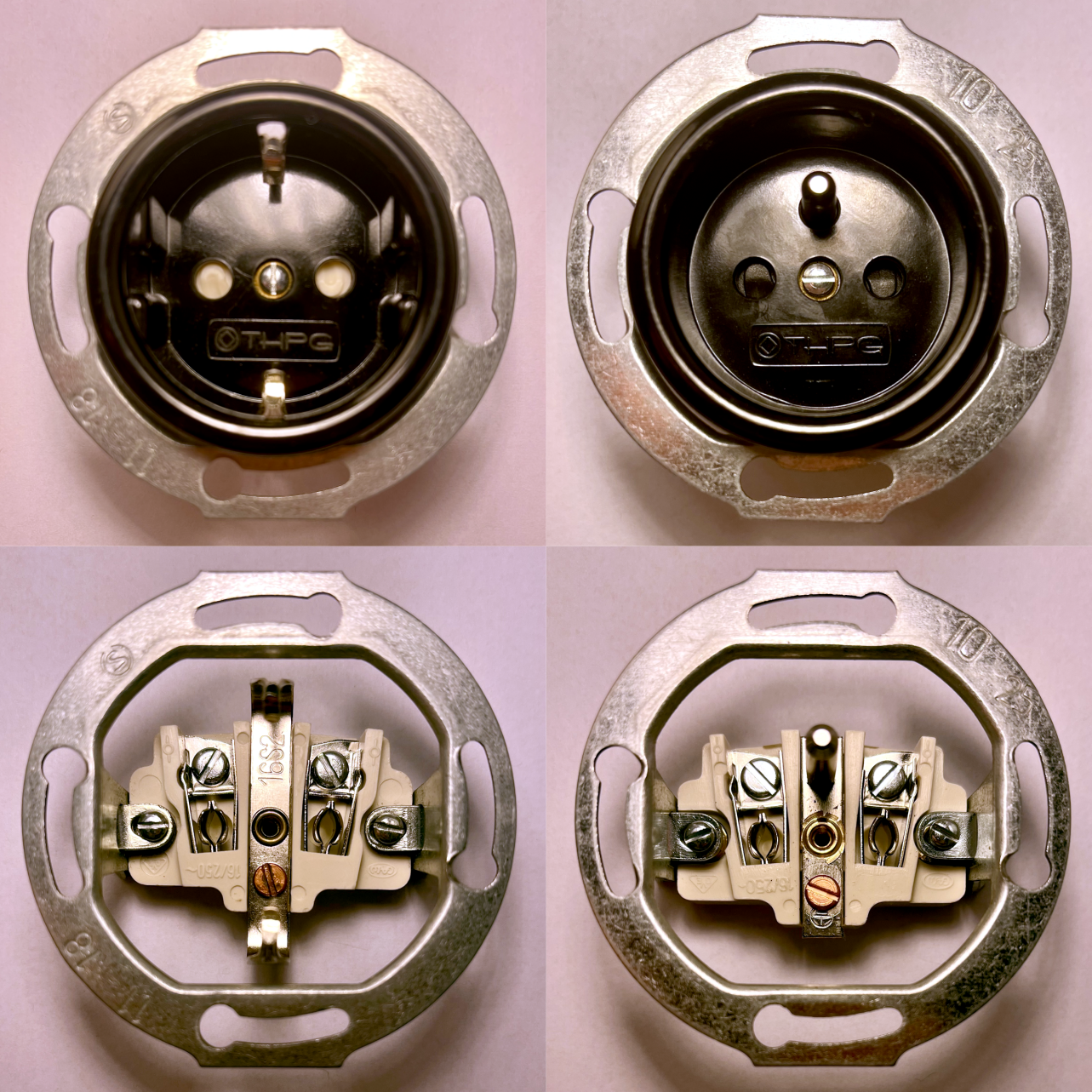
Comparison of a CEE 7/3 (left) and CEE 7/5 (right) socket from the same manufacturer. The top shows them with the centre cover in place, the bottom without it. One can see that the two sockets are identical internally apart from the grounding contact.

The International Commission on the Rules for the Approval of Electrical Equipment (IECEE) was a standards body which published Specification for plugs and socket-outlets for domestic and similar purposes as CEE Publication 7, known simply as CEE 7. It was originally published in 1951, the 2nd edition was published in May 1963 and was last updated by Modification 4 in March 1983. It remains available from the IEC, which states that "this standard shall not be used alone, it is to be used in addition to IEC 60884-1". CEE 7 consists of general specifications, plus a number of standard sheets for specific connectors.

A number of standards based on two round pins with centres spaced at 19 mm are in use in continental Europe and elsewhere, most of which are listed in IEC/TR 60083 "Plugs and socket-outlets for domestic and similar general use standardized in member countries of IEC". There is no European Union regulation of domestic mains plugs and sockets, and the Low Voltage Directive specifically excludes domestic plugs and sockets. EU countries each have their own regulations and national standards; for example, some require child-resistant shutters, while others do not. CE marking is neither applicable nor permitted on plugs and sockets.

== Overview of CEE 7 standards ==
=== Sockets and plugs ===
The following table shows the common socket and plug types according to CEE 7 and puts them in relation to each other.

Socket	Plug	Description	Universal plugs		
Socket	Plug	Description	2.5 A ungrounded	16 A ungrounded	16 A grounded
CEE 7/1	CEE 7/2*	2-pole connector rated 10/16 A 250 V. No protective earth and risk of electric shock due to missing circular recess. Nowadays banned in many countries.	CEE 7/16; Europlug (Type C)	CEE 7/17 "contour plug" – Comes in two shape variants, one that allows symmetrical insertion into Type E sockets (left) and one that does not (right)	CEE 7/1 lacks protective earth and hence should not be used with plugs that require it.
CEE 7/3	CEE 7/4**	Type F or Schuko, patented by Siemens-Schuckertwerke in 1929.	CEE 7/16; Europlug (Type C)	CEE 7/17 "contour plug" – Comes in two shape variants, one that allows symmetrical insertion into Type E sockets (left) and one that does not (right)	CEE 7/7 = Type E+F
CEE 7/5	CEE 7/6**	Type E, likely developed in Belgium around 1930 but never patented, therefore adopted by Czechoslovakia, Poland and France.	CEE 7/16; Europlug (Type C)	CEE 7/17 "contour plug" – Comes in two shape variants, one that allows symmetrical insertion into Type E sockets (left) and one that does not (right)	CEE 7/7 = Type E+F

* The CEE 7/2 plug has now been largely phased out across Europe because it does not fit into any modern sockets and is therefore effectively unusable. This plug has thus been completely replaced by CEE 7/16 (small appliances up to 2.5 A) and CEE 7/17 (larger appliances that do not need to be grounded and consequently do not require CEE 7/7).
** CEE 7/4 and CEE 7/6 plugs have also become less common, as they have mostly been replaced by the universal CEE 7/7 that fits both CEE 7/3 and CEE 7/5 sockets.

=== Cross-compatibility ===
CEE 7 plug-socket compatibilty chart
Plug	Socket		
Plug	CEE 7/1 (unearthed)	CEE 7/3 (Schuko)	CEE 7/5 (French)
CEE 7/2 unearthed	Yes	No	
CEE 7/4 "Schuko" (Type F)	Yes		No
CEE 7/6 French/Belgian (Type E)	Yes	No	Yes
CEE 7/7 hybrid (Type E+F)	Yes		
CEE 7/16 "Europlug" (Type C)	Yes		
CEE 7/17 "contour"	Yes		

== CEE 7/1 unearthed socket and CEE 7/2 unearthed plug ==
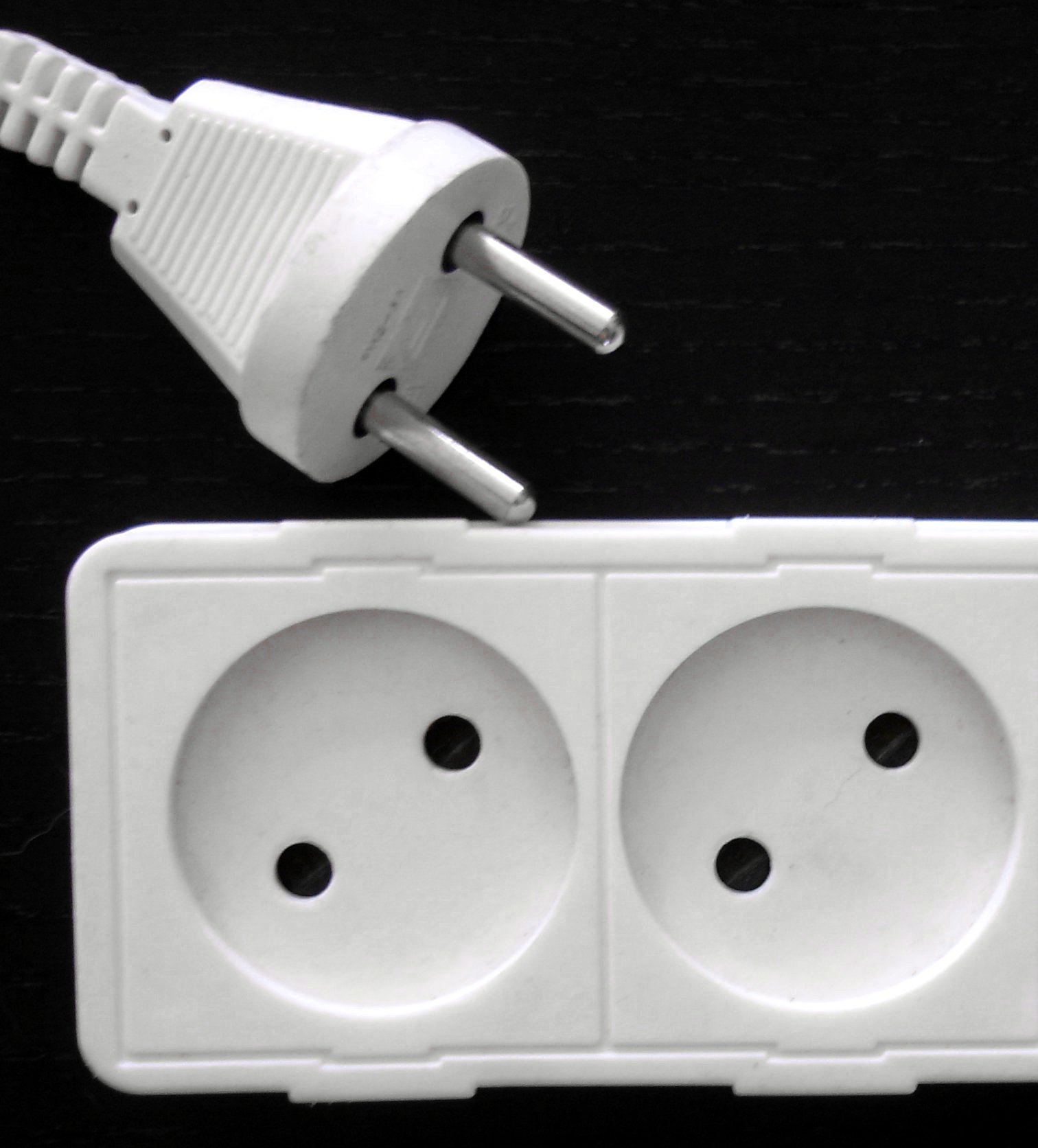
CEE 7/1 socket, accepts CEE 7/2 (unearthed) plug and also CEE 7/4, CEE 7/6 and CEE 7/7 (earthed) plugs

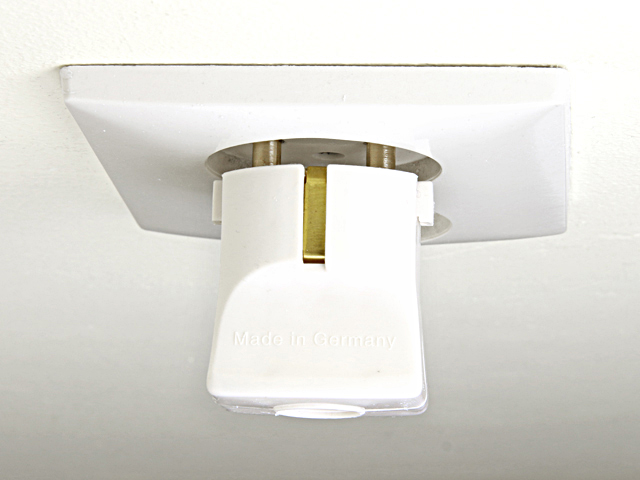
CEE 7/4 plug partially inserted in CEE 7/1 non-earthed socket, pins are in contact but exposed. There is no connection for the earthing contact

CEE 7/1 unearthed sockets are designed to accept CEE 7/2 round plugs without notches in the body and having 4.8 by 19 mm (0.189 by 0.748 in) pins.

Because they have no earth connections they have been or are being phased out in most countries. The regulations of countries using the CEE 7/3 and CEE 7/5 socket standards vary in whether CEE 7/1 sockets are still permitted in environments where the need for earthing is less critical. Sweden, for example, prohibited them from new installations in 1994. In Germany, unearthed sockets are rare, whereas in the Netherlands and Sweden it is still common to find them in "dry areas" such as in bedrooms or living rooms. Some countries prohibit use of unearthed and earthed sockets in the same room, in the "insulated room" concept, so that people cannot touch an earthed object and one that has become live, at the same time.

The depth of the sockets varies between countries and age. Older sockets are so shallow that it is possible to touch the pins of a plug when the plug is inserted only deep enough to get electrical power on the pins, while newer sockets are deep enough to protect from this kind of accident. CEE 7/1 sockets accept CEE 7/4, CEE 7/6, and CEE 7/7 plugs without providing an earth connection. The earthed CEE 7/3 and CEE 7/5 sockets were specifically designed not to allow insertion of CEE 7/2 unearthed round plugs fitted to older appliances which had to be earthed via other means.

== CEE 7/3 socket and CEE 7/4 plug (German "Schuko"; Type F) ==
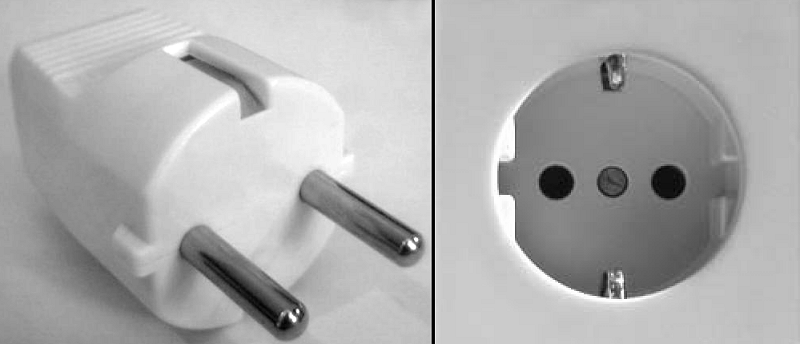
Schuko plug (CEE 7/4) and socket (CEE 7/3)

The CEE 7/3 socket and CEE 7/4 plug are commonly called Schuko. The socket (which is often, in error, also referred to as CEE 7/4) has a predominantly circular recess which is 17.5 mm (0.689 in) deep with two symmetrical round apertures and two earthing clips on the sides of the socket positioned to ensure that the earth is always engaged before live pin contact is made. The plug pins are 4.8 by 19 mm (0.189 by 0.748 in). The Schuko connection system is symmetrical and unpolarised in its design, allowing line and neutral to be reversed. The socket also accepts Europlugs and CEE 7/17 plugs. It is rated at 16 A. The current German standards are DIN 49441:1972-06 "Two-pole plugs with earthing-contact 10 A 250 V≅ and 10 A 250 V–, 16 A 250 V~" (which also includes CEE 7/7 plug) and DIN 49440-1:2006-01 "Two-pole socket-outlets with earthing contact, 16 A 250 V a.c."

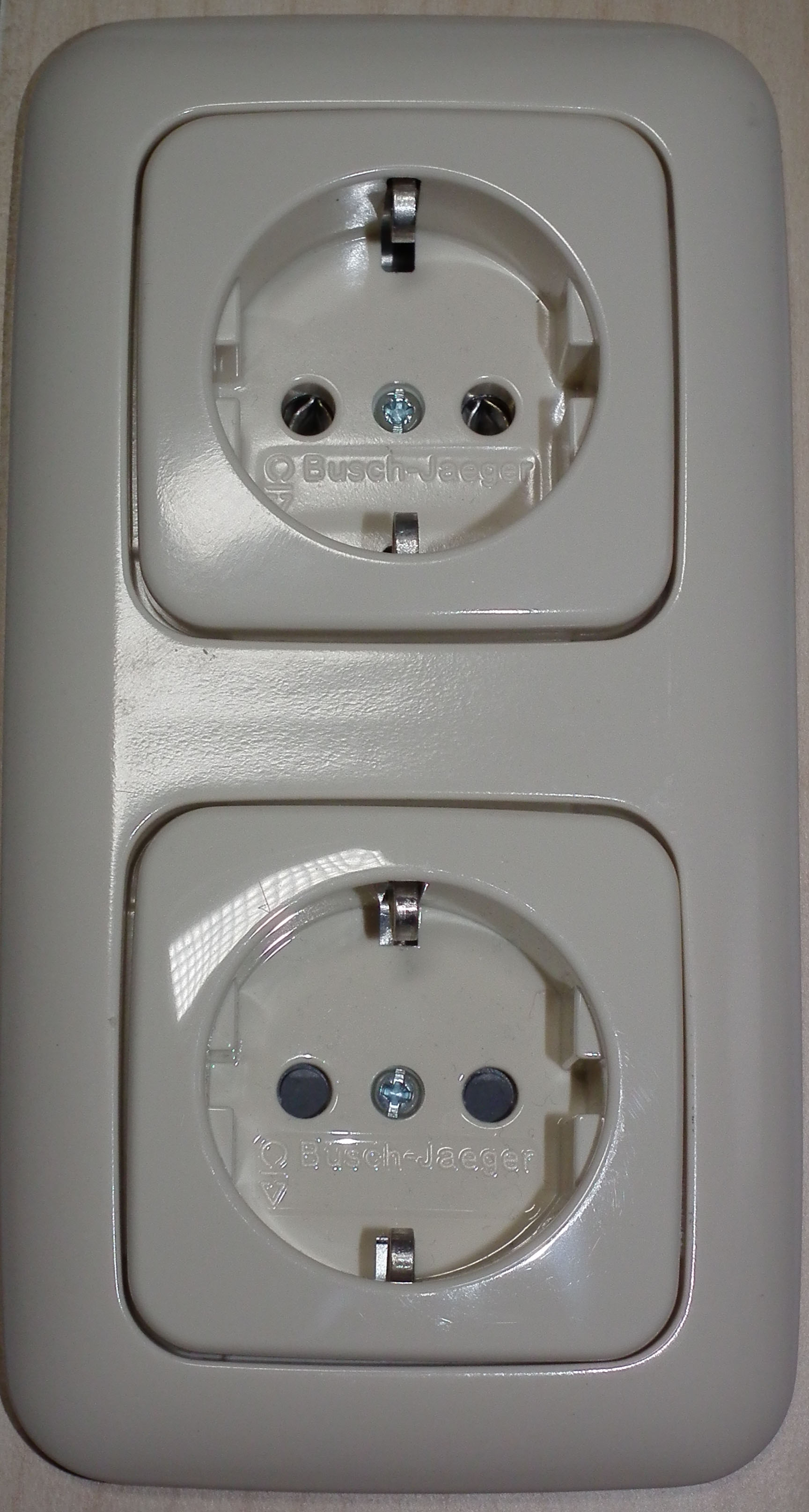
Two Schuko (CEE 7/3) socket-outlets manufactured by Busch-Jaeger Elektro GmbH, the lower has (black) protective shutters, the upper does not, revealing internal metal contacts.

In addition to Germany, it is used in Albania, Austria, Belarus, Bosnia and Herzegovina, Bulgaria, Chile, Croatia, Denmark, Estonia, Finland, Georgia, Greece, Hungary, Iceland, Indonesia, Iran, Italy (standard CEI 23-50), Kazakhstan, Latvia, Lithuania, Luxembourg, North Macedonia, Moldova, the Netherlands, Norway, Pakistan, Peru, Portugal, Romania, Russia, Serbia, Slovenia, South Korea, Spain, Sweden, Turkey, Ukraine, and Uruguay.

It was widely used in Ireland until 1964, a legacy of Ireland's early electricity grid which was largely built based on design work on the Shannon hydroelectric scheme by Siemens-Schuckert. The British BS 1363 (localized as Irish Standard I.S.401) was adopted as the new standard plug to ease import of electrical appliances from the UK. CEE 7/1 and CEE 7/4 are still occasionally found in less used areas of some older homes, particularly in outbuildings or hot presses.

Schuko is an abbreviation for the German word Schutzkontakt, which means "Protective contact" - in this case "protective" refers to the earth.

Some countries, including South Korea, Portugal, Finland, Denmark, Norway, and Sweden, require child-proof socket shutters. The old German DIN 49440-1:2006-01 standard did not have this requirement, but the current German DIN VDE 0620:2021-02 describes outlets with this requirement.

== CEE 7/5 socket and CEE 7/6 plug (Belgian or French; Type E) ==
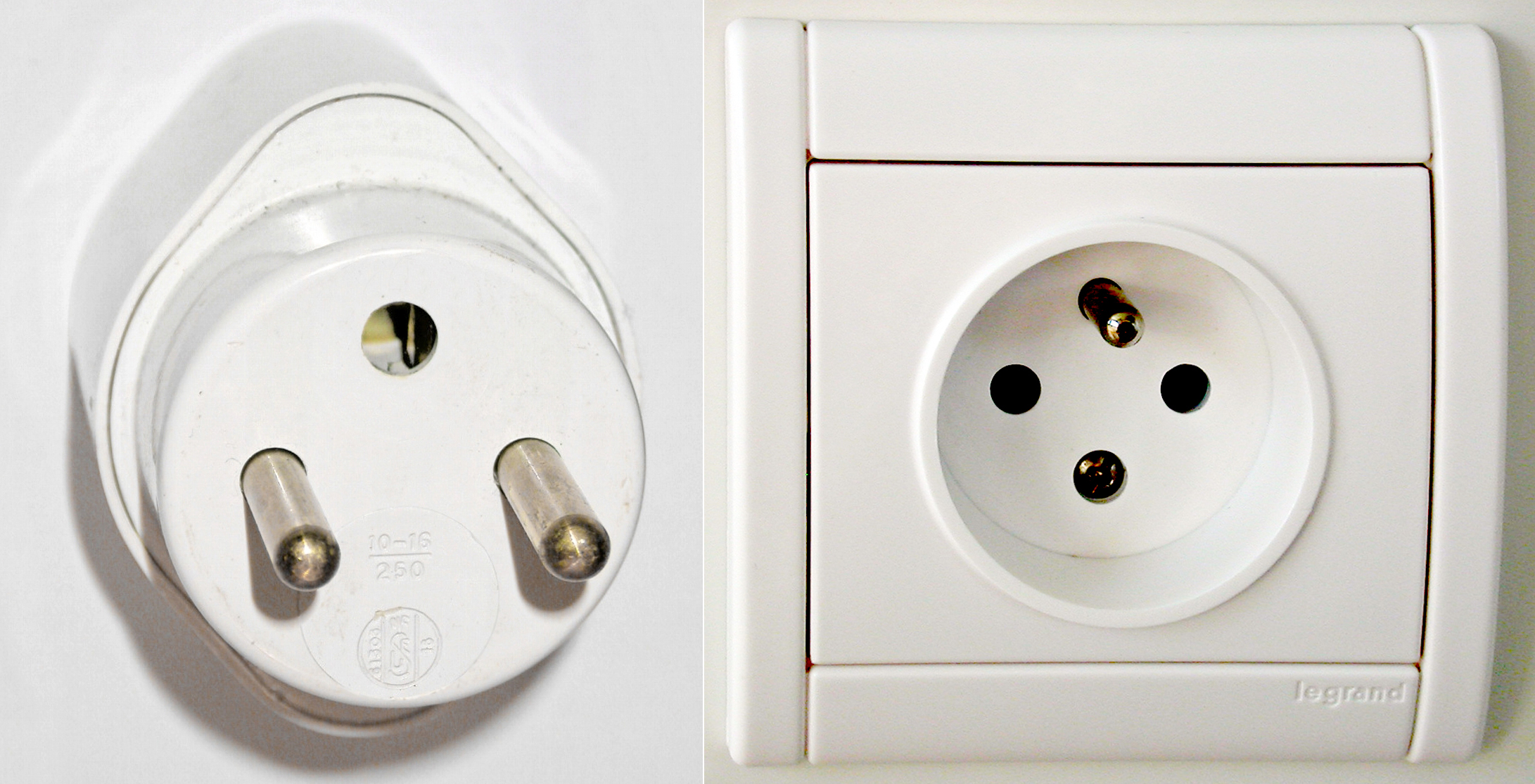
CEE 7/5 ("Type E") plug and socket

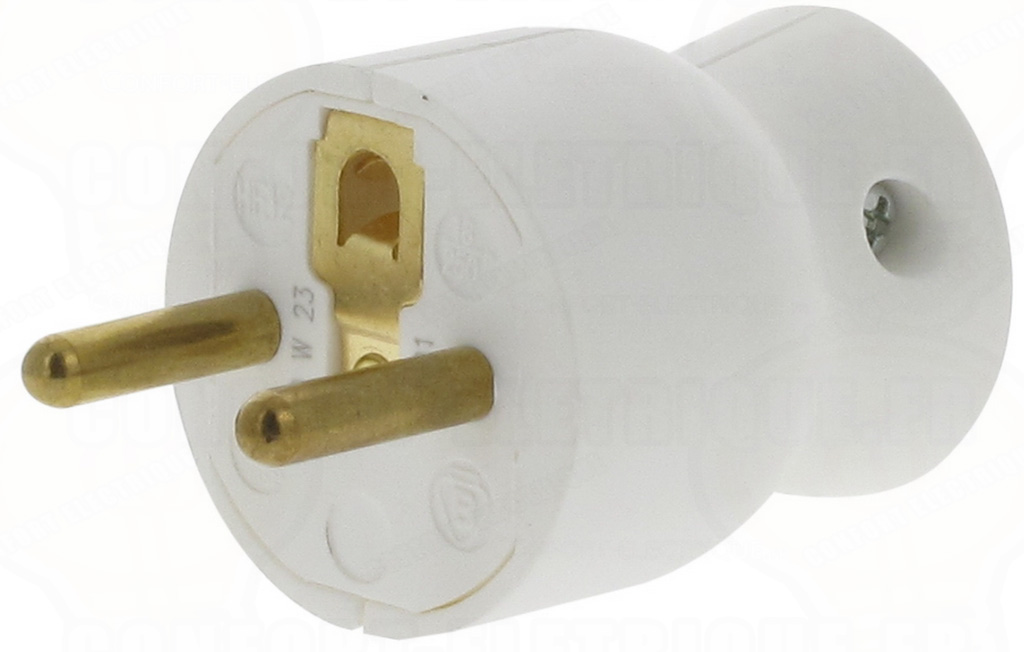
Rewireable CEE 7/6 plug

This electrical connector most likely originated in Belgium, where it was introduced in the 1930s by Vynckier Frères as well as Niko. France may have adopted it only in the 1950s, replacing German-type Schuko plugs and sockets which had been used since the 1930s.

The CEE 7/5 socket and CEE 7/6 plug are defined in several national standards, among them the Belgian NBN C 61‑112, the French NF C 61-314, and the Czech ČSN 35 4516. The socket has a circular recess which is 15 mm (0.591 in) deep with two symmetrical round apertures and a round 4.8 mm (0.189 in) earth pin projecting from the socket such that the tip is 23 mm (0.906 in) beyond the live contacts, to ensure that the earth is always engaged before live pin contact is made. The earth pin is centred between the apertures, offset by 10 mm (0.394 in). The plug (which is often, in error, also referred to as CEE 7/5) has two round pins measuring 4.8 by 19 mm (0.189 by 0.748 in), spaced 19 mm (0.748 in) apart and with an aperture for the socket's projecting earth pin.

The CEE 7/5 socket is in Europe the primary standard of Belgium, Czechia, France, Poland, and Slovakia. In Denmark including the Faroe Islands and Greenland, both CEE 7/3 and CEE 7/5 are nowadays explicitly allowed alongside Type K. Further countries outside of Europe are listed at Mains electricity by country.

Although the classic CEE 7/6 plug could be polarised, CEE 7 does not define the placement of the line and neutral and there is no universally observed standard. Moreover, this plug has been largely phased out in favour of the CEE 7/7 plug, which does not support any particular polarisation when used in Schuko sockets.

CEE 7/2 and 7/4 plugs are not compatible with the CEE 7/5 socket because of the round earthing pin permanently mounted in the socket.

== CEE 7/7 plug (compatible with E and F) ==
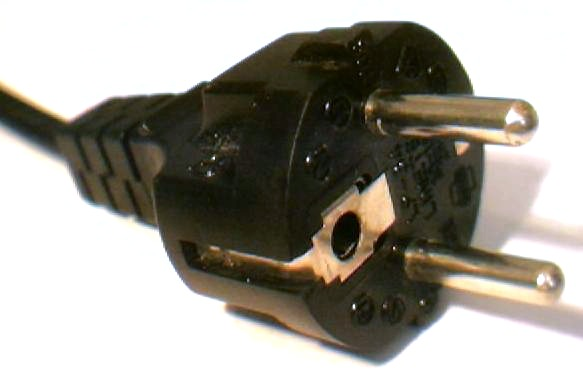
CEE 7/7 plug

To bridge the differences between German and French standards, the CEE 7/7 plug was developed. The plug is rated at 16 A.

It has earthing clips on both sides to connect with the CEE 7/3 socket and a female contact to accept the earthing pin of the CEE 7/5 socket. Currently, appliances in many countries are sold with non-rewireable CEE 7/7 plugs attached, enabling use in all countries whose socket standards are based on either CEE 7/3 or CEE 7/5.

This plug can be inserted into a Danish Type K socket, but earthing is not enabled.

== CEE 7/16 plugs ==
The CEE 7/16 standard sheet appears in Supplement 2 (June 1962) to the 1951 edition of CEE 7. The CEE 7/16 unearthed plug is used for low power Class II applications, it has two round 4 by 19 mm (0.157 by 0.748 in) pins, rated at 2.5 A. There are two variants.

=== CEE 7/16 Alternative I ===
Alternative I is a round plug with cutouts to make it compatible with CEE 7/3 and CEE 7/5 sockets. (The similar-appearing CEE 7/17 has larger pins and a higher current rating.) This alternative is seldom used.

=== CEE 7/16 Alternative II "Europlug" (Type C) ===
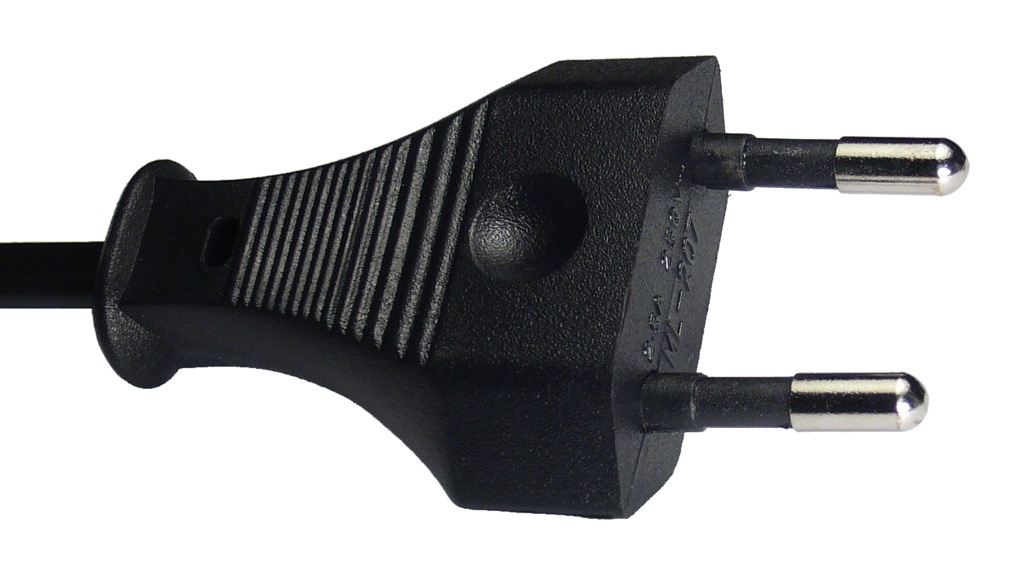
Example of a Europlug

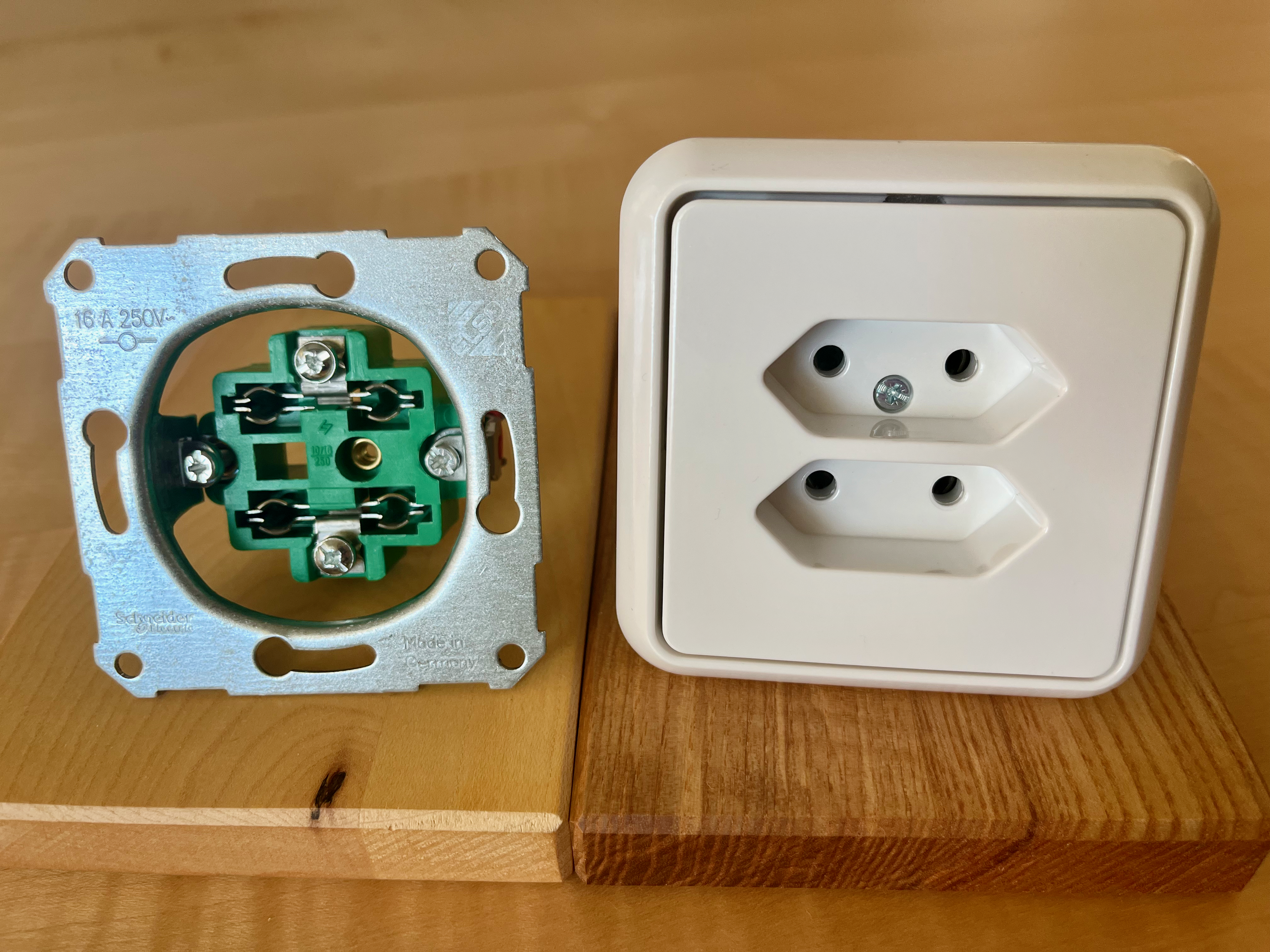
An unofficial double "Eurosocket". Although these are not defined by any standard, they are nevertheless manufactured and sold by some companies. Since they also accept Swiss Type 11 and Italian CEI 23-50 S10 plugs due to the nearly identical form factor, they should be rated for at least 10 A to allow safe usage (this one is rated for 16 A).

Alternative II, popularly known as the Europlug, is a flat plug defined by Cenelec standard EN 50075 and national equivalents. The Europlug is not rewirable and must be supplied with a flexible cord. It is rated for voltages up to 250 V and currents up to 2.5 A. It can be inserted in either direction, so line and neutral are connected arbitrarily.

There is no socket defined by EN 50075; nor a socket specified in CEE 7 to accept only the Europlug. Instead, the Europlug was designed to be compatible with a range of sockets in common use in Europe. These sockets, including the CEE 7/1, CEE 7/3 (German/"Schuko"), CEE 7/5 (Belgian/French), and most Israeli, Swiss, Danish and Italian sockets, were designed to accept pins of various diameters, mainly 4.8 mm but also 4.0 mm and 4.5 mm, and are usually fed by final circuits with either 10 A or 16 A overcurrent protection devices. To improve contact with socket parts the Europlug has slightly flexible pins which converge toward their free ends.

British shaver sockets designed to accept BS 4573 shaver plugs also accept Europlugs for applications requiring less than 200 mA. Other than such personal hygiene applications, British consumer protection legislation does not permit Europlugs.

== CEE 7/17 unearthed plug ("contour") ==
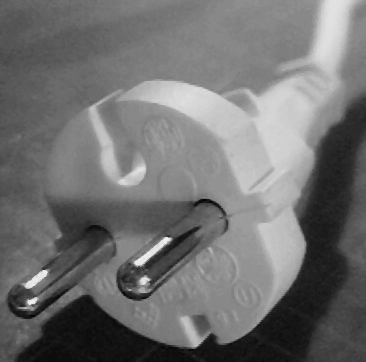
CEE 7/17 plug

This is a round plug which conforms to a shape compatible with CEE 7/1, CEE 7/3, and CEE 7/5 sockets. It has two round pins measuring 4.8 by 19 mm (0.189 by 0.748 in). It may be rated at either 10 A or 16 A, and may be used for unearthed Class II appliances (and in South Korea for all domestic non-earthed appliances). It is also defined as the Class II plug in Italian standard CEI 23-50. It can be inserted into Israeli SI 32 with some difficulty. The Soviet GOST 7396 standard includes both the CEE 7/17 and the CEE 7/16 variant II plug.

== See also ==
- Mains electricity by country
- BS 1363, British standard system of connectors, incompatible with CEE 7
- CEI 23-50, Italian standard system of connectors, partly compatible with CEE 7
- DS 107-2-D1, Danish standard system of connectors, partly compatible with CEE 7
- IEC 60320, international standard for appliance couplers
- IEC 60906-1, IEC standard connector used in Brazil and South Africa, fully compatible with CEE 7/16 (Europlug)
- NEMA connector, North American and Japanese standard system of connectors, incompatible with CEE 7
- SN 441011, Swiss standard system of connectors, fully compatible with CEE 7/16 (Europlug)
