= GOST 7396 =

Standards for power plugs and sockets

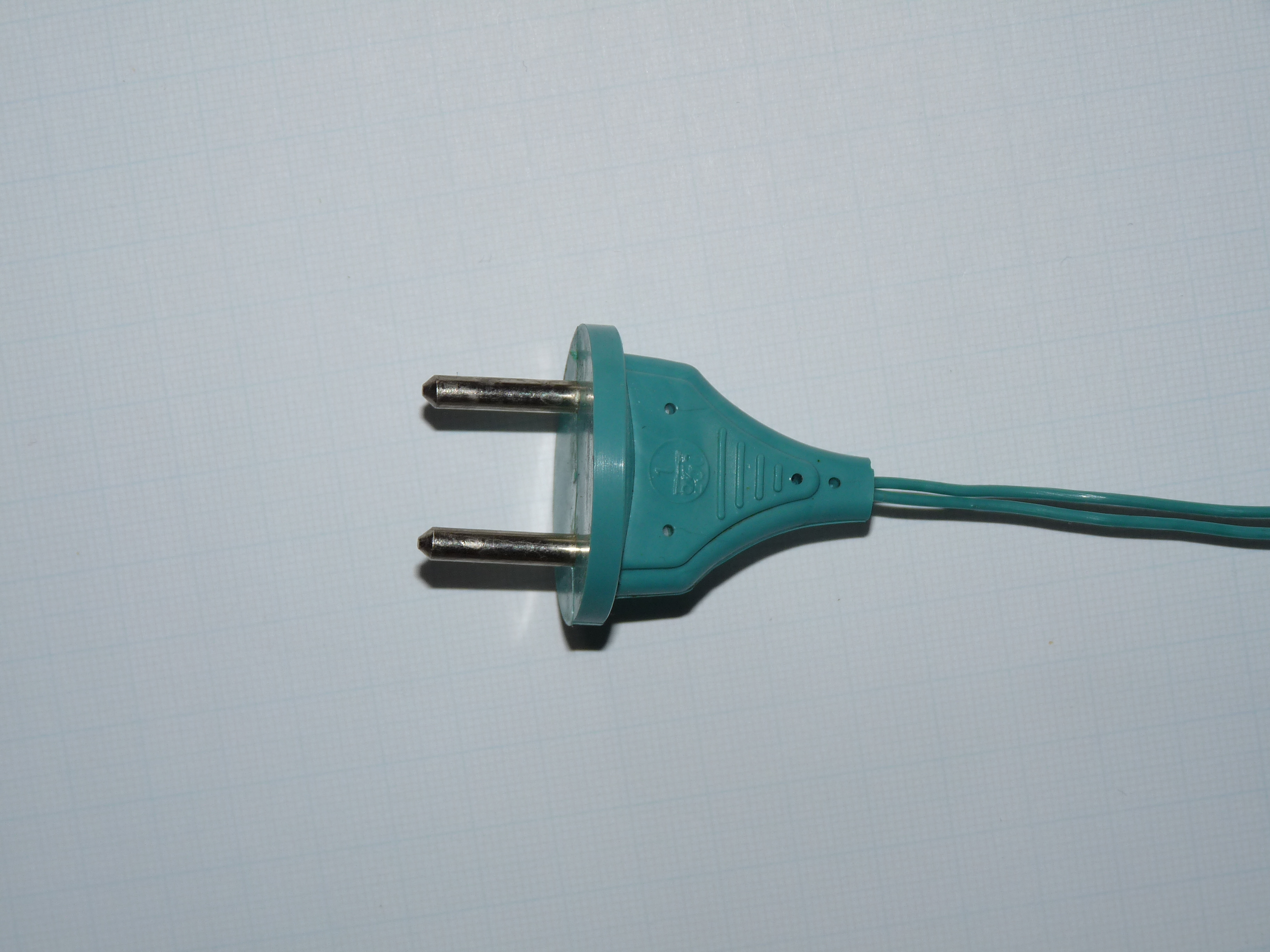

GOST 7396 (ГОСТ 7396 in Cyrillic) is a series of Soviet and later Russian standards that adopt International Electrotechnical Commission (IEC) standards IEC 60083:1975 and IEC 60884-2-1:1987 and specify basic dimensions and safety requirements for power plugs and sockets used in Russia and other former Soviet Republics, as well as for export to markets that use American or British plugs.

Many official standards in Eastern Europe are virtually identical to the Schuko standard. One of the protocols governing the German reunification process required that the DIN and VDE e.V. standards would prevail without exception, so the former East Germany had to conform to the Schuko standard. Most other Eastern European countries use the Schuko standard internally. However, before its collapse, they exported large volumes of appliances to the Soviet Union with the Soviet standard plug installed. Because of that, many of the Russian plugs found their way into different Eastern European countries. One peculiarity of the Soviet standard is the use of an ungrounded plug with 4.0 mm diameter pins for 6 A and a corresponding socket that would not accept the 4.8 mm diameter pins of devices that could draw as much as 16 A. These sockets were sometimes modified by enlarging the holes of the plastic (Bakelite) covering with a 5.0 mm drill bit to accept newer plugs. Also, sockets that in other places would be supplied with 16 A may have been wired for only 10 A during the Soviet era.

The series includes the following standards:

- GOST 7396.1-89 Plugs and Socket-Outlets for Household and Similar Purposes - Basic Dimensions. Fully compliant with IEC 83-75 (IEC 60083:1975)
- GOST 7396.2-91 Plugs and Socket-Outlets for Household and Similar Purposes - Particular Requirements for Fused Plugs - General Technical Specifications. Direct application of IEC 884-2-1-87 (IEC 60884-2-1:1987) with national adaptations

== Group A ==
Group A connectors consist of the non-locking NEMA connectors (Types A and B), which are defined for the assistance of exporters. Thus for example, an A 5-15 plug is the standard NEMA 5-15 household grounded plug used in North America.

== Group B ==
Group B connectors are also defined for the assistance of exporters to countries that use connectors based on British standards. The B 1 series defines the BS 546 3 pin unfused plugs of 2 A, 5 A (Type D), and 15 A (Type M), while the B 2 plug is the same as the BS 1363 (Type G) fused plug.

== Group C ==
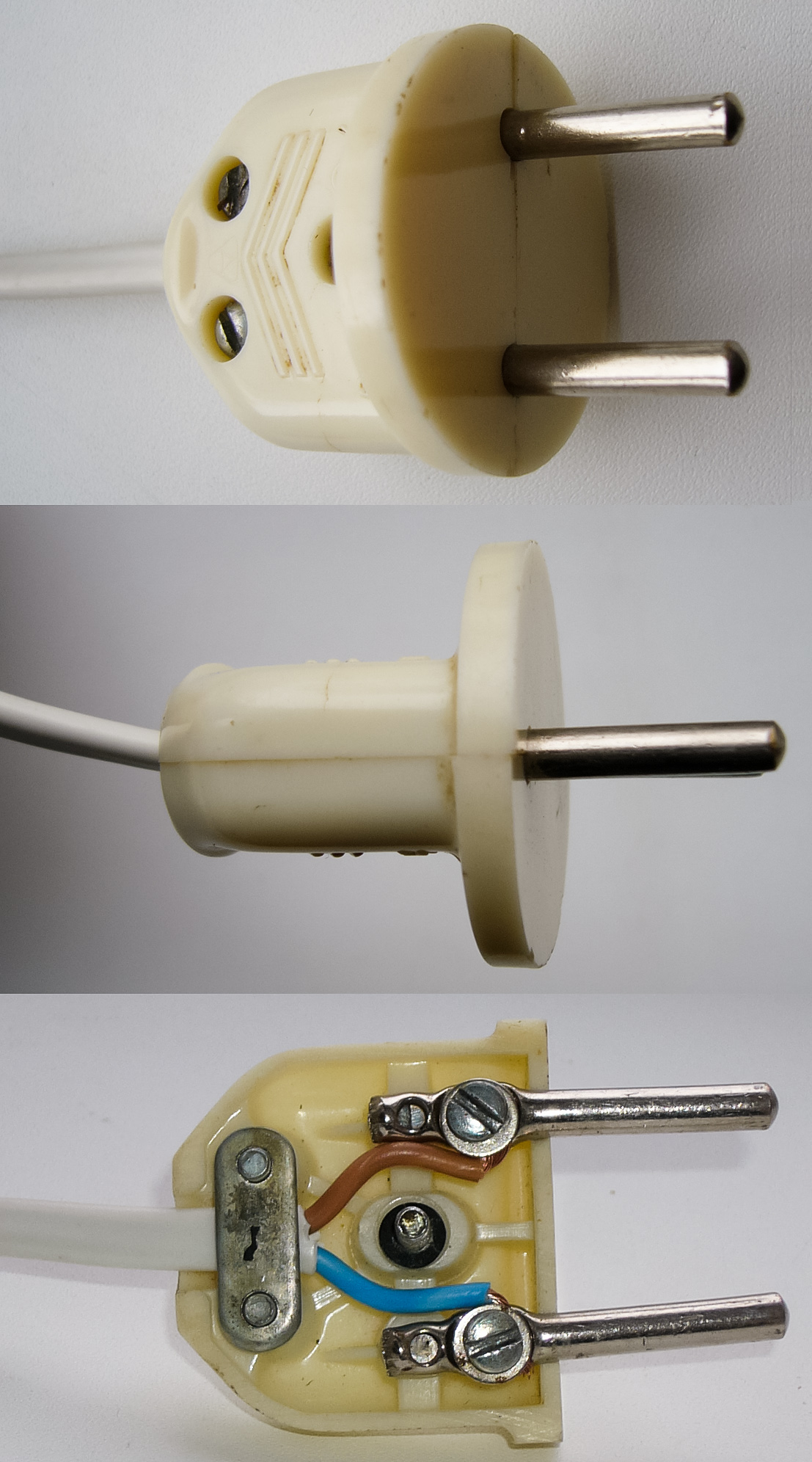
6 A variety of the C 1 plug

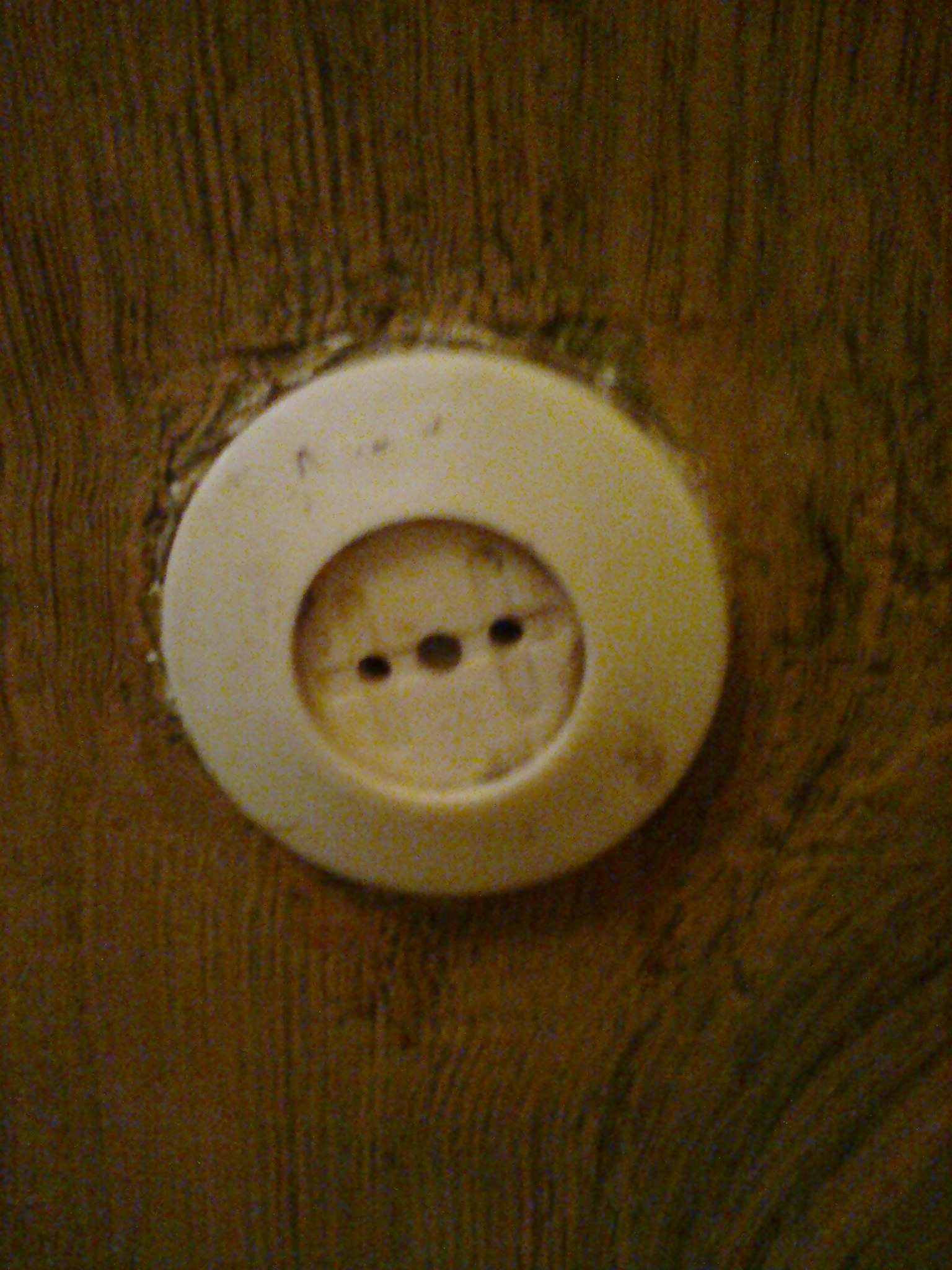
Soviet electric socket

Group C connectors are various CEE 7 plugs used in continental Europe, with allowances made for various Soviet era plugs that are compatible with them. Note that in Soviet-era construction the 16 A versions may be supplied with only a 10 A service.

C 1: 2-pin ungrounded 6 A and 16 A
Both varieties of this connector use two pins with centers spaced 19.0 mm apart. The 6 A variety has pins on the plug with a 4.0 mm diameter with the corresponding socket holes having a diameter of 4.5 mm. The corresponding dimensions on the 16 A are 4.8 mm and 5.5 mm respectively. Thus a 6 A plug fits into both varieties of this socket, but the 16 A plug does not fit into the 6 A socket. The 16 A socket will accept all group C plugs, but does not provide grounding.
C 2: CEE 7/4 Schuko 16 A (Type F)
This is the standard Schuko connector used in much of continental Europe. The Schuko plug will fit into the 16 A variety of the C 1 socket, but will not be grounded.
C 3: CEE 7/6 French 16 A (Type E)
This is the standard connector found in France, Belgium, Poland, Czech Republic, and Slovakia. The plug will fit into the 16 A variety of the C 1 socket, but will not be grounded.
C 4: CEE 7/7 16 A
This is the compromise plug designed to be accepted and to be grounded in both the Schuko and French sockets. The plug will fit into the 16 A variety of the C 1 socket, but will not be grounded.
C 5: CEE 7/16 Europlug 2.5 A (Type C)
The standard Europlug is defined here, as is a version of the C 6 (CEE 7/17) plug, but with 4.0 mm diameter pins. The standard allows for the use of devices that draw as much as 6 A with these round variants.
C 6: CEE 7/17 16 A
The standard CEE 7/17 ungrounded plug with 4.8 mm diameter pins is defined here. Note that the GOST standard defines a variant with 4.0 mm diameter pins for use with devices of 6 A or less, which it classifies as a variant shape of the C 5 plug.

Compatibility Table
		Plugs
		C 1		C 2	C 3	C 4	C 5	C 6
		6 A	16 A	C 2	C 3	C 4	C 5	C 6
Sockets	C 1 6 A	Y	N	N	N	N	Y	N
Sockets	C 1 16 A	Y	Y	Y	Y	Y	Y	Y
Sockets	C 2	N	N	Y	N	Y	Y	Y
Sockets	C 3	N	N	N	Y	Y	Y	Y

== See also ==
- GOST standards
- Domestic AC power plugs and sockets
- Schuko
- Europlug
