= CEI 23-50 =

Italian mains plug and socket standard

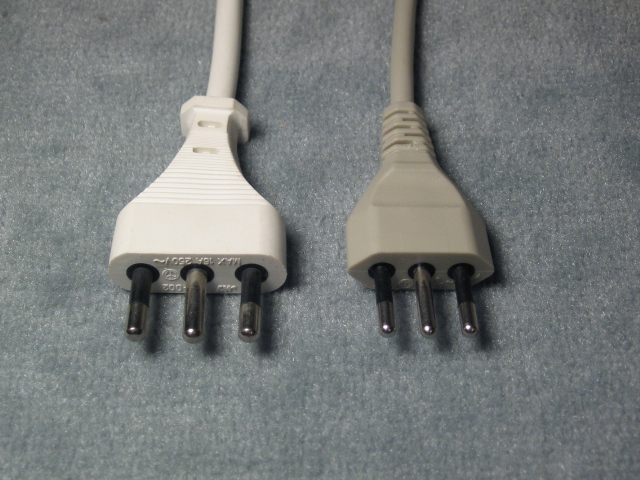
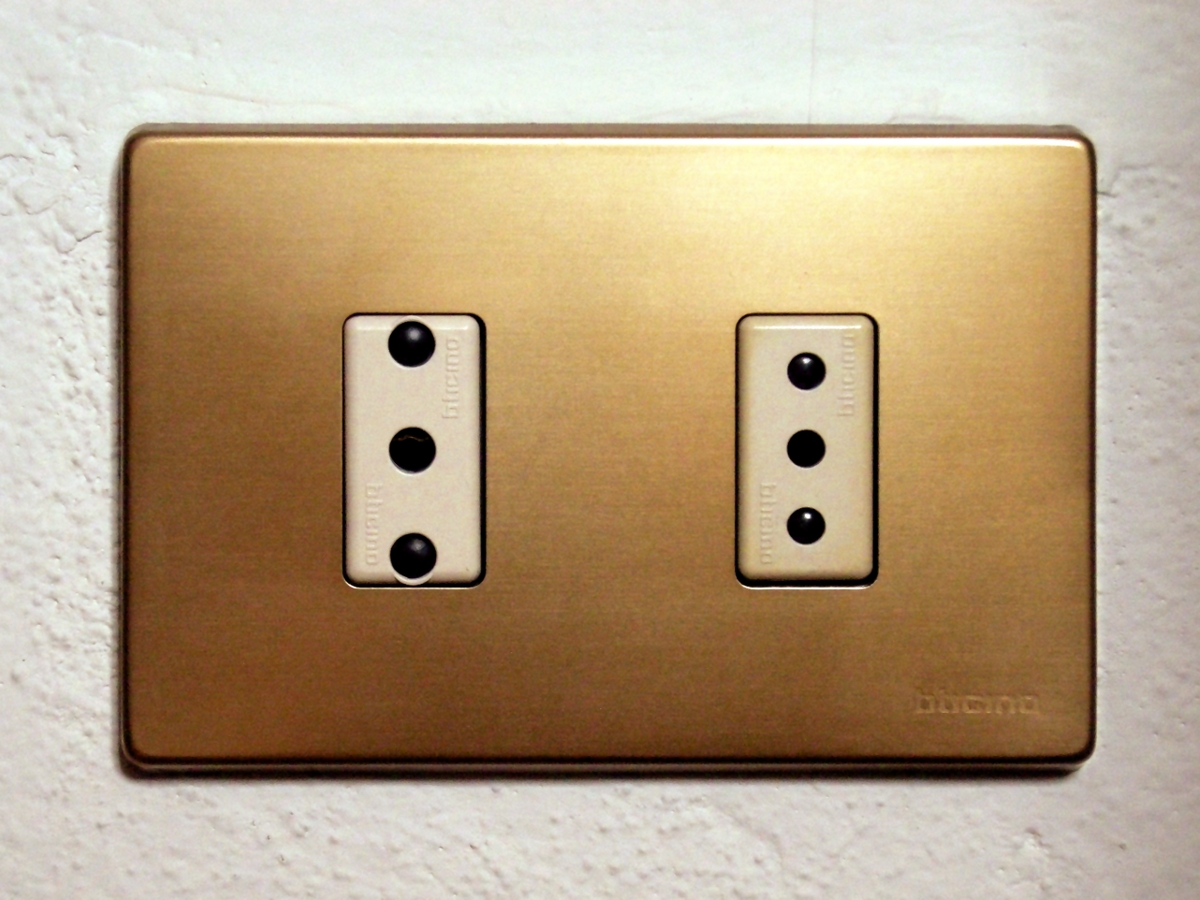
Side by side comparison of Italian CEI 23-50 S 17 and S 11 plugs and sockets rated 16 A (left) and 10 A (right)

CEI 23-50 (Note: Comitato Elettrotecnico Italiano 23-50) is the Italian national standard for AC power plugs and sockets for households and similar purposes. The system is typically used with 220 to 230 V, 50 Hz. The corresponding sockets are internationally designated by the IEC as the "Type L" plugs, even though there are two incompatible variations of it.

The standard is used in Italy, San Marino and Vatican City, and are also commonly used in Chile and Uruguay. Some, but not all, European plugs (CEE 7) are compatible with Italian sockets, although there also exist multi-sockets that can accept both CEI 23-50 plugs and most CEE 7 ones.

== Structure and plugs ==
The Type L plug consists of three contact pins arranged in a line. However there are actually at least two different plug types with incompatible pin spacings. Both are symmetrical, allowing the live and neutral contacts to be inserted in either direction.

The current Italian standards provide for sockets to have child-resistant shutters ("Sicury" patent).

=== 10-amp plug ===
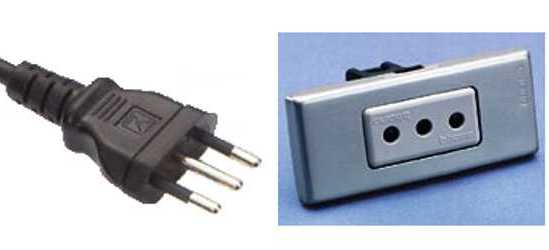
10-amp Italian plug and socket (CEI 23-50 S 11)

The first variant of the Italian plug has outer pins spaced 19 mm apart with each pin 4 mm in diameter. The maximum current is 10 A.

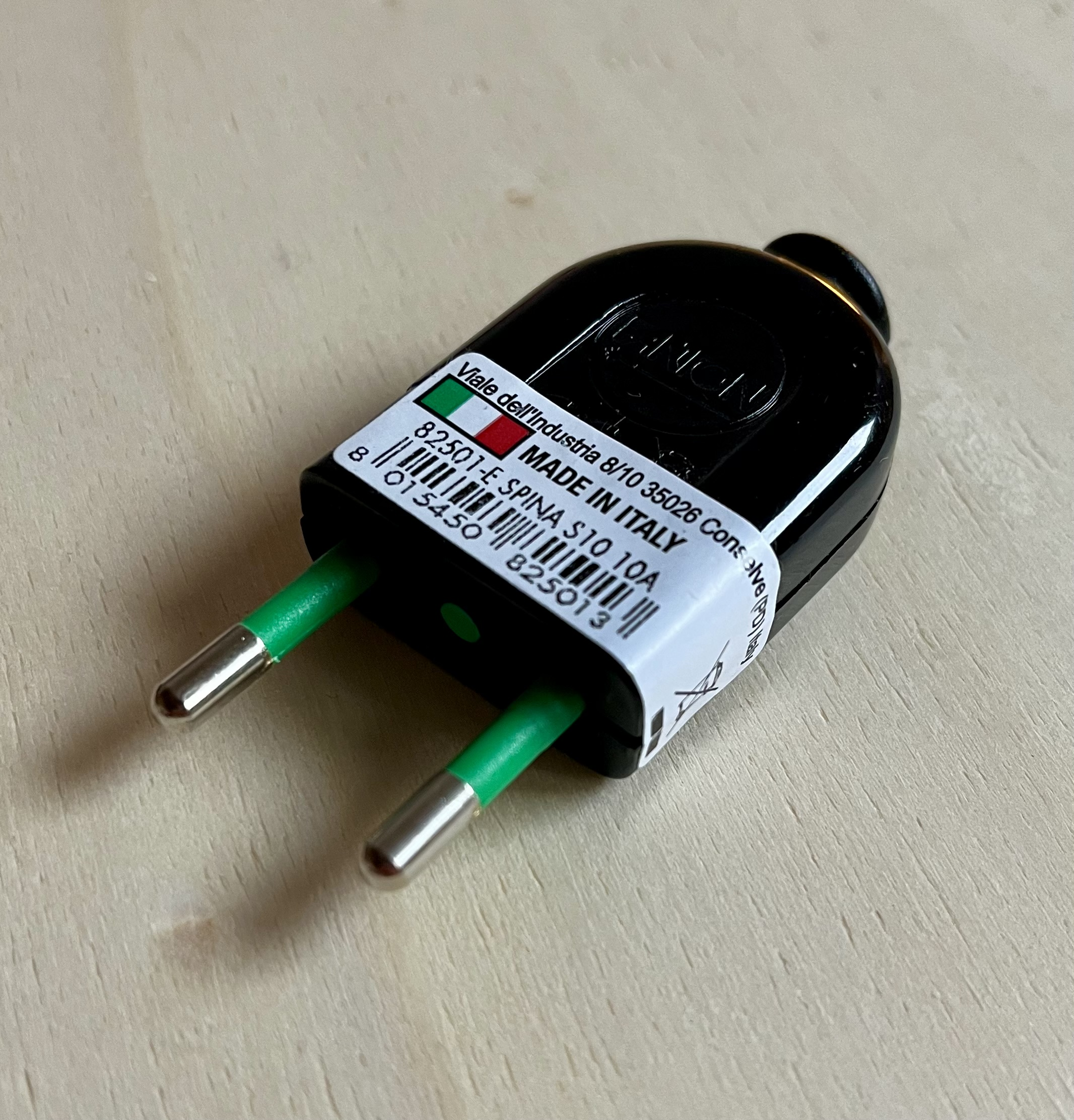
Two-pole unearthed 10-amp plug (CEI 23-50 S 10)

The 10-amp three-pin earthed rear entry plug is designated CEI 23-50 S 11 (there are also two side-entry versions, SPA 11 and SPB 11). The 10-amp two-pin unearthed plug is designated CEI 23-50 S 10. The 10-amp three-pin earthed socket is designated CEI 23-50 P 11, and the 10-amp two-pin unearthed socket is designated CEI 23-50 P 10. Both 10-amp sockets also accept CEE 7/16 (Europlugs).

=== 16-amp plug ===
The second variant is designed for increased currents up to 16 A, and features larger pins which are 5 mm in diameter. However the distance between the outer pins is 26 mm. This means that the two variants are physically incompatible. The grounding pin is again located between the live pins.

The 16-amp socket used to be referred to as per la forza motrice (for electromotive force) or sometimes (inappropriately) industriale (industrial) or even calore (heat).

The 16-amp three-pin earthed rear entry plug is designated CEI 23-50 S 17 (there are also two side-entry versions, SPA 17 and SPB 17). The 16-amp two-pin unearthed plug is designated CEI 23-50 S 16. The 16-amp three-pin earthed socket is designated CEI 23-50 P 17; there is currently no 16-amp two-pin unearthed socket.

== Historical background ==
The two standards were initially adopted because up to the second half of the 20th century in many regions of Italy electricity was supplied by means of two separate consumer connections – one for powering illumination and one for other purposes – and these generally operated at different voltages, typically 127 V (a single phase from 220 V three-phase) and 220 V (a single phase from three-phase 380 V or two-phase from 220 V three-phase). The electricity on the two supplies was separately metered, was sold at different tariffs, was taxed differently and was supplied through separate and different sockets.

Territories ceded to Yugoslavia in 1945 were connected to the Yugoslavian power grid and the voltage was increased to 220 V at 50 Hz (later to 230 V). In remaining Italian territory, even though the two electric lines (and respective tariffs) were gradually unified beginning in the 1960s (the official, but purely theoretical date was the summer of 1974) many houses had dual wiring and two electricity meters for years thereafter; in some zones of Lazio the 127-volt network was provided for lighting until 1999. The two gauges for plugs and sockets thus became a de facto standard which is now formalized under CEI 23-50. Some older installations have sockets that are limited to either 10- or 16-amp style plug, requiring the use of an adaptor if the other gauge needs to be connected. Numerous cross adaptors were used.

The CEI 23-16 standard (dated 1971) was succeeded by the current CEI 23-50 standard in 1995.

== Compatibility ==
Italian type L sockets rated for 10 A can accept Europlug and the two-pole Swiss plug for 10 A (SN 441011 type 11), but not contour plugs (CEE 7/17), Schuko/German plugs (type F) or French plugs (type E), as these have thicker (4.8 mm) pins than the Italian ones (4 mm). Italian 16 A sockets also cannot accept these three (although the pin thickness is correct, the spacing is too large) and cannot accept Europlugs either.

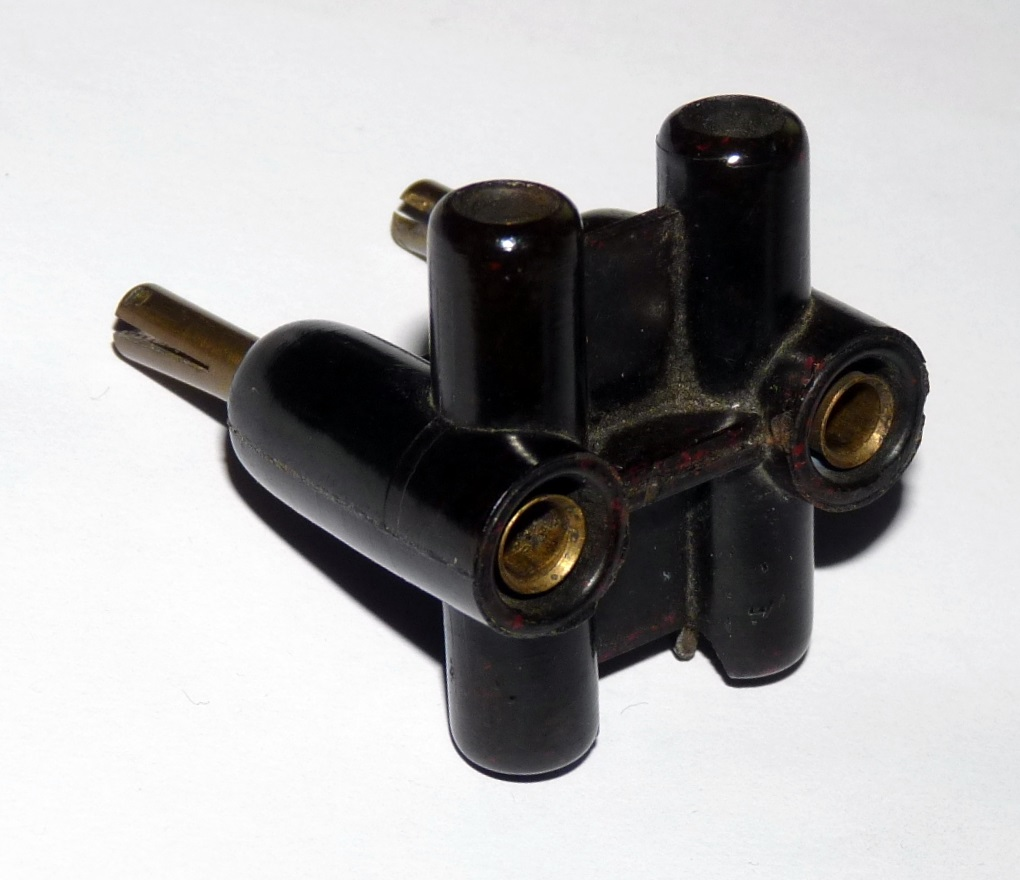
Old adaptor from forza to 2 × luce and 1 × forza

Adaptors are standardized in Italy under CEI 23-57 which can be used to connect CEE 7/7 (French+German) and CEE 7/17 (contour) and plugs to linear CEI 23-50 (Italian 16 A) sockets. Europlugs are also in common use in Italy; they are standardized under CEI 23-34 S 1 for use with the 10 A socket and can be found fitted to Class II appliances with low current requirement (less than 2.5 A).

=== Swiss standard SN 441011 ===
The Italian CEI 23-50 standard is very similar to the Swiss standard SN 441011, but with the key differences that the three-pole plugs according to the Italian standard are not reverse polarity protected due to the non-offset protective contact, and the Swiss standard now only permits sockets and couplings with protective collars.

== Italian multiple standard sockets ==
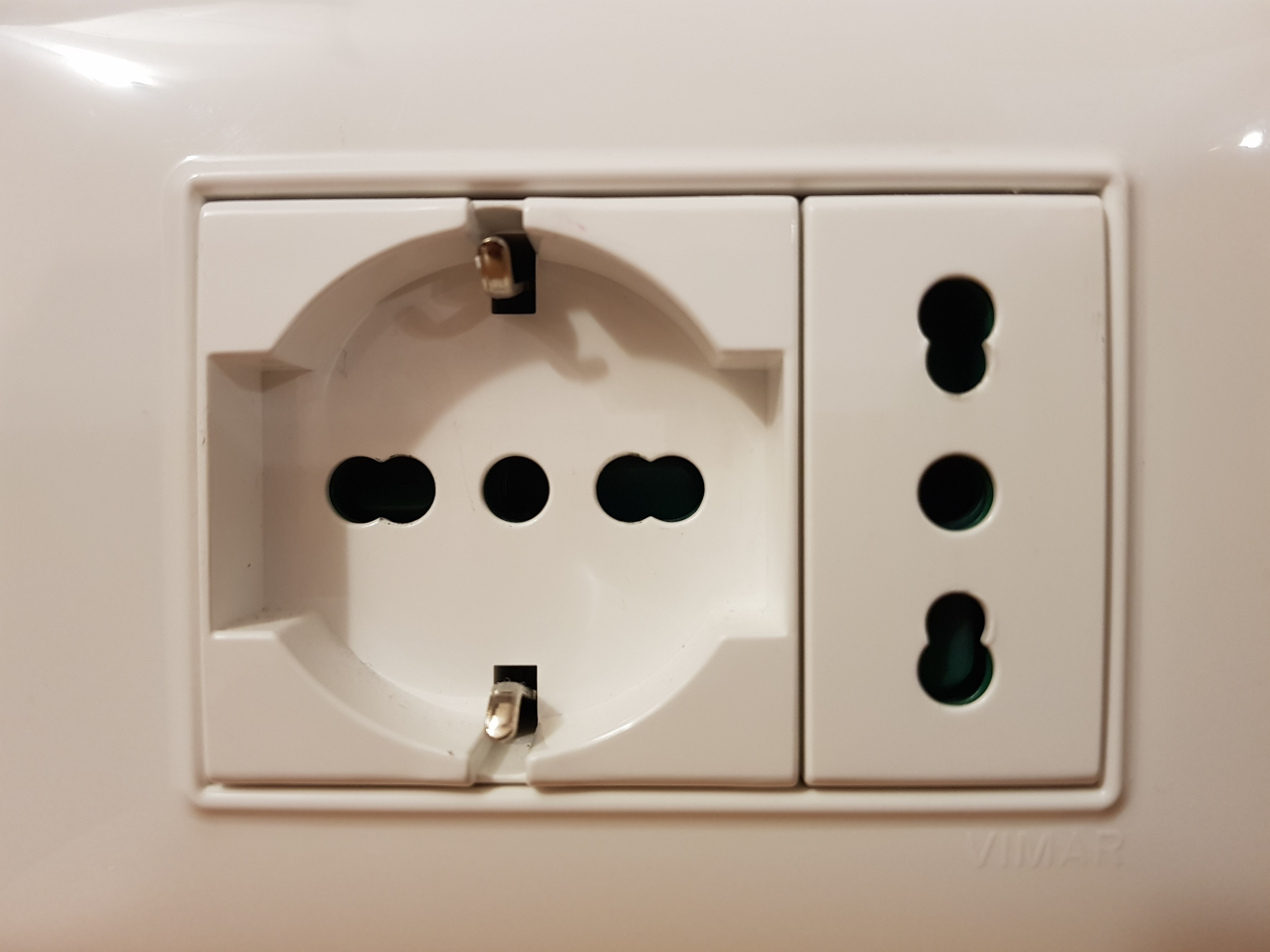
A CEI 23-50 P 40 socket (Italian adapted Schuko) next to a CEI 23-50 P 17/11 (bipasso) socket in a modern installation

In modern installations in Italy (and in other countries where Type L plugs are used) it is usual but not guaranteed to find sockets that can accept more than one standard.

=== Bipasso ===
The simplest type, designated CEI 23-50 P 17/11, has a central round hole flanked by two figure-8 shaped holes, allowing the insertion of CEI 23-50 S 10 (Italian 10-amp plug unearthed), CEI 23-50 S 11 (Italian 10-amp plug earthed), CEI 23-50 S 16 (Italian 16-amp plug unearthed), CEI 23-50 S 17 (Italian 16-amp plug earthed) and CEE 7/16 (Europlug).

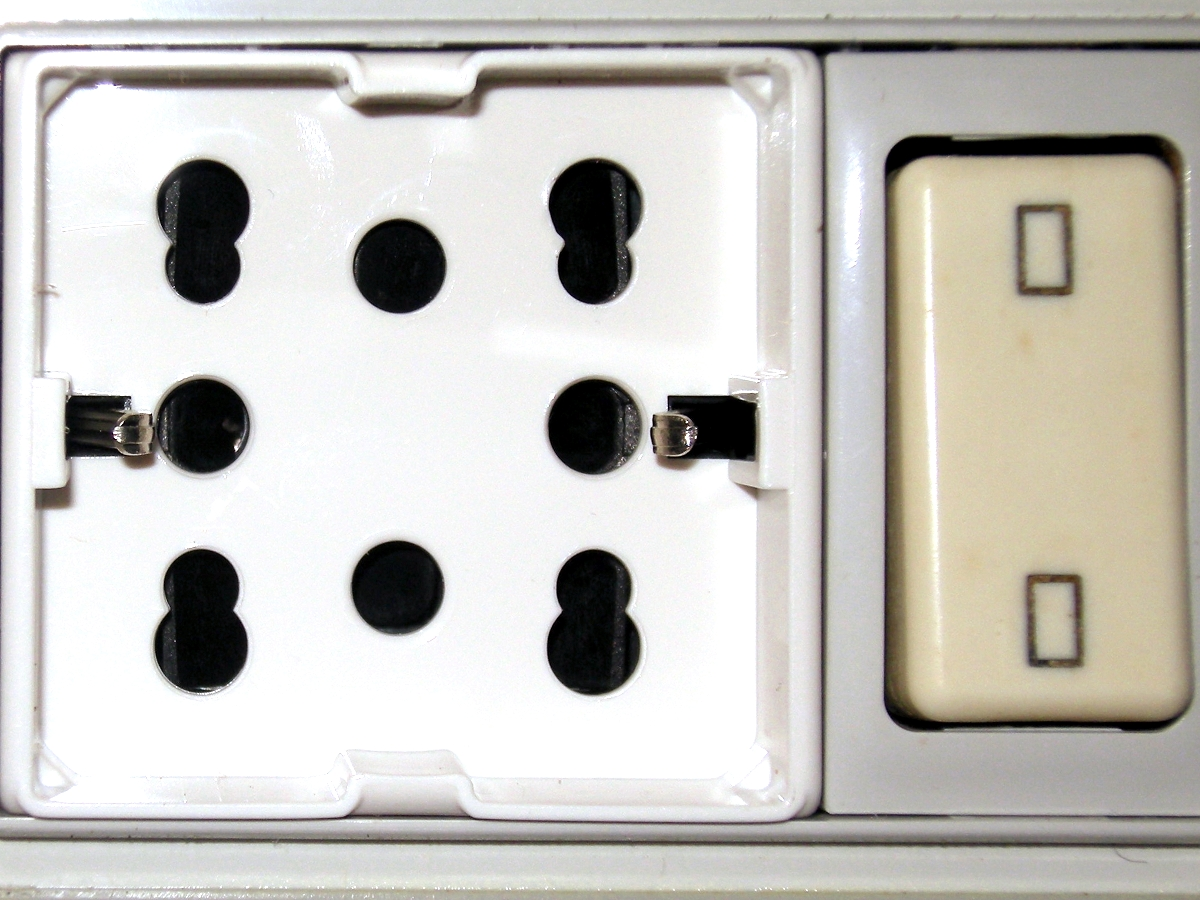
4box side socket combining a Schuko and two CEI 23-50 P 17/11 bipasso sockets

The advantage of this socket style is its small, compact face; its drawback is that it accepts neither CEE 7/7 (German/French) nor CEE 7/17 (countour), very commonly found in new appliances sold in Italy. Vimar brand claims to have patented this socket first in 1975 with their Bpresa model; however soon other brands started selling similar products, mostly naming them with the generic term presa bipasso (twin-gauge socket) that is now of common use.

=== P 30 ===
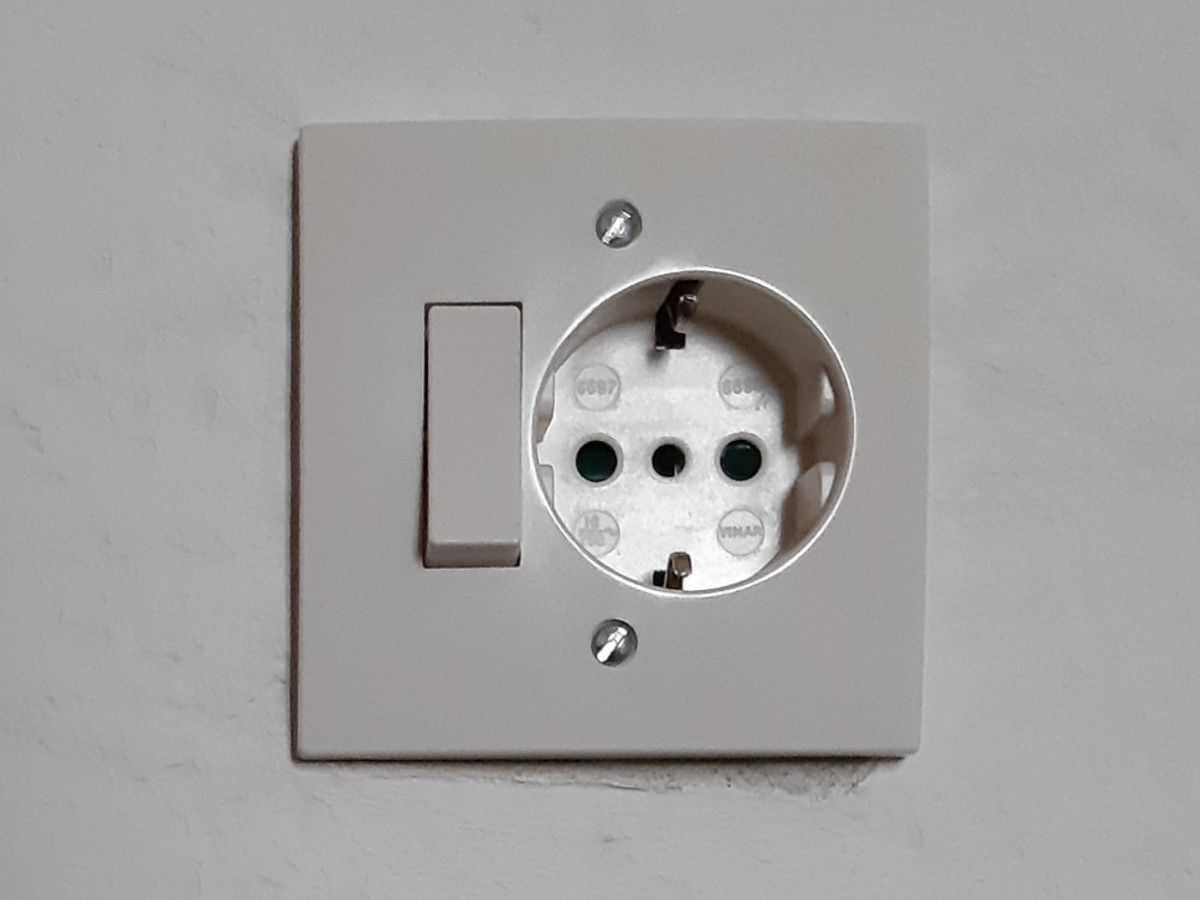
P 30 outlet, relatively uncommon in Italy today

A second type is called CEI 23-50 P 30 and looks like a Schuko socket, but adds a central earthing hole (optional according to CEI 23-50, but virtually always present). This design can accept CEE 7/4 (German), CEE 7/7 (German/French), CEE 7/16, CEE 7/17 (Konturenstecker, German/French unearthed), Italian CEI 23-50 S 10 and CEI 23-50 S 11 plugs. Its drawback is that, while it is twice as large as a normal Italian socket, it still does not accept Italian 16-amp plugs; therefore this socket is relatively rarely installed.

=== P 40 (Schuko duo) ===
A more flexible hybrid socket is called CEI 23-50 P 40. This socket, which is quickly becoming the standard in Italy along with CEI 23-50 P 17/11, accepts the same plugs as P 30 and additionally Italian S 16 and S 17 plugs. A small drawback is that it does not accept SPA 11, SPB 11, SPA 17 and SPB 17 side-entry plugs; however almost no appliance is sold with these types, which are mainly used to replace existing plugs.

== Bibliography ==
- De Cesco, Giancarlo (1975). Acqua, luce, gas. Manuali pratici del far da sé (in Italian). Vol. 1. Milan: Fabbri. ICCU SBL0584252.
