= Schuko =

Type of AC power plug and socket

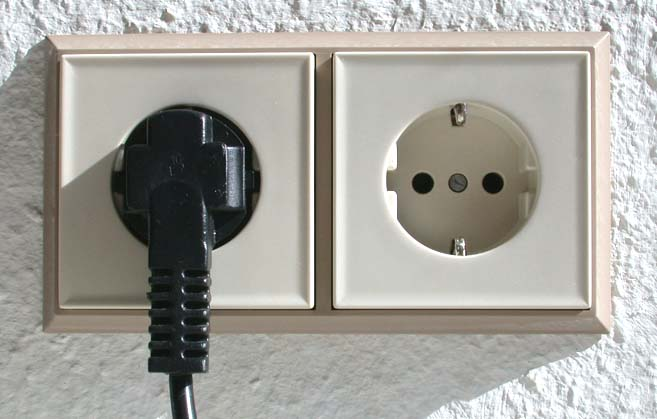
Double Schuko socket with one plug inserted. The dot in the middle of the socket is a screw head, not a third hole.

Illustration of the originally two Schuko plug and socket designs from the patent specification of patent DE567906 granted on 22 December 1932. The right-hand column shows the design that prevailed and is in use today.

Schuko (/ˈʃuːkoʊ/), also designated as plug Type F, is a connector (plug/socket) system used in much (but not all) of Europe. It is a registered trademark referring to a system of AC power plugs and sockets that is defined as "CEE 7/3" (sockets) and "CEE 7/4" (plugs) as part of the CEE 7 standards. As with most types of European sockets, Schuko sockets can accept "Type C" Europlugs.

Schuko is a syllabic abbreviation of the German term Schutzkontakt (literally: protective contact), which indicates that plug and socket are equipped with protective-earth contacts (in the form of clips rather than pins). Schuko connectors are normally used on circuits with 230 V, 50 Hz, for currents up to 16 A, although e.g. South Korea uses them at 60 Hz for historical reasons.

== Description ==
Interactive 3D model of a CEE 7/7 plug compatible with Type E and Type F sockets.

A Schuko plug features two round pins of 4.8 mm diameter (19 mm long, centres 19 mm apart) for the line and neutral contacts, plus two flat contact areas on the top and bottom side of the plug for protective earth (ground). The socket (which is often, in error, also referred to as CEE 7/4) has a predominantly circular recess which is 17.5 mm deep with two symmetrical round apertures and two earthing clips on the sides of the socket positioned to ensure that the earth is always engaged before live pin contact is made. Schuko plugs and sockets are symmetric AC connectors. They can be mated in two ways, therefore line can be connected to either pin of the appliance plug. Schuko plugs are considered a very safe design when used with Schuko sockets, but they can also mate with other sockets to give an unsafe result.

== History ==
The Schuko system originated in Germany. It is believed to date from 1925 and is attributed to Albert Büttner, a Bavarian manufacturer of electrical accessories. Büttner's company, Bayerische Elektrozubehör AG, was granted patent DE 489 003 in 1930 for a Stecker mit Erdungseinrichtung ('plug with earthing device'). Büttner's patent DE 370 538 is often quoted as referring to Schuko, but it actually refers to a method of holding together all of the parts of a plug or socket with a single screw which also provides clamping for the wires; there is no mention of an earth connection in DE 370538. At this time Germany used a 220 V centre tap giving 127 V from current pins to earth, which meant that fuse links were required in both sides of the appliance and double pole switches. Variations of the original Schuko plug are used today in more than 40 countries, including most of Continental Europe.

== Safety features ==
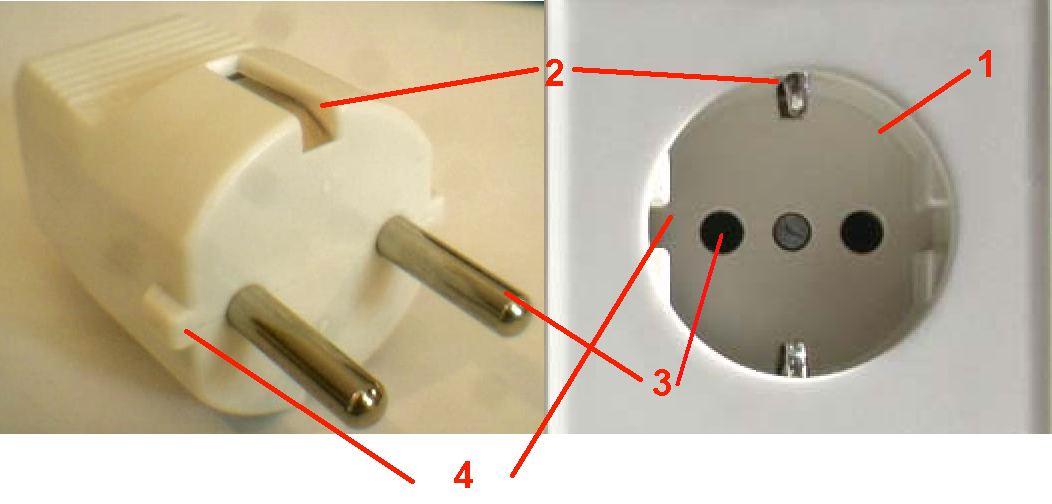
CEE 7/4 Schuko plug and CEE 7/3 Schuko socket

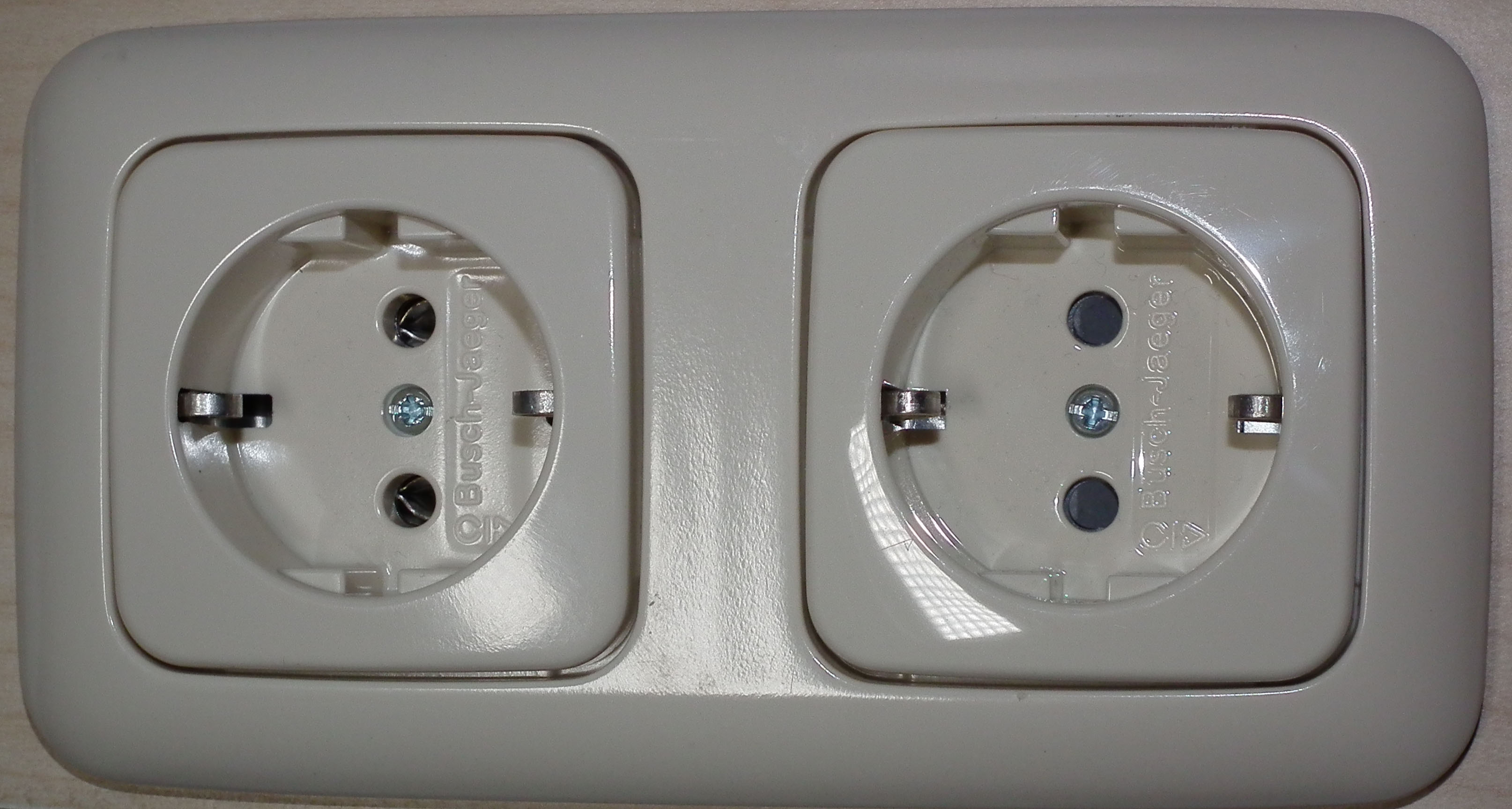
Schuko outlets manufactured by Busch-Jaeger Elektro. The right socket has protective shutters (gray in color) and the left does not.

When inserted into the socket, the Schuko plug covers the socket cavity (1), thereby preventing users from touching connected pins. It also establishes protective-earth connection through the earth clips (2) before the line and neutral pins (3) establish contact. A pair of non-conductive guiding notches (4) on the left and right side provides extra stability, enabling the safe use of large and heavy plugs (e.g. with built-in transformers or timers).

Some countries, including Portugal, Finland, Denmark, Norway, Sweden, and Italy require child-proof socket shutters; the German DIN 49440-1:2006-01 standard does not have this requirement.

== Compatibility with other plug/socket types ==
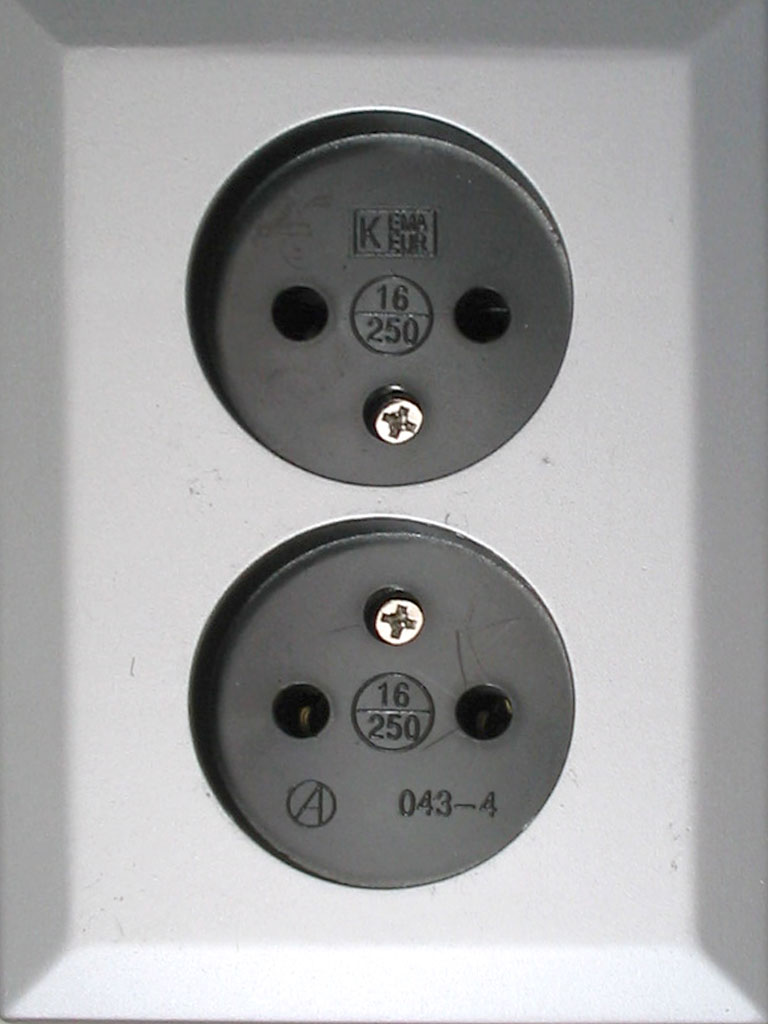
Non-earthed CEE 7/1 socket (bearing Dutch standard approval) that accepts Schuko plugs

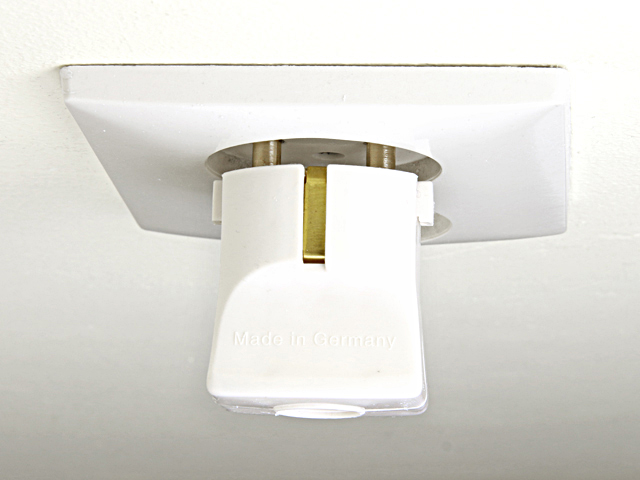
Schuko plug partially inserted in CEE 7/1 non-earthed socket, pins are in contact but exposed. There is no connection for the earthing contact.

Schuko sockets can accept two-pin unearthed Europlug (CEE 7/16) and CEE 7/17. Less safely, Schuko plugs can be inserted into many two-pin unearthed CEE 7/1 sockets and into some sockets with a different form of earth connection that will not mate with the earth contacts on the Schuko plug (e.g., some variants of the Danish socket). Many such sockets also lack the cavity required to prevent users from touching the pins whilst inserting the plug.

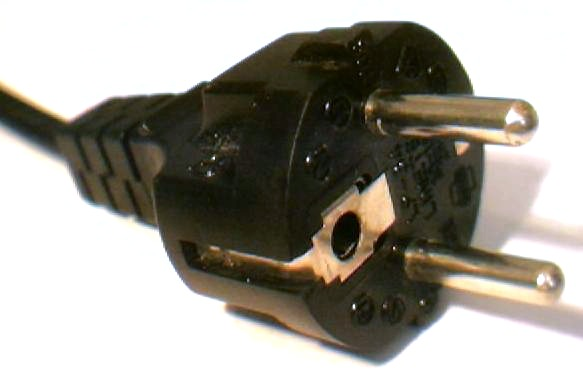
CEE 7/7 plug, compatible with both CEE 7/3 (Schuko) and CEE 7/5 sockets

The CEE 7/7 plug is a hybrid which includes both side earthing strips, as in CEE 7/4 Schuko, and an earthing aperture, as in the CEE 7/6 plug. It can therefore achieve an earth contact with both CEE 7/3 (Schuko) and CEE 7/5 sockets.

In Italy, Chile, Peru and Uruguay, hybrid versions of Schuko sockets (called P 30) are seen with an extra hole that will take the smaller variant of Italian CEI 23-50 plugs. There are also hybrid Schuko sockets (called P 40) with three extra holes and a wider cavity that will also accept the larger variant of Italian plugs.

Schuko sockets are unpolarised; there is no way of differentiating between the two live contacts (line which is approximately 230 V to earth and neutral which is approximately 0 V to earth) unless the voltage to earth is measured prior to use.

Although Schuko is incompatible and the pin spacing should not allow it, as the Schuko pins are slightly closer together, it is possible to dangerously force many Schuko round pin plugs (where the plastic is compliant enough) into many UK BS 1363 rectangular pin sockets, using a match or other probe to push into the earth shutter release. Due to the minimal contact area that must transmit high current, there is risk of overheating and thus fire. Where earthing is required, no earth contact will be made as Schuko plugs use side contacts for earthing rather than a third pin, and BS 1363 sockets have shutters that require the longer earth pin to be entered to open the line and neutral shutters, which prevent Europlugs and Schuko plugs from being inserted.

The IEC 60906-1 standard was intended to address some of the issues regarding polarisation and replace Schuko, but the only countries that have adopted it are South Africa and Brazil.

== Use within Europe ==
Currently used AC mains plugs in Europe: Schuko (Type F, CEE 7/4 plug, CEE 7/7 plug) French (Type E, CEE 7/6 plug, CEE 7/7 plug) British (Type G, BS 1363) Swiss (Type J, SN 441011) Danish 107-2-D1 (Type K) Italian CEI 23-50 (Type L)

France, Belgium, Czechia, Slovakia and Poland use the CEE 7/6 plug and CEE 7/5 socket (Type E) with the same size and spacing of the main pins but with a male protective-earth pin on the socket instead of the earth clips, and without the guiding notches at the sides. Most modern moulded Schuko plugs, and good-quality rewirable replacements, are a hybrid version ("CEE 7/7") with an aperture that accommodates the earth pin of CEE 7/5 sockets. CEE 7/6 plugs that need to be polarised are configured in such a way as to only be inserted correctly in earthed sockets, however the old CEE 7/1 2-pin unearthed socket is inherently dangerous with equipment that should be polarised, for example table lamps with an Edison screw lamp but only a single pole inline cord switch in lieu of a double pole switch. The safety of polarisation was not helped by several years of confusion when the correct connection of sockets was transposed.

Early in the 21st century, CEE 7/7 became the de facto plug standard in many European countries, and in some other countries that follow CENELEC standards. European countries that do not use CEE 7/7 are:

- Denmark (CEE 7/17 and Danish standard 107-2-D1 are widely used, they accept CEE 7/7 plugs but without compatibility for earth connections. CEE 7/5 and CEE 7/3 sockets with child-proof shutters have been allowed since 2008/2011, but are uncommon in buildings constructed before these dates).
- Ireland (BS 1363 – equivalent Irish Standard: IS 401) but see below,
- Italy (CEI 23-50 – includes Schuko),
- Malta (BS 1363),
- Cyprus (BS 1363),
- The United Kingdom, including Gibraltar (BS 1363)
- Switzerland (SN 441011)

In Italy, CEI 23-50 is the dominant standard and it also includes Schuko sockets (P 30 = CEE 7/3) and plugs (S 30 = CEE 7/4, S 31 = CEE 7/7, S 32 = CEE 7/17). Appliances are commonly sold with Schuko-type plugs (as well as Europlugs), while Italian-type plugs have become rare today and almost only power strips, cable reels and adaptors are sold with them. Some sockets (P 30 and P 40) accept both types, the remainder accepting one or the other. Schuko sockets are most commonly used for larger-rated appliances such as washing machines, and are particularly common in South Tyrol, with its cultural, economic and tourist connections with Austria.

Although Schuko has never been a standard (or the de facto norm) in Belgium or France, it is sometimes encountered in older installations in eastern regions of Belgium and Alsace.

In Ireland, Schuko was commonly installed until the 1960s. For safety reasons and to harmonize with the UK and thereby avoid having a different outlet type in Northern Ireland and the Republic of Ireland, the Republic standardized on BS 1363 (transposed into Irish Standards as IS 401 (Plug) and IS 411 (Socket outlet). Schuko has been phased out of use in Ireland and will be rarely encountered. Some hotels provide a Schuko outlet alongside BS 1363 outlets for the convenience of visitors from the Continent.

Russia, while maintaining its own mains connector standard, has it largely harmonised with the relevant European regulations since Soviet times. The original Soviet standard was mostly compatible with Europlug (the traditional Soviet plug used straight 4 mm pins with 19 mm spacing and thus Soviet sockets were able to easily accept europlugs), and has been modified to accept 4.8 mm pins, due to the large volume of imported appliances equipped with the Schuko plug. Nowadays most sold and installed sockets in Russia are Schuko ones, though they may lack a connection to earth, especially in older buildings, as this wasn't required by the Soviet wiring regulations.

Denmark gave full permission to install Schuko wall sockets in 2011, and such sockets can be found for sale at some Danish hardware stores, but the Danish Type K remains the most common earthed socket type in Denmark by far.

Greece used its own plugs and sockets (called tripoliki) until the government decided to switch over to Schuko around 1989.

== See also ==
- Europlug
- AC power plugs and sockets
- GOST 7396 Soviet version
- IEC 60906-1 proposed replacement since 1986
