= DS 107-2-D1 =

Danish power plug and socket type

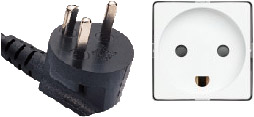
Danish Type K 3-pin grounded plug and socket outlet

DS 107-2-D1 (also known as DS 60884-2 D1) is the Danish national standard for AC power plugs and sockets. They are defined by the IEC as the Type K plug and are used across the Kingdom of Denmark. They are rated for 250 V and 16 A.

The 107-2-D1 plug has similar power pins as the German Schuko and French Type E plugs but has an arc-shaped earthing pin as part of the plug. Europlugs are compatible with Danish sockets, but grounded European plugs such as the Schuko pose a health risk (if used without a Danish adapter) due to the lack of an earth connection. Sockets are polarized in the same way as the British BS 1363 ones: if earth is at the bottom, live is at the left of the socket.

== Specification ==
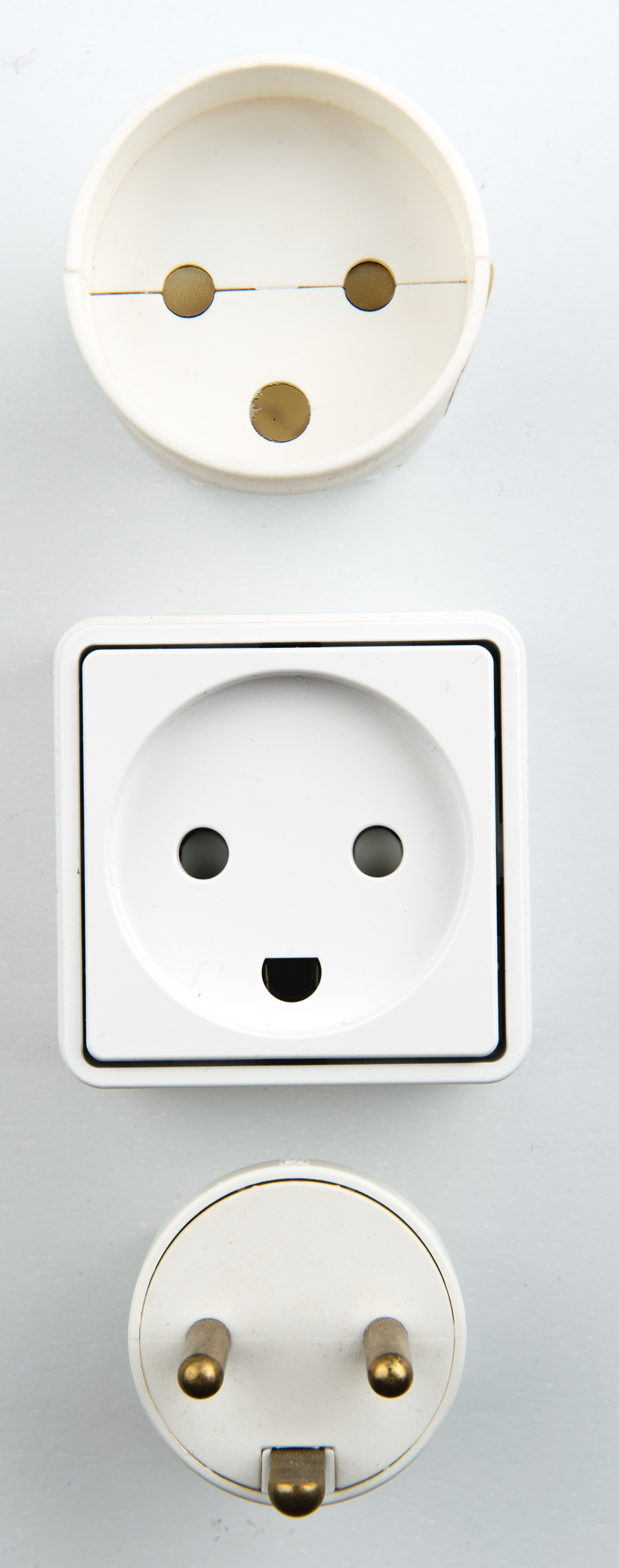
Danish 107-2-D1, standard DK 2-1a, with round power pins and a half-round earth pin

The standard for a Danish plug is described in the DEMKO (Note: Electrical Equipment Control) specification section (Afsnit) 107-2-D1 (SRAF1962/DB 16/87 DN10A-R) and is only used in continental Denmark and the Danish archipelago, the Faroe Islands and Greenland.

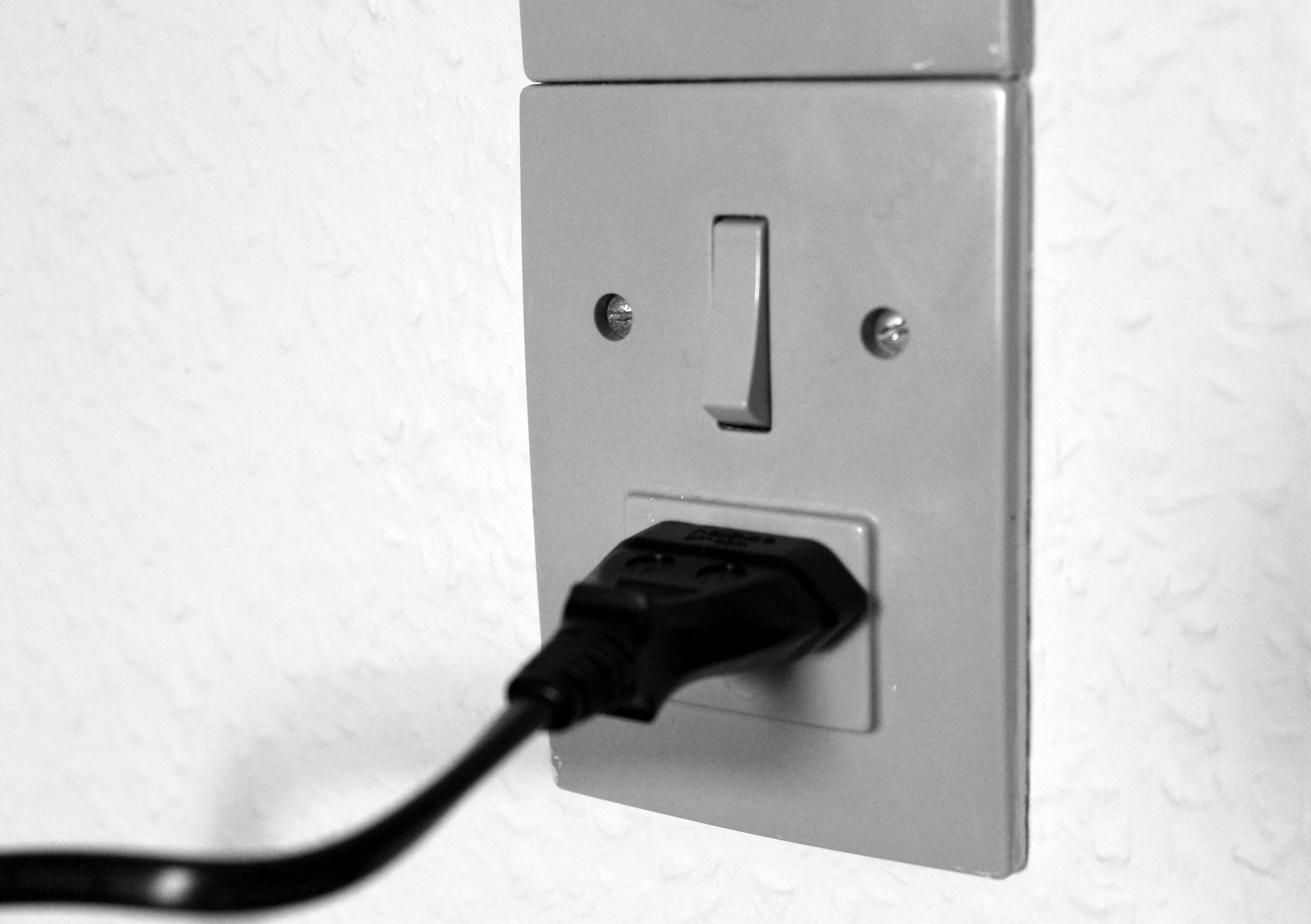
Old Danish unearthed and switched socket

The plugs in Denmark can be loaded with a maximum of 13 A/250 V. The plugs are similar to the German/French CEE 7/7 combination plugs, but the grounding is created with a 3rd pin.

Traditionally all Danish sockets were equipped with a switch to prevent touching live pins when connecting/disconnecting the plug. Today, sockets without switch are allowed, but they must be recessed to prevent touching the live pins. Older sockets need not be earthed, but all sockets, including old installations, were ordered by law to be protected by earth-fault interrupters (HFI or HPFI in Danish) by 1 July 2008.

The Danish standard provides for sockets to have child-resistant shutters. Sockets are polarized in the same way as British ones: if earth is at the bottom, live is at the left of the socket.

The live conductor, neutral conductor, and protective earth conductor are designed as contact pins on the plug. The contact pin for the protective earth is shorter, but it is still positioned first because it reaches the protective earth socket in the Type K socket first. The plug determines the polarity.

== History ==
Lauritz Knudsen (LK, today part of Schneider Electric Danmark) built the first power outlet in Denmark in the year 1910. The standardised system of today appeared in the middle of the century. They were manufactured by Lauritz Knudsen and Nordisk Elektricitetsselskab (the latter merged into the former in 1968).

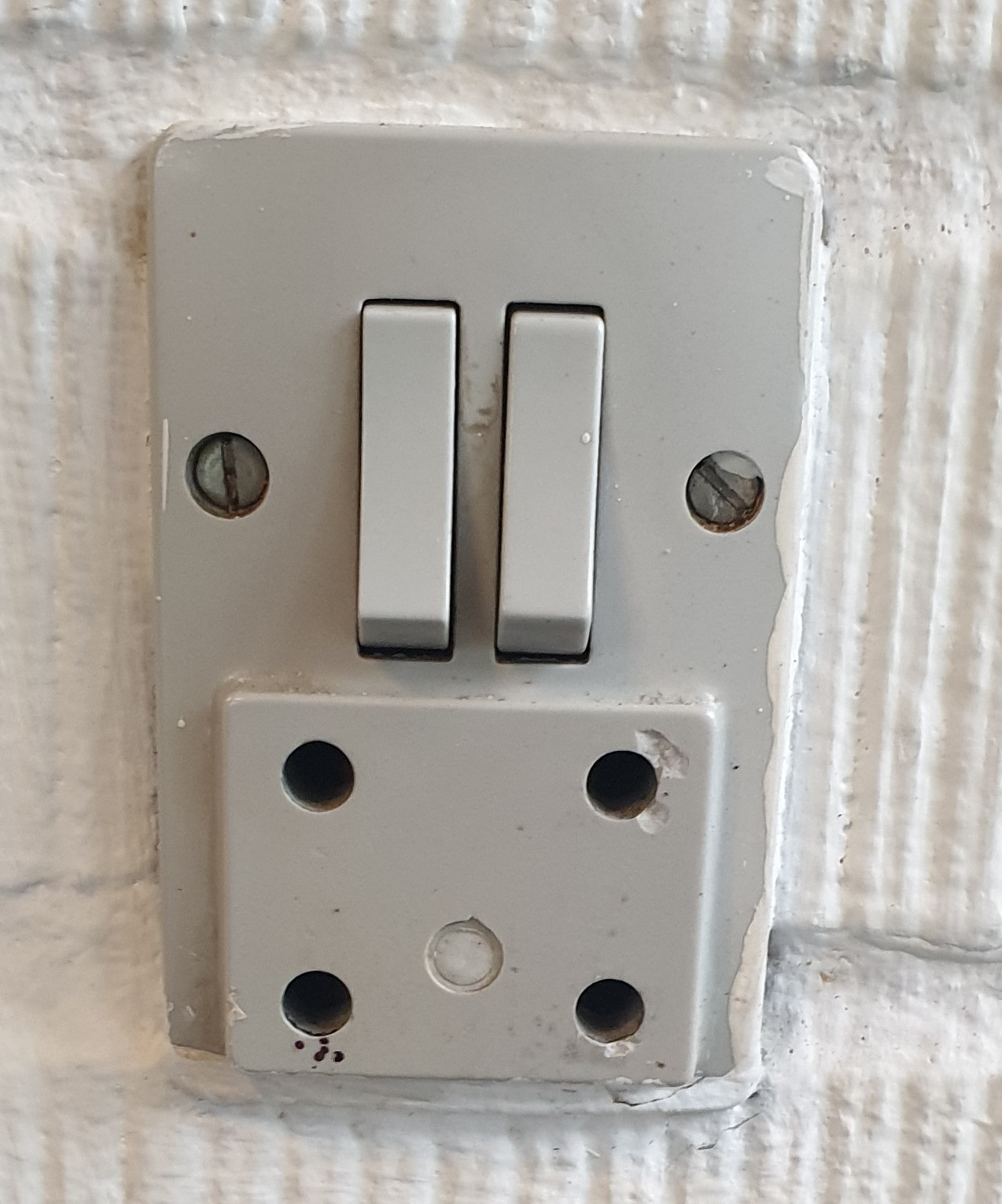
Dual ungrounded Danish sockets with switches, no longer permitted for new installations

The requirement of grounding in all sockets was only recently enforced. Since 1 March 1994 all newly installed sockets in Denmark are required to have the earth pin. However such sockets were still permitted to be used without an active protective conductor. This changed as of 28 February 2009 and since then all new installations in Denmark must be connected to an active protective conductor.

Since 1 July 2008, French-style CEE 7/5 sockets may also be installed in Denmark, and since 15 November 2011, German-style CEE 7/3 (Schuko) sockets may be installed as well. These were allowed because little electrical equipment sold to private users is equipped with a Danish plug. However the Danish Type K remains by far the most common socket in Danish homes.

Since 1 January 2026, new sockets with both IPX0 and IPX1 water protection ratings must be child-proof (previously the requirement was only for IPX0).

== Diameters ==
Grounded Danish wall socket with switch

Like in most European plugs, the power pins of Danish plugs are 19 mm (0.75 in) long and spaced 19 mm (0.75 in) apart, with a diameter of 4.8 mm (0.19 in). The earthing pin is part of the plug; it is D-shaped, 14 mm (0.55 in) long, and offset from the power pins by 13 mm (0.51 in). Despite being shorter than the line and neutral pins, the earth pin is still the one that makes contact first. It is 4 mm (0.16 in) thick with a diameter of 6.5 mm (0.26 in).

Classic unearthed 2 pin plugs that were rated at 6 A had 4.0 mm (0.16 in) pins.

== Compatibility ==
The unearthed European Europlug and CEE 7/17 ("contour") plug can safely be used with Danish sockets. Physically the sockets also accept earthed CEE 7/4 (Schuko), CEE 7/6 (Belgian/French), and CEE 7/7 (Schuko-French hybrid) plugs, but the protective earth conductor is not connected. This can create a life-threatening situation in the event of a short circuit in the appliance. Therefore, such plugs must only be used with a suitable adapter. News sites and industry magazines have warned that, due to the lack of grounding, plugging them directly into a Type K socket can give noticeable electric shocks to the point of pain, be dangerous to the point of hospitalizing, or even be life-threatening.

Unearthed Danish Type K plugs (without an earth pin) also fit into Schuko and French sockets thanks to their compact shape. An exception are some older Danish models that do not fit into Schuko sockets because they are too wide.

== DK 2-5a computer plug and DK 2-8a hospital plug ==
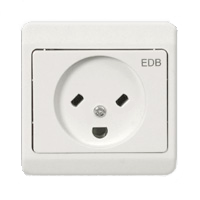
Danish computer socket

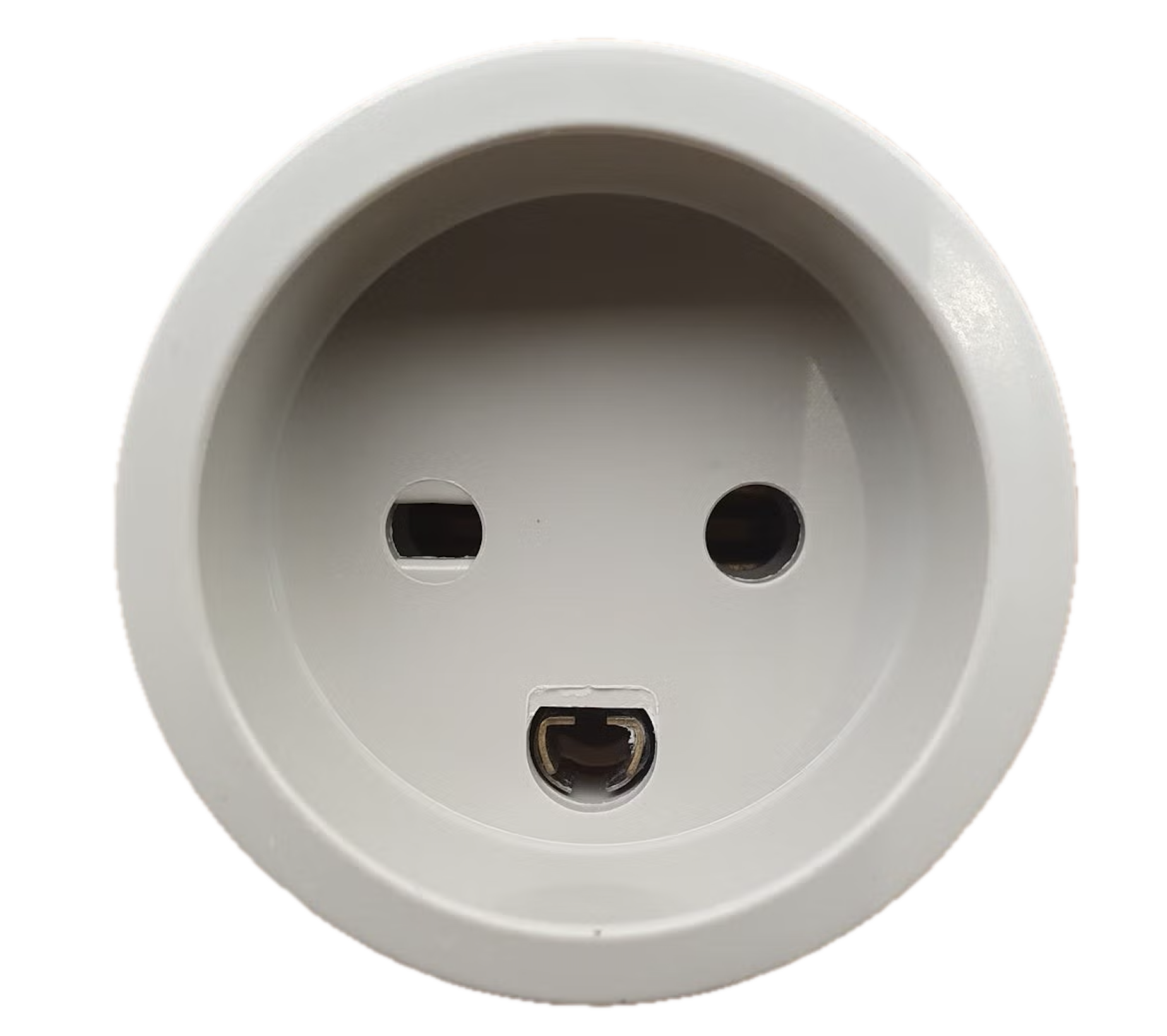
Danish hospital socket

A variation (standard DK 2-5a) of the Danish 107-2-D1 plug is for use only on surge protected computer sockets. The plug is often used in companies (but rarely in private homes) and is independent of the standard power supply. They are labelled EDB (standing for Elektronisk Databehandeling). DK 2-5a plugs and sockets are developed with "flat" angled pins, which deliberately prevents the regular round plugs from being inserted into a computer socket, but computer plugs do fit in a normal socket.

There is another variation (standard DK 2-8a) for hospital equipment with a rectangular left pin, which is used for life support equipment. It is wired to a local circuit that automatically switches to a backup power source in case of a blackout. Similarly to the computer socket, normal plugs do not fit in a DK 2-8a socket to prevent unauthorised use but DK 2-8a plugs fit in a normal Danish socket.
