= Europlug =

Type of electrical plug

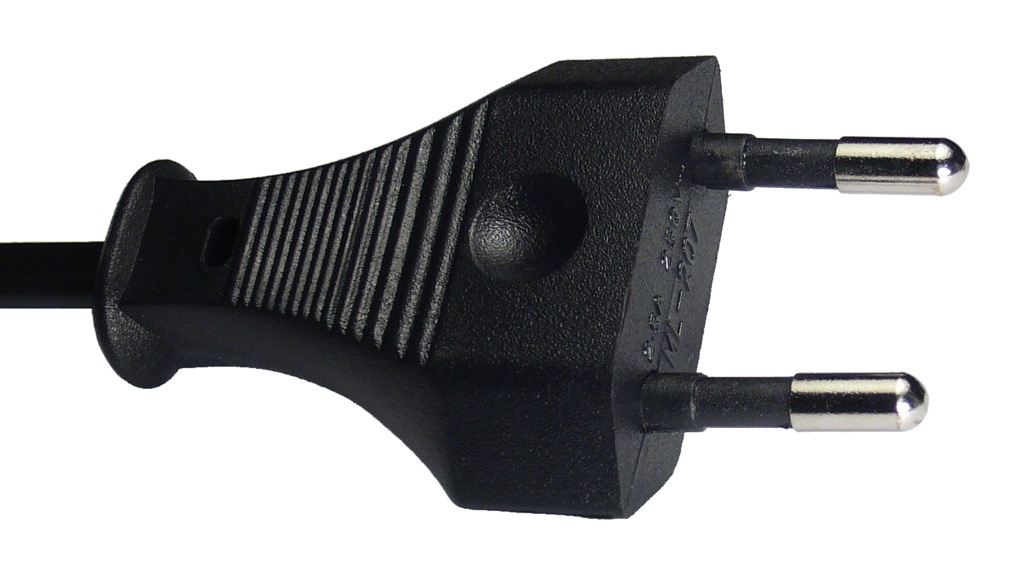
Example of a Europlug

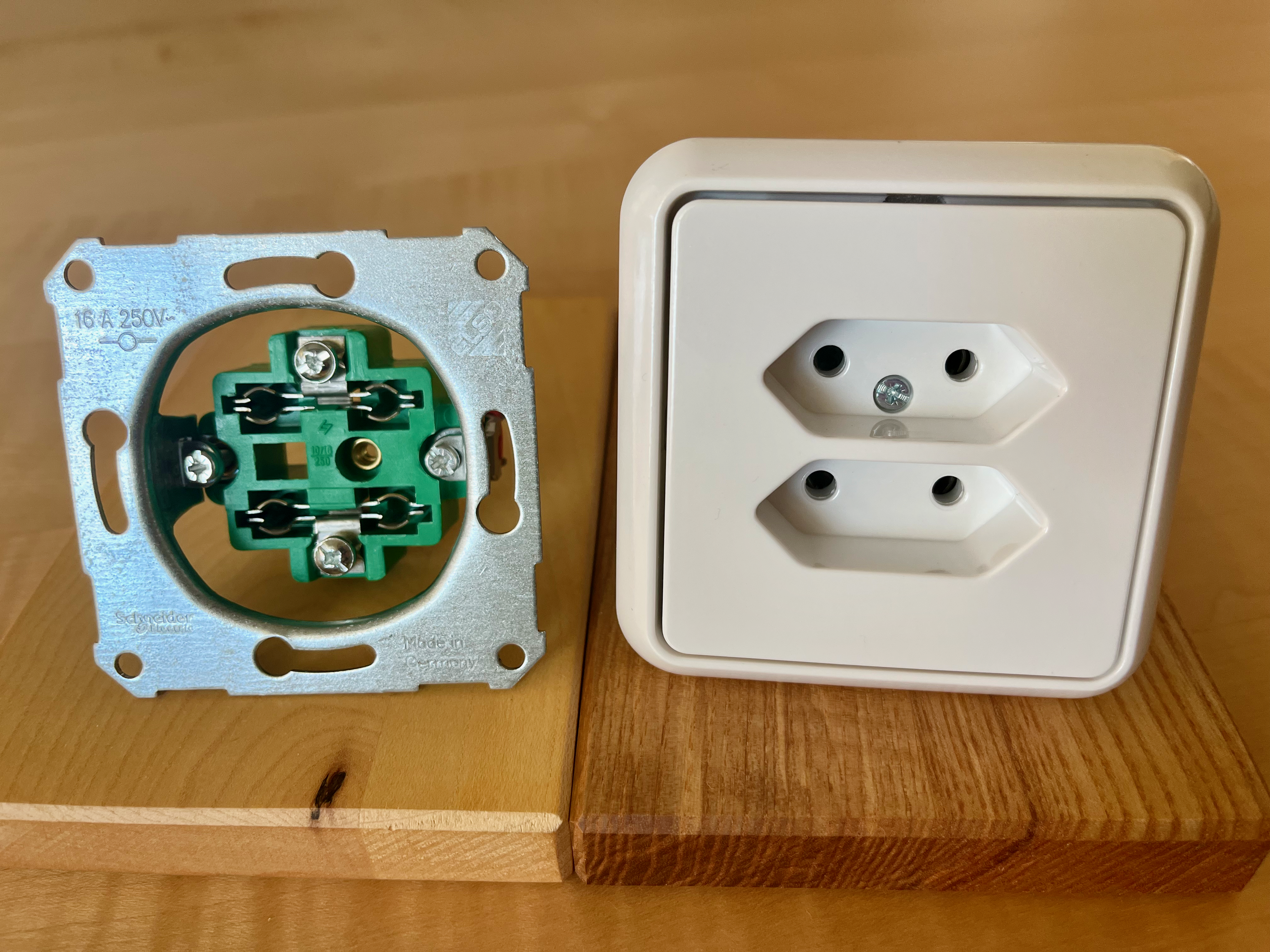
An unofficial double "Eurosocket". While these are not defined by any standard, they are nevertheless produced and sold by some companies. Since they will also accept Swiss Type 11 plugs due to the nearly identical form factor, they should be rated for at least 10 A to allow safe usage (this one is rated for 16 A).

The Europlug, also known as Type C by the IEC, is a flat, non-rewirable two-pole, round-pin domestic AC power plug, rated for voltages up to 250 V and currents up to 2.5 A. It is a compromise design for low-power Class II appliances. It is defined by the CEE 7 standard under the official designation CEE 7/16 Alternative II. The standard requires Europlugs to be non-rewirable (plugs cannot be opened to change the wiring) and permanently attached to a power cord or appliance; anything else is non-compliant.

The Europlug is the most widely used plug internationally. The standard does not define a specific socket outlet; it is compatible with all round-pin domestic power socket used across Europe with the exception of the 16 A CEI 23-50 socket found in Italy. The plug is also used as standard in countries including Indonesia, Russia and most post-Soviet states, DR Congo, Egypt, Iran and Turkey.

The plug is often used on the housing of small plug-in power supplies. Though standardization excludes it, there are cable couplings for Europlugs and rewireable plugs available.

== History ==
The Europlug design, intended for use with socket-outlets meeting other standards, appeared first in 1963 as Alternative II of Standard Sheet XVI in the second edition of CEE Publication 7 by the contributing members of Austria, Belgium, Czechoslovakia, Denmark, Federal Republic of Germany, Finland, France, Greece, Hungary, Italy, Netherlands, Norway, Poland, Portugal, Sweden, Switzerland, United Kingdom, and Yugoslavia. The Europlug is therefore sometimes also referred to as the "CEE 7/16 Alternative II plug" or simply as the "CEE 7/16 plug". It was also described in 1975 as plug C5 in IEC Technical Report 83. In 1990 it was defined by Cenelec standard EN 50075 which has national equivalents in most European countries, as described in IEC 60083 which superseded IEC/TR 83 (and no longer uses the C5 designation).

The Europlug is unusual as the standard specifies a plug only; there is no socket/outlet defined specifically for use with it. The Europlug is attached to the housing of small power devices of Class II with maximum current of 2.5 A.

== Design considerations ==
The dimensions of the Europlug were chosen for compatibility and safe use, such that with continental European domestic power sockets:

- reliable contact is established when the plug is fully inserted;
- no live conductive parts are accessible while the plug is inserted into each type of socket;
- it is not possible to establish a connection between one pin and a live socket contact while the other pin is accessible.

Additionally, the design allows for a more compact and less bulky design of mobile phone chargers, than the BS 1363 form factor in the UK.

Europlugs are only designed for low-power (less than 2.5 A) Class II (double-insulated) devices that operate at normal room temperature and do not require a protective-earth connection.

== Specifications ==
Diagram of the Europlug specifications

The pins of the Europlug are 19 mm long. They consist of a 9 mm long conductive tip of 4 mm diameter with a rounded ending, followed by a 10 mm long flexible insulated shaft of not more than 3.8 mm diameter. The two pins are not exactly parallel and converge slightly; their centres are 17 to 18 mm apart at the tip and 18 to 19 mm apart at the base. The elasticity of the converging pins provides sufficient contact force for the Europlug's current rating with a variety of socket-hole arrangements. The entire plug is 35.3 mm wide and 13.7 mm high, and must not exceed these dimensions within 18 mm behind its front plane (this allows for the recesses on many European socket types). The left and right side of the plug are formed by surfaces that are at 45° relative to the horizontal plane.

== Compatibility ==
Map of Europlug-compatible sockets

=== Types E, F, and K ===
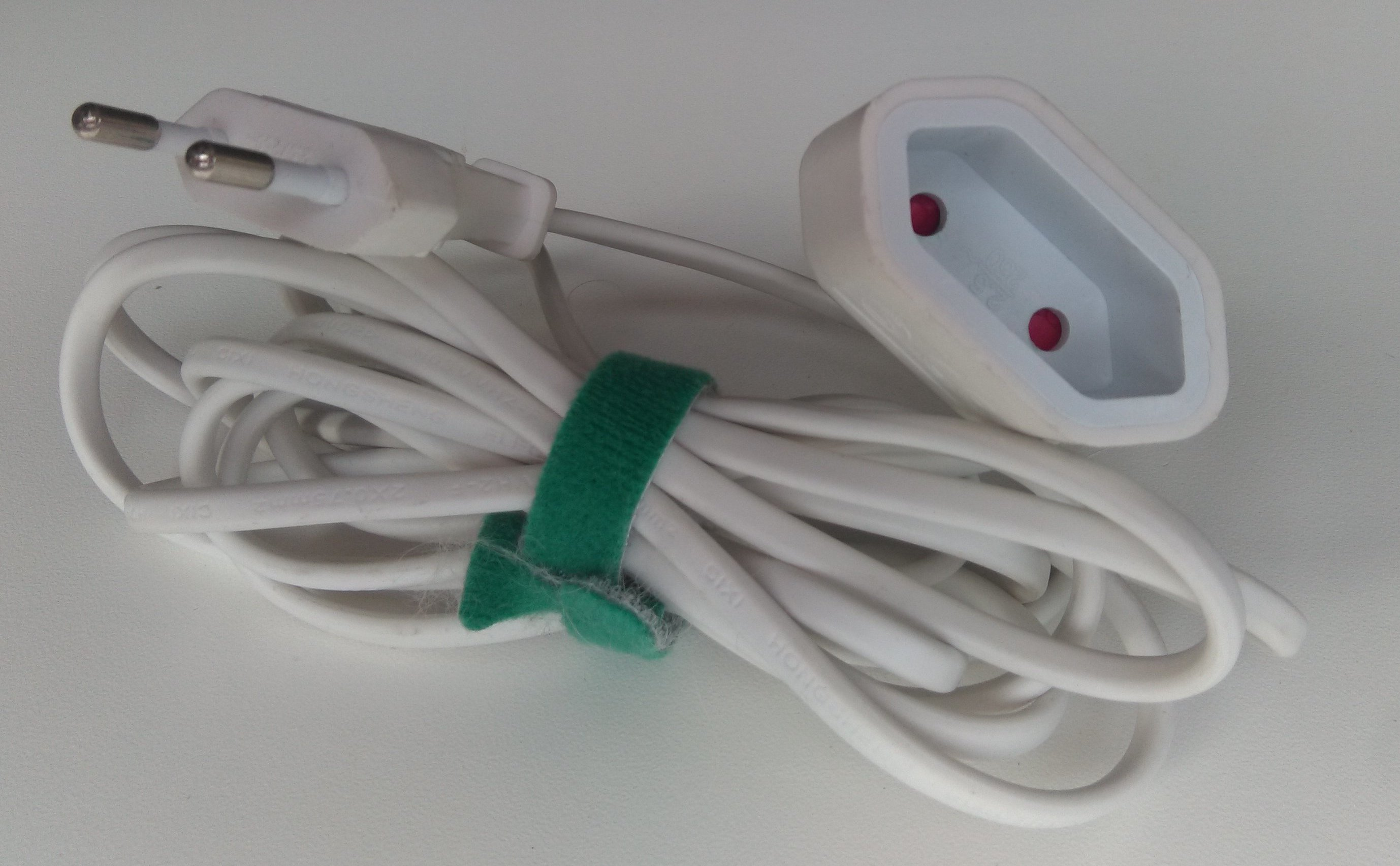
An extension cord with a Europlug at one end and a corresponding socket (not defined by the standard) at the other

The Europlug is designed to be compatible with Belgian/French (Type E), Schuko (Type F), and Danish (Type K) sockets. They have 5.5 mm holes with centres spaced 19 mm apart. The inner distance between the holes is thus 13.5 mm, which is exactly the inner distance between the converged pins on the Europlug. This ensures a stable connection despite the plug's smaller pin width.

=== Type D ===
The Europlug cannot be safely used with Type D sockets, found in India and several other countries. These sockets have 5.1 mm holes with centres spaced 19.1 mm apart, which means a Europlug can be inserted if the sockets do not have protective shutters. However, the power pins of Type D are over 4 mm shorter than those of the Europlug, therefore the plug may not fit fully into such sockets and a stable connection may not be made. Moreover, the socket design might not allow the plug to grip it because of the larger hole diameter of Type D.

=== Type G (British) ===
The Europlug is physically not compatible with BS 1363 13 A sockets, used in e.g. the UK, Ireland and Malta. British law requires a suitable fuse to be fitted in each plug to protect the appliance's flexible cord; Europlugs do not contain such fuses. BS 1363 sockets contain a child-safety shutter; clause 13.7.2 of BS 1363-2 requires that Europlugs will not open the shutters. In some types of BS 1363 sockets (but not all) the safety mechanism can be tampered with so that a Europlug may then be forced into the open line and neutral ports. The UK Electrical Safety Council has drawn attention to the fire risk associated with forcing Europlugs into BS 1363 sockets. There is also a risk of damage to both the plug and socket. This is because while a Europlug might fit physically into a BS 1363 socket without shutters (especially if some force is used), the round pins have only a very small contact area with the rectangular sockets. The plug is only rated for 2.5 A and the British sockets are fused at 32 A.

The British consumer protection legislation requires that most domestic electrical goods sold in the UK must be provided with fitted plugs to BS 1363-1. The exception is that shavers, electric toothbrushes and similar personal hygiene products may be supplied with a Europlug as an alternative to the BS 4573 plug (see below). Fused conversion plugs to BS 1363-5 are available for Europlugs, and equipment fitted with these may be legally sold in the UK.

Adaptors that do not meet British specifications (such as adaptors without shutters, sold with SAA approval in Australia) may accept Europlugs when set in the British position.

==== BS 4573 (British shaver) ====
The Europlug is not designed to be compatible with BS 4573 sockets. These sockets have 5.1 mm holes with centres spaced 16.7 mm apart, meaning a reliable contact might not be possible. Most 2-pin UK shaver sockets will accept either BS 4573 plugs or Europlugs, but are rated for a maximum of 0.2 A. UK consumer protection legislation allows for shavers, electric toothbrushes and similar personal hygiene products to be supplied with a Europlug as an alternative to the BS 4573 plug. This has the advantage that these devices can also be used in other European countries.

=== Type H (Israeli-Palestinian) ===
Originally these sockets had flat openings and were not compatible with the Europlug. In 1989, a new version was designed to be compatible with the Europlug. Newer sockets have 5 mm round holes with centres spaced 19 mm apart. The minimum distance between the holes is thus 14 mm, while the minimum distance between the converged pins on the Europlug is 13.5 mm, allowing it to grip the socket despite its smaller pin width.

=== Type J (Swiss) ===
The Europlug is designed to be compatible with Type 11 and 12 (outdated single-phase sockets, 10 A) and Type 13 (recessed single-phase socket, 10 A; Type J) and is consequently compatible with all socket types defined by SN 441011, also including Type 15 (three-phase, 10 A), Type 21 and 23 (single-phase, 16 A) and Type 25 (three-phase, 16 A). The diameter of the openings of the 10 A sockets is 4.5 mm and the openings of the 16 A sockets are 4.5 x 5.5 mm wide. The norm space between line (one-phase) or L1 (three-phase) and neutral is 19 mm.

=== Type L (Italian) ===
The Europlug is designed to be compatible with 10 A Type L sockets, commonly found in Italy. They have 4.5 mm holes with centres spaced 19 mm apart. It is also compatible with dual 10 A/16 A sockets, but it does not fit into the 16 A–only variant, whose holes are spaced farther apart.

=== Type N ===
All variants of type N sockets (see IEC 60906-1) as used in South Africa, Brazil, and Paraguay (rated for 10 to 20 A and with a pin diameter of 4 to 4.8 mm) accept Europlugs.

=== Type O (Thai) ===
Thailand uses hybrid receptacles which accept Europlugs. However, since Thai sockets also accept NEMA connectors (type A and B), whose blades are closer together, Europlugs might experience loose contact.

== See also ==
- AC power plugs and sockets
- Schuko – the system of CEE 7/3 sockets and CEE 7/4 plugs
- CEE 7 standard AC plugs and sockets § CEE 7/7 plug (compatible with E and F) – a hybrid between the Schuko (Type F) and French (Type E) plug, the earthed plug used throughout most of Europe
- CEE 7 standard AC plugs and sockets § CEE 7/17 unearthed plug – round unearthed plug that fits into Schuko and French sockets and is rated for up to 16 A, generally used in Europe for Class II appliances that need more than the 2.5 A provided by the Europlug
- IEC 60906-1 (Type N) – modern standard for earthed sockets and earthed or unearthed plugs that are compatible with the Europlug and just a bit higher than it; designed to become widespread in countries that use 220–240 V, but so far used only in Brazil and South Africa
