= Regulation (EU) No. 305/2011 =

305/2011
- Title: Construction Product Regulation (CPR)
- Made by: European Council, European Parliament
- Made under: Article 114
- Journal reference: L 88/5, 4/4/2011

History
- Date made: 9 March 2011
- Entry into force: 24 April 2011

Other legislation
- Replaces: Construction Products Directive (89/106/EEC)
- Replaced by: Regulation (EU) 2024/3110

Regulation No. 305/2011 (Construction Products Regulation, or CPR) of the European Parliament and of the Council of the European Union is a regulation of 9 March 2011 which lays down harmonised conditions for the marketing of construction products and replaces Construction Products Directive (89/106/EEC). This EU regulation is designed to simplify and clarify the existing framework for the placing on the market of construction products. (Note: EU regulations are supranational laws which come into force automatically for all EU Member States without requiring any further national transposition.) It replaced the earlier (1989) Construction Products Directive (89/106/EEC).

The provisions of this regulation seek to:

- Clarify the affixing of CE marking to construction products.
- Introduce the need to issue a declaration of performance as a basis for CE marking.
- Define clear rules for the assessment and verification of constancy of performance (AVCP) systems applicable to construction products (former Attestation of Conformity AoC).
- Define the role and responsibilities of manufacturers, distributors, importers, notified bodies, technical assessment bodies, market surveillance and Member States' authorities as regards the application of this EU regulation.
- Introduce simplified procedures enabling cost reductions for businesses, especially SMEs.
- Provide a clear framework for the harmonised technical specifications (harmonised standards and European Assessment Documents) and a common technical language for construction products.

== Free movement of products ==
The main objective of the CPR is the removal of technical barriers to trade in order to guarantee the free movement of construction products within the common internal market due to differing product and test standards, approval processes and conformity documents in the various member states. Key elements to this are the Harmonized Product Standard and the European Assessment Documents. Harmonized standards are established by the European standardization bodies CEN (European Committee for Standardization) and CENELEC (European Committee for Electrotechnical Standardization) with the involvement of stakeholders. Where a manufacturer would like to declare the characteristics for a construction product not yet covered by a harmonized product standard, he may use the procedure to establish a European technical assessment.

Given that it was not possible to create this harmonization at national level, these measures have been taken on a European level following the principle of subsidiarity of Article 5 of the treaty of the European Union. The same treaty specifies that the European Union shall not interfere with the competences of its member states, which are sovereign in defining all means to assure that constructions satisfy their set objectives for health, security and protection. This is why the CPR concentrates exclusively on the performances of construction products and the use of the corresponding CE marking.

== Basic requirements for construction works ==
The CPR lists seven essential basic requirements for construction works ("BRCW") which construction works must satisfy in general, but at the same time the CPR leaves it to the Member States to select how they are applied nationally.

1. Mechanical resistance and stability
2. Safety in case of fire
3. Hygiene, health and the environment
4. Safety and accessibility in use
5. Protection against noise
6. Energy economy and heat retention
7. Sustainable use of natural resources

Further the CPR states that Construction works as a whole and in their separate parts must be fit for their intended use (...). Those characteristics which relate to these basic requirements for construction works are defined as essential characteristics of construction products. The CE marking expresses the conformity of the characteristics of the building product to these essential characteristics and the fulfillment of the applicable requirements of the harmonized EU legislation. Thus, with the CE marking of construction products, the manufacturer takes on both responsibilities, the conformity of the product and the fulfillment of the essential characteristics.

Member states cannot prohibit the "making available" (i.e., sale and distribution) of such CE marked products and cannot prohibit the use of such products, as long as the declared characteristics satisfy all national requirements.

== Declaration of performance (DoP) ==
To affix the CE marking to a construction product, the manufacturer is obliged to draw up a Declaration of Performance (DoP) when a construction product is covered by a harmonized standard or conforms to a European Technical Assessment. Any information about the product's performance in relation to the essential characteristics may be provided only in the form of a declaration of performance. The CE marking shall be applied to the product itself and where this should not be possible to the packaging or accompanying documents.

The declaration shall be

- supplied in paper form
- supplied by electronic means
- made available on a website (according to Commission Delegated Regulation (EU) No 157/2014)

The declaration must be written in the language of the member state where the product is made available.

The DoP shall be drawn up according to the prescribed model as set out in annex III of the CPR (amended by Commission Delegated Regulation (EU) No 574/2014 of 21 February 2014) and contain at least the following:

- reference to the product type
- system of assessment
- reference number and date of the harmonized standard
- the intended use
- the list of essential characteristics
- the performance of at least one of the essential characteristics

In order to be able to draw up a Declaration of Performance, manufacturers have to go through a process which includes phases of documentation, third-party verification and finally certification. The CPR details five different assessment procedures with decreasing severity (System 1+, 1, 2+, 3, 4). Tasks to be developed are described in Annex V of the regulation amended by Commission Delegated Regulation (EU) 568/2014.

Depending on the applicable assessment procedure, the manufacturer must develop technical documentation describing in detail the construction product, its method of production, eventual test reports performed at third party laboratories (ITT – initial type test), their classification of the results (classification report) and eventual extensions (EXAP - extended application report). This first phase is followed by a factory audit, with which the appointed notified body verifies if the quality system of the manufacturer at his factory can assure over time constancy in order to preserve for the serial production the declared essential characteristics of the tested specimen. A positive audit leads to the issuing by the notified body of the Certificate of Constancy of Performance with which the manufacturer is authorized to issue the Declaration of Performance for his certified construction product.

== Responsibilities of economic operators ==
This EU regulation distinguishes two moments during the distribution of construction products: making available and placing on the market and associates for each phase different responsibilities to the economic operators involved in the process. Making available on the market means any supply for distribution or use on the Union market in the course of commercial activity be it for payment or free of charge. The first time a product is made available is therefore defined as placing on the market. Only manufacturers or importers can place products on the market, whereas distributors, importers and manufacturers can make them available thereafter.

Contrary to common practice and knowledge the manufacturer is not exclusively responsible for a compliant making available of the product. Also, an importer or distributor may be considered to act as a manufacturer and is thus subject to all obligations for manufacturers in cases where he places a product on the market under his name or trademark or modifies a construction product already placed on the market. Even though not expressively stated in the CPR, the DoP and all accompanying documents are considered legal documents and shall not be altered but supplied as they have been provided by the manufacturer.

	Manufacturer	Importer	Distributor	Representative
Definition	manufacturer or marketer under his name of construction product	places product from a third country on the Union market	entity other than importer or manufacturer making products available	acting on behalf of manufacturer with a written mandate
Responsibility	draw up DoP; draw up technical documentation; ensure constancy of production; label correctly products; supply instructions or safety info; withdraw or recall products; inform authority in case of problems; provide documentation to authorities	import only compliant products; ensure that documentation is available by manufacturer; indicate contact details of importer on product; supply instructions or safety info; ensure compliant storage and transport of product; where appropriate carry out sample tests; keep DoP available; withdraw or recall products; inform authority in case of problems; provide documentation to authorities	act with due care; ensure that documentation is available by manufacturer; ensure that CE marking applied to product; provide documentation to authorities; inform manufacturer in case of problems; inform authority in case of problems; ensure compliant storage and transport of product	keep DoP available; provide documentation to authorities; cooperate with authorities

== Responsibilities of Member States ==
Member States play an important role for the functioning of the common market of the European Union. Member States shall not introduce national laws which inhibit the free movement of construction products and shall not specify other methods than those mentioned in the harmonized standards to determine the performances for essential characteristics. When a harmonized product standard becomes available, national standardization bodies are under the obligation to transpose the standard and after the end of the Coexistence Period (period within which both the old national and the new European standards may be used) eventual conflicting national standards shall be withdrawn and conflicting national provisions ended.

Further, Member States are obliged to designate Product Contact Points, first prescribed by Regulation 764/2008 on national technical rules, which provide easily understandable information on the provisions aimed at fulfilling the basic requirements for construction works and must guarantee fair competition through the establishment of Market Surveillance Authorities.

Finally, Member States are to designate for their territory one Notifying Authority which is it be responsible for setting up, certifying and monitoring of Notified Bodies. These notified bodies are institutes authorised to carry out assessments and verifications of manufacturers of construction products and the construction products they intend to CE mark.

== Market surveillance ==
Provisions related to market surveillance included in the regulation were amended by Regulation (EU) 2019/1020 on market surveillance and compliance of products. The new legal text introduces additional articles on the surveillance of distant sales (online), coordination of authorities, market surveillance powers and the creation of the Union Product Compliance Network. The legal text also amends Article 56(1) of Regulation (EU) No 305/2011.

== See also ==
- Building material
