= SANS 164 =

South African standard for AC power plugs and sockets

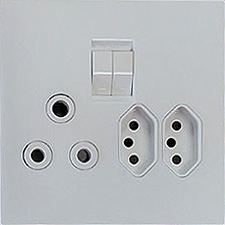
SANS 164-1 (old, left) and -2 (new, right) sockets. The designs are equivalent to Type M and Type N respectively.

SANS 164 (Note: South African National Standard 164: Plugs and socket outlets for household and similar purposes for use in South Africa) is the South African national standard for domestic AC power plugs and sockets, set by the South African Bureau of Standards. Modern connectors in South Africa make use of a Type N plug design whereas historically the larger Type M (based on British standard BS 546) was used, superseded since the 1990s. The standard is also adopted and used in Lesotho and Eswatini, but only Type M plugs are used in these countries.

== History ==
As a former British colony, South Africa's electricity standards are of British derivation, and it uses 220/230 V at 50 Hz AC. However, while the UK changed over to the rectangular-pin BS 1363 plug after World War II, South Africa has retained the older round-pin BS 546 style. This round-pin style was current in both the UK and South Africa when South Africa gained independence in 1931.

Consequently, through much of the rest of the 20th century, both the smaller BS 546 5 ampere plug and socket, and the larger BS 546 15 ampere plug and socket, remained commonly in use in South Africa until the SANS 164-1 and SANS 164-2 standards were strictly defined in 1992. In 1994 these two new modern SANS 164 standards were implemented. Through the 1980s and into the 1990s the SANS 164-1/BS 546 15 ampere standard was largely in the process of replacing the smaller BS 546 5 ampere standard, and thus it became the most prominently utilised standard from 1994 on.

South Africa has adopted the IEC 60906-1 (Type N) plug and socket as SANS 164-2 in 1992. More recently however it has been selected by the South African Government as the "preferred standard" in 2013, and is being pushed to slowly replace the SANS 164-1/BS 546 15 ampere standard. Although the sockets are compatible with the Europlugs, which are already in common use as SANS 164-5, and Brazil has adopted a modified form of the same IEC 60906-1 standard, South Africa is the first country to adopt the IEC 60906-1 standard directly and implement it.

== Specifications ==
The standard is divided into seven parts:

SANS 164-0: General and Safety Requirements
This incorporates IEC 60884 for definitions and general requirements. First implemented in 2006, it effectively replaces an earlier separate standard set by the South African Bureau of Standards (SABS for short) for plug and socket safety (SABS 1664).

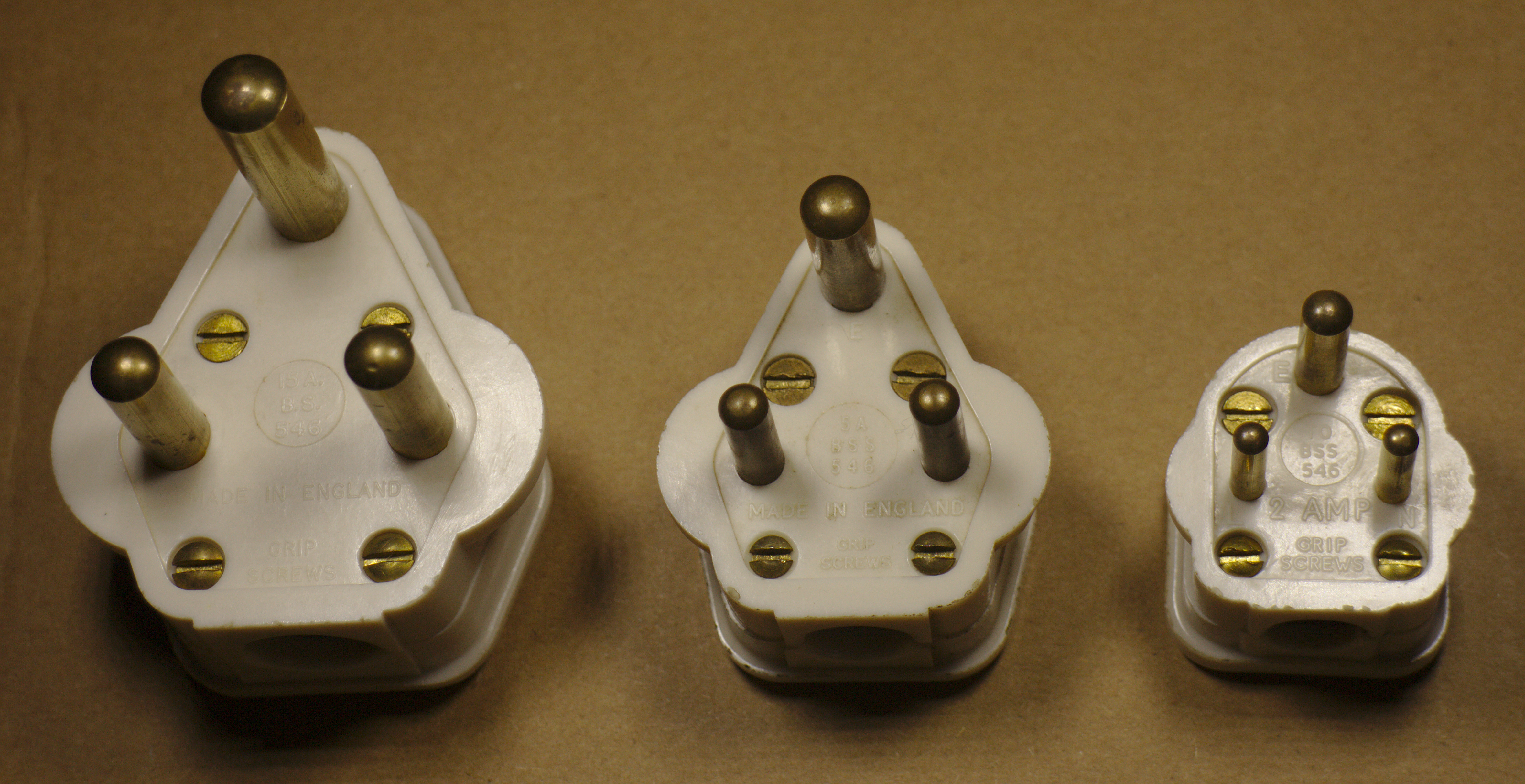
SANS 164-1 and -3 (BS 546) plugs

SANS 164-1: Conventional System, 16 A 250 V

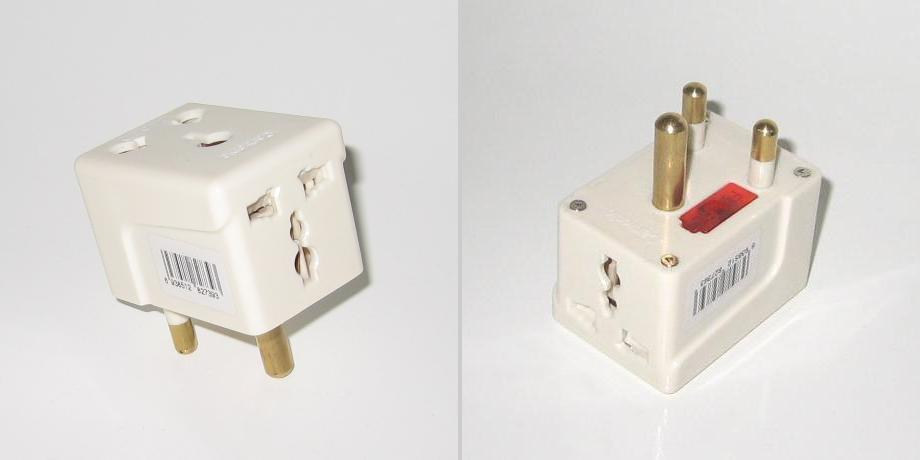
16A SANS 164-1 travel adaptor, to be used in "Type M" sockets

This is identical to the BS 546 15 ampere plug and socket, although in South Africa it is rated for 16 A for compatibility with the IEC 60898 standard current ratings. By 1992 the BS 546 15 ampere system had been codified by the SABS as SANS 164-1. This standard remains in effect today and it is the most commonly used plug and socket system currently in use in South Africa. However, after a transition period of 10 to 20 years, it is planned that SANS 164-2 will replace SANS 164-1 as the dominant standard.
This plug-and-socket system is equivalent to the IEC "Plug Type M" system.

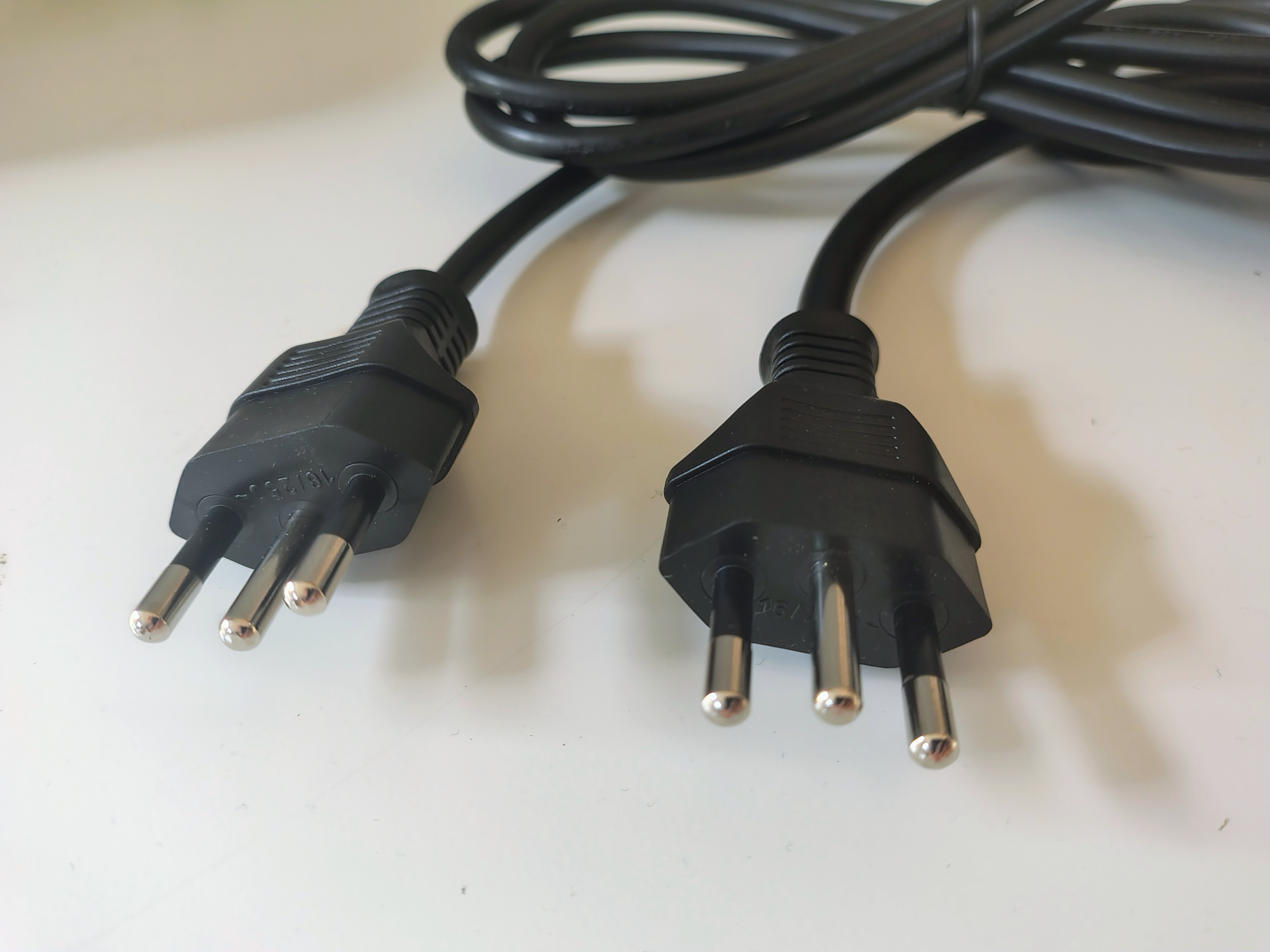
Three-pin 16 A SANS 164-2 plugs

SANS 164-2: Conventional System, 16 A 250 V
This specifies the IEC 60906-1 plug system, both 2-pin unearthed and 3-pin earthed. Codified by the SABS as a South African standard since 1992, it was designated the "preferred standard" in 2013. Since 2015, South Africa has been in a planned transition period lasting 10 to 20 years (till either 2025 or 2035) to replace SANS 164-1 with SANS 164-2 as the dominant plug and socket system. The sockets are compatible with the SANS 164-5 Europlug which is also currently in common use in South Africa.
This plug-and-socket system is equivalent to the IEC "Plug Type N" system.

SANS 164-3: Conventional System, 6 A 250 V
This is identical to the BS 546 5 ampere plug and socket, although it is rated for 6 A in South Africa for compatibility with the IEC 60898 standard current ratings. This standard was first codified by the SABS in 2006. Although the SABS standard was only defined in 2006, plugs and sockets of this form are normally only found in older installations of South African households, as both the BS 546 5 ampere (equivalent to SANS 164-3) and the BS 546 15 ampere (equivalent to SANS 164-1) were common in South Africa until 1992, when SANS 164-1 became the dominant standard for most household applications. Thus, plugs and sockets of the SANS 164-3/BS 546 5 ampere type are not commonly seen in households in South Africa anymore, having largely been replaced by SANS 164-1 in the early 1990s.
This plug-and-socket system is equivalent to the IEC "Plug Type D" system.

SANS 164-4: Dedicated System, 16 A 250 V
These plugs and sockets, unique to South Africa, are similar to the SANS 164-1 connectors, but have the earth pin flattened on one side to prevent conventional plugs from being inserted into dedicated sockets. Dedicated plugs are, however, compatible with conventional sockets. This standard was first codified by the SABS in 2006.
These receptacles are commonly used for uninterruptible, isolated or otherwise filtered power. They come in three varieties, with corresponding colours. Although the standard does not define their use, some are common:
- Red, flat on top: Generic "special power", commonly used for computers and other electronics
- Blue, flat rotated 53° clockwise: commonly used for uninterruptible power
- Black, flat rotated 53° counterclockwise: commonly used for transformer-isolated power

SANS 164-5: Two-pole, non-rewireable plugs, 2,5 A 250 V AC, with cord, for connection of class II equipment
These plugs are identical to the CEE7/16 Alternative II Europlug. Only plugs are defined; they are to be used with SANS 164-2 or 164-6 sockets. This standard was first codified in South Africa by the SABS in 2006.
This plug is equivalent to the plug defined by the IEC as "Plug Type C" (Europlug).

SANS 164-6: Two-pole systems, 16 A 250 V AC, for connection of class II equipment
These plugs are the CEE-7/17 unearthed type, compatible with CEE 7/1 (unearthed), CEE 7/3 (Schuko), and CEE 7/5 (French style) sockets. Corresponding unearthed sockets are also defined, which include features to prevent the insertion of earthed CEE 7/4, 7/6 and 7/7 plugs. South Africa resolves the problem with Schuko's unreliable earthing by forbidding its use on devices which require earthing. This standard was first codified in South Africa by the SABS in 2006.

The last two categories allow many European electrical devices to be imported directly.

== Images ==
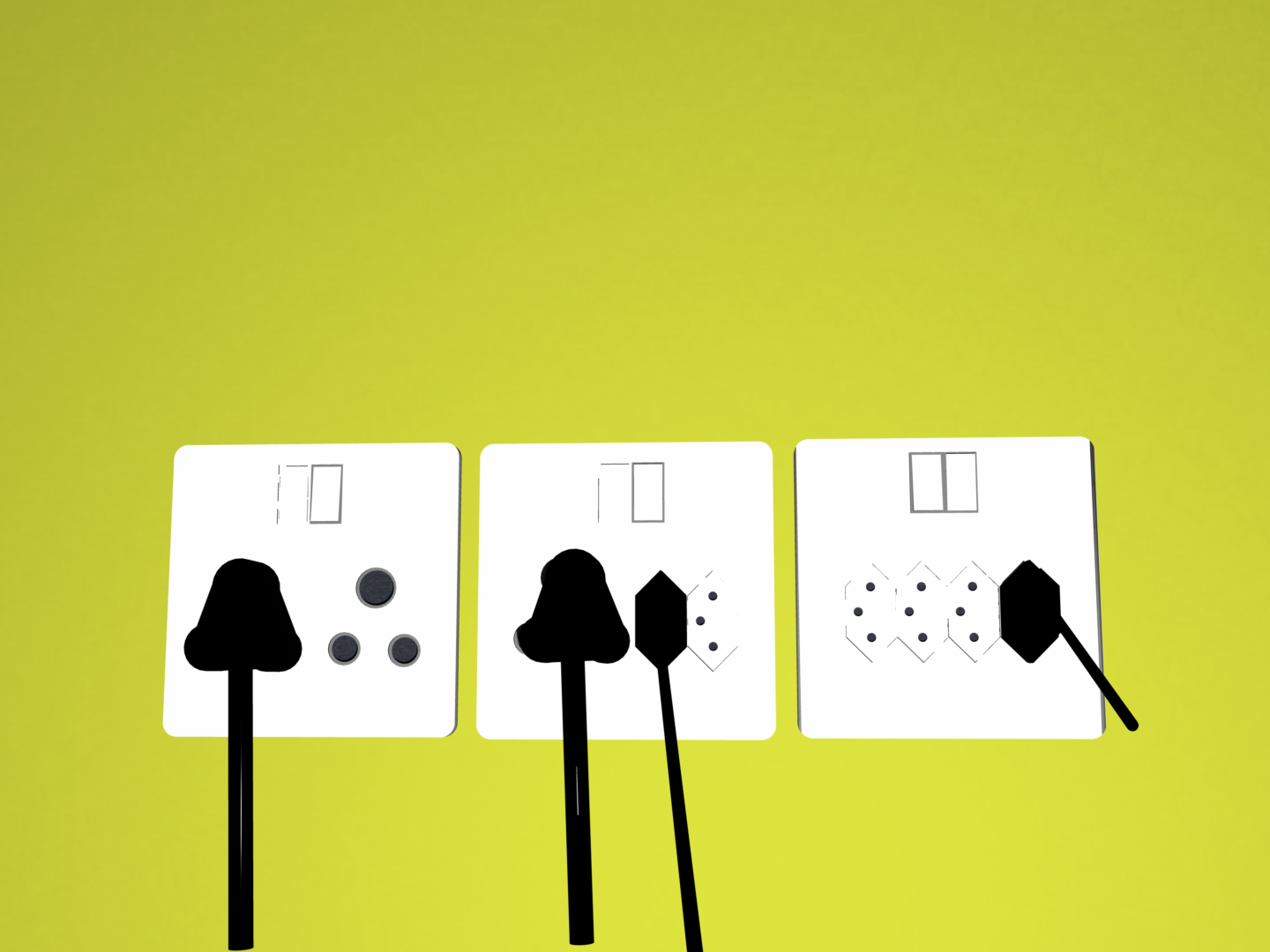
Three different South African wall plates, showing different combinations of the old SANS 164-1 (BS546) and new SANS 164-2 (IEC 60906-1) sockets

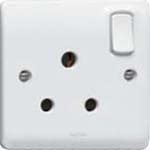
SANS 164-1 16 A (BS546 15 A) wall socket

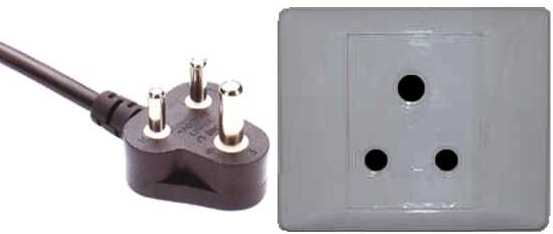
SANS 164-1 16 A (BS546 15 A) plug and socket

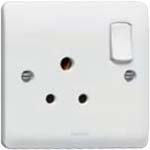
SANS 164-3 6 A (BS546 5 A) wall socket

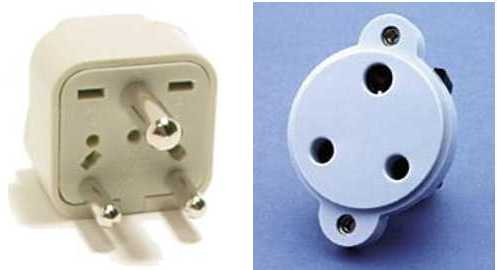
SANS 164-3 6 A (BS546 5 A) plug and socket

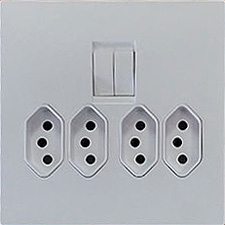
SANS 164-2 (IEC 60906-1) quadruple socket
