= Construction Products Directive =

Repealed EU directive

- Title: Construction Product Directive
- Made by: European Council
- Made under: Article 130s
- Journal reference: L 040, 11 February 1989, p.12-26

History
- Date made: 21 December 1988

Construction Products Directive (Council Directive 89/106/EEC) (CPD) is a now repealed European Union Directive which aimed to remove technical barriers to trade in construction products between Member States in the European Union.

The directive is now replaced by Regulation (EU) No 305/2011. The directive was replaced in order to simplify and clarify the existing framework, and improve the transparency and the effectiveness of the existing measures.

It sought to "ensure the free movement of all construction products within the European Union by harmonizing national laws with respect to the essential requirements applicable to these products in terms of health and safety." An additional objective of the directive was to "standardize the manufacturing of construction products and guarantee the unlimited use of these products within the EU."

The CPD provided the following four main elements:

- a system of harmonised technical specifications
- an agreed system of attestation of conformity for each product family
- a framework of notified bodies
- the CE marking of products.

The Directive did not aim to harmonise regulations. Member States and public and private sector procurers were free to set their own requirements on the performance of works and therefore products. What the CPD sought to harmonise was the methods of test, the methods of declaration of product performance values, and the method of conformity assessment. Choice of value for intended use was left to the regulators in each Member State.

The CPD has been amended by the Council Directive 93/68/EEC of 22 July 1993 and Regulation (EC) No 1882/2003 of the European Parliament and of the Council of 29 September 2003. The directive was repealed and replaced by Regulation (EU) No 305/2011 on 9 March 2011.

== Background ==
The construction sector has one of the most significant economic activities of the EU. Prior to the CPDs inception, there were differing standards and technical approvals among EU member states.

The importance of the CPD was to remove the technical barriers to trade, market barriers and market entry strategy for the EU construction industry. Five hundred product standards and 200 testing standards are planned in the context of the CPD.

The objective of the CPD (and the CPR alike) is not to define the safety of construction products, but to ensure that reliable information is presented in relation to their performance. This is achieved by providing, mainly in standards, a common technical language, to be used not only by manufacturers, but also by public authorities when defining their requirements on construction works, directly or indirectly influencing the demands placed on the products to be used in them.

== Construction Products ==
A 'construction product' means "any product which is produced for incorporation in a permanent manner in construction works, including both buildings and civil engineering works," such as buildings, bridges, highways and other civil engineering projects.

== Harmonized Technical Specifications ==
The Construction Products Directive recognises the following types of Harmonized Technical Specifications:

- Harmonized European Standards
- European Technical Approvals
- European Technical Approvals without Guideline

So far 552 standards have been harmonised.

== CE Marking of construction products ==
CE Marking of construction products was introduced in the CPD in 1989. CE Marking is a declaration by the manufacturer that the product meets certain public safety requirements. The public safety requirements are a set of essential characteristics that each product must satisfy and these characteristics are given in the product's harmonised standard.

There are six essential requirements which need to be addressed (by committee) and satisfied, when relevant, by the product prior to being put on the market:

- Mechanical resistance and stability
- Safety in the case of fire
- Hygiene, health and the environment
- Safety in use
- Protection against noise
- Energy economy and heat retention

CE marking is obligatory for every product placed on the EEA (European Economical area or the European Union + Norway, Iceland and Liechtenstein) market as soon as all conditions are fulfilled to enable this.

== See also ==
- Regulation (EU) No 305/2011
- Quick run through of CE Marking CPR in the UK
