= EOTA =

EOTA can refer to:

- European Organisation for Technical Approvals
- Ford Consul EOTA, a variant of the Ford Consul produced from 1951 to 1956
- Ēota land, the Old English name for Jutland
