= BS 546 =

Class of British AC power plugs and sockets

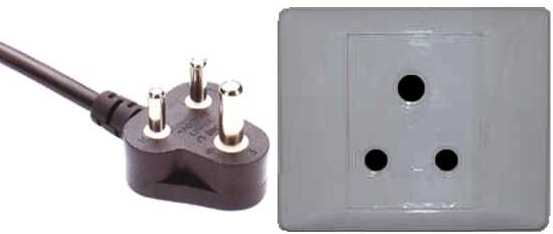
A Type M (BS 546 15 A) plug and socket

BS 546 is a current British Standard for AC power plugs and sockets rated for voltages up to 250 V and currents up to 30 A, valid for domestic appliances. It consists of a family of four sizes of socket-outlet of which the more common 5 A and 15 A rated variants are defined by the IEC as the Type D and Type M respectively. The type D of the BS 546 family is making a resurgence being extensively used for switched lighting circuits.

The plugs have three round pins arranged in a triangle, with the larger top pin being the circuit protective conductor (CPC) pin. The BS 546 socket-outlet system is valid for any correctly sized circuit except on BS 433.1.204 ring final circuits. It predates the universal "Type G" BS 1363, which has taken preference, relegating the BS 546 to niche applications. The current Indian (IS 1293) and South African (SANS 164) socket-outlet standards are based on the BS 546.

== Description ==
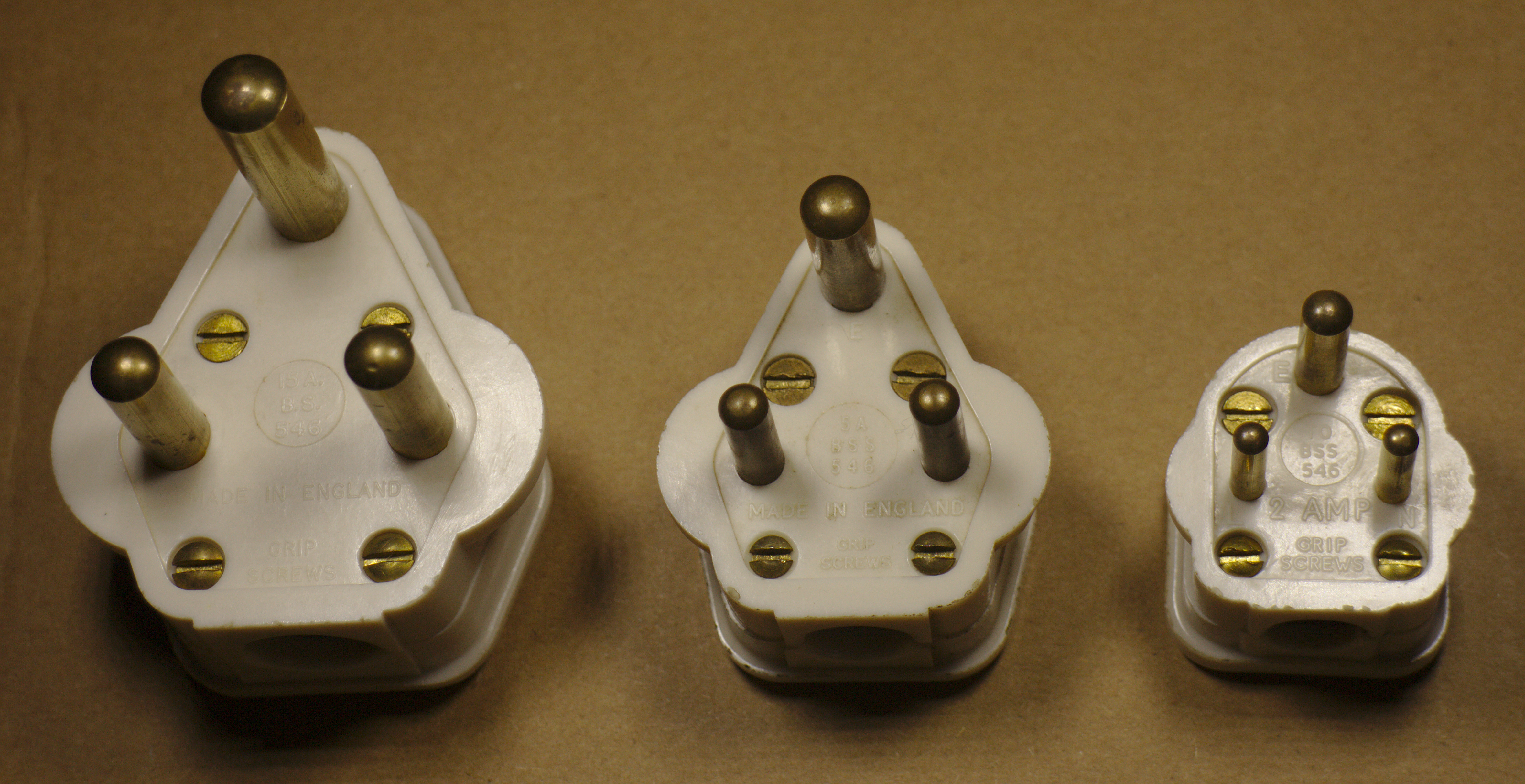
BS 546 plugs. Left to right: 15 A, 5 A and 2 A.

There are four electrical current ratings of plug and socket in BS 546: 2 A; 5 A; 15 A; 30 A. Each has the same general appearance but they are different physical sizes to prevent interchangeability. They also have pin spacing which is different from the two-pin plugs specified in the older BS 372 (see AC power plugs and sockets: British and related types), so earthed plugs will not fit into unearthed sockets, and vice versa. Plugs fitted with BS 546 fuses have been optional since the original BS 546:1934 with maximum fuse ratings of 2 A in the 2 A plug, and 5 A in the 5 A, 15 A and 30 A plugs. In practice most BS 546 plugs are unfused with fused versions being unusual and expensive. The plugs are polarized and are non-interchangeable between current ratings.

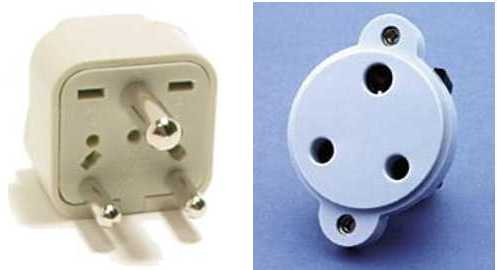
D plug

The 15 ampere (A) sockets were generally given a dedicated 15 A circuit. Multiple 5 A sockets might be on a 15 A circuit, or each on a dedicated 5 A circuit. Lighting circuits fused at 5 A were generally used to feed the 2 A sockets. Adaptors were available from 15 A down to 5 A and from 5 A down to 2 A so in practice it was possible for an appliance with the smallest size of flex to be protected only by a 15 A fuse. This is a similar level of protection to that seen for portable appliances in other countries, but less than the protection offered by the BS 1363 fused plug.

The larger top pin is the earth connection, the left-hand pin is neutral and the right-hand pin is line when looking at a socket or at the rear of a plug.

== Types ==
=== 2-ampere ===
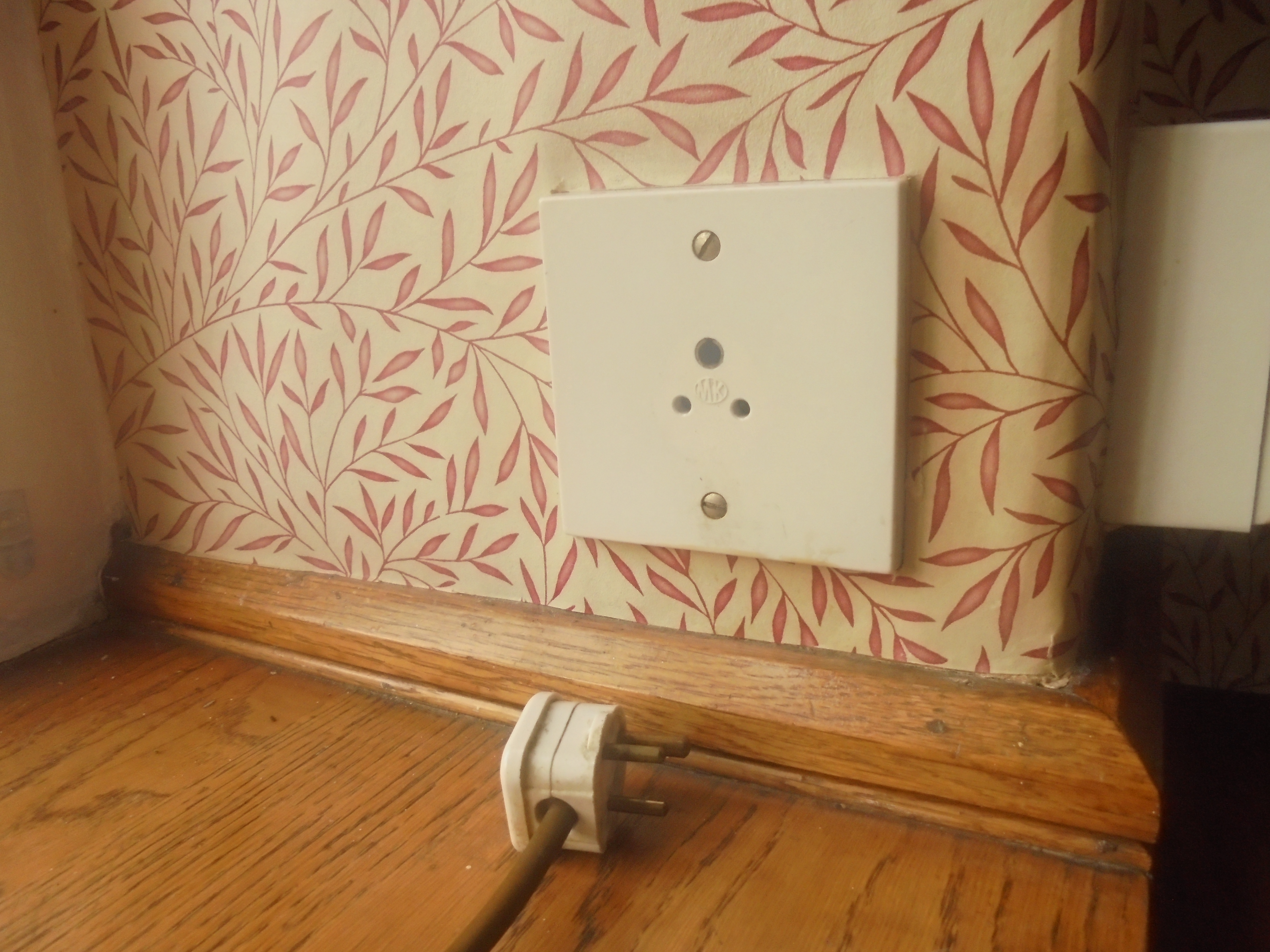
A 2 A BS 546 plug and socket used for a window lamp in England

This plug was used to connect low-power appliances (and to adaptors from the larger socket types). For example, it is used to connect lamps to a lighting circuit.

=== 5-ampere ===
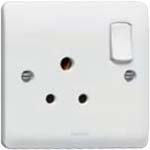
5 A switched socket-outlet

This plug corresponds to Type D in the IEC table. In the UK it was used for moderate sized appliances, either on its own dedicated 5 A circuit or on a multi socket 15 A circuit, and also on many adaptors (both multi socket 5 A adaptors and adaptors that also had 15 A pins). This 5 A plug, along with its 2 A cousin, is typically used in the UK for centrally switched domestic lighting circuits, in order to distinguish them from normal power circuits; this is quite common in hotel rooms. This plug was also once used in theatrical installations for the same reasons as the 15 A model below.

This Type D is the primary plug and socket system used today in Namibia as well as India, Nepal and Bhutan under the Indian IS 1293 standard where it is upgraded to 6 A. In numerous other countries such as Pakistan, this socket is found alongside other plug types. In Sri Lanka it is found in older buildings that have not been updated to Type G.

A 5-amp variant with two contacts is often used in Great Britain for electric shavers, but is usually only fused at 1 amp. A Europlug will also fit this type of plug.

=== 15-ampere ===
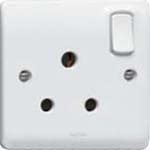
15 A switched socket-outlet

This plug corresponds to Type M in the IEC table. It is used in South Africa as well as Lesotho and Eswatini under the SANS 164 standard, and less commonly in neighbouring Namibia and Mozambique. However, it is gradually being replaced in South Africa by the international standard IEC 60906-1.

In some countries such as Singapore, this plug is often used for energy-intensive appliances such as air conditioners and washing machines, providing a higher current than other outlets (Type G in Singapore's case).

In Great Britain it remains commonly used for indoor dimmable theatre and architectural lighting installations.

=== 30-ampere ===
The 30 A plug is the largest of the family. This was used for high power industrial equipment up to 7.2 kW, such as industrial kitchen appliances, or dimmer racks for stage lighting. Plugs and sockets were usually of an industrial waterproof design with a screw locking ring on the plug to hold it in the socket against waterproof seals, and sockets often had a screw cap chained to them to be used when no plug was inserted to keep them waterproof. Use of the BS 546 30 A plugs and sockets diminished through the 1970s as they were replaced with BS 4343 (which later became IEC 60309) industrial combo plugs and sockets.

== History ==
Originally published in April 1934, it was updated by a 1950 edition which is still current, with eight amendments up to 1999. The 5 A version has been designated as Type D and the 15 A as Type M in the IEC 60083 plugs and sockets standard. The standard replaced a previous one called BS 317.

BS 546 was replaced by BS 1363 (i.e. the Type G socket) from 1947 but remained commonplace in Britain into the 1960s. In the United Kingdom and in Ireland this system is usually referred to by its pin shape, simply being known as "round pin plugs" or "round pin sockets". It is often associated with obsolete wiring installations – or where it is found in modern wiring, it is confined to special use cases, particularly switch-controlled lamps and stage lighting. However BS 546 plugs and sockets are still permitted in the UK, provided the socket has shutters. Some commentators have also mentioned its stated benefits over the newer standard for lighting circuits and smart lighting.

Countries that currently use (whether primarily or rarely) Type D (5 A BS 546) sockets

Countries that currently use (whether primarily or rarely) Type M (15 A BS 546) sockets

== Derived standards ==
The Type D plug is manufactured in incompatible sizes for 2 or 5 amps; the 5-amp plug is the most common. This plug is called "5-A 3-pin" in the British BS 546 standard. The Type M is designated as 15-A 3-pin in the old British standard BS 546.

Russian standard GOST 7396 (Group B1) (2 A, 5 A, and 15 A) also includes it.

=== Indian IS 1293 ===
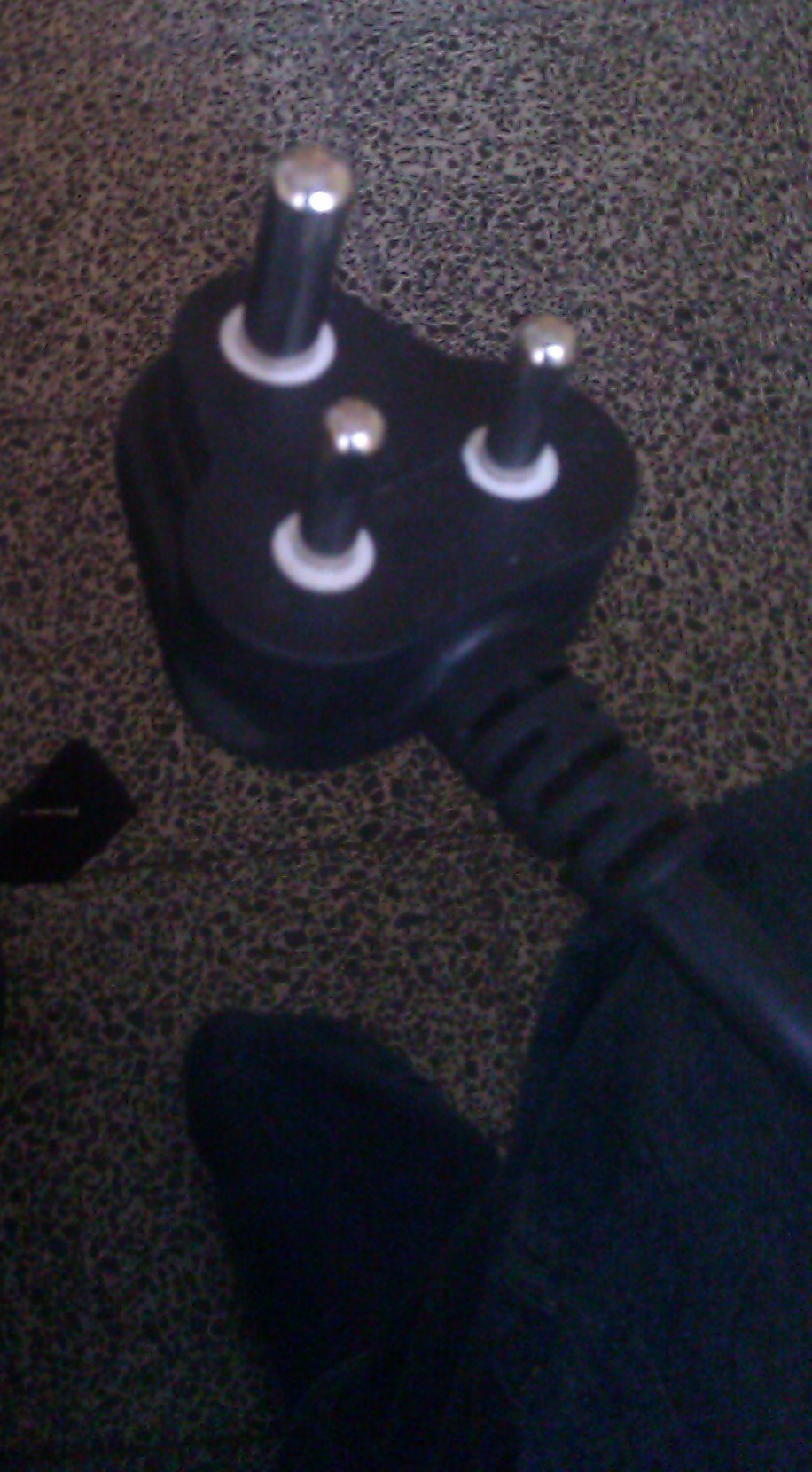
16-amperage IS 1293 plug based on BS 546 in India

Indian standard IS 1293 (also known as IA16A3) Plugs and Socket-Outlets of Rated Voltage up to and including 250 Volts and Rated Current up to and including 16 Amperes includes versions of the 5 A and 15 A BS 546 connectors, but they are rated at 6 A and 16 A respectively. Some 6 A 3 pin sockets also have two extra holes above the line and neutral holes to allow a 5 A 2-pin plug to be connected.

Previously, India used a standard named IS 4615 (1968 revision) which corresponds with the 1950 revision of British standard BS 546.

Both connectors (Type D and Type M) are common in India but as with other countries in the region, there also appear other sockets: in India there are also 2-prong European sockets. From August 2015, the Bureau of Indian Standards (BIS) began clamping down on the sale of imported products with Type C/E/F plugs by pushing manufacturers and importers to comply with the IS 1293 standard partly because of safety. In June 2022, BIS began enforcing the standard through mandatory certification of both imported and domestic products.

==== Development ====
- IS 1293:1988
- IS 1293:2005
- IS 1293:2019

=== South African SANS 164 ===
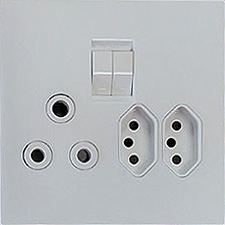
SANS 164-1 socket (left) based on BS 546 in South Africa

The South African standard SANS 164 Plug and socket-outlet systems for household and similar purposes for use in South Africa defines a number of derivatives of BS 546. A household plug and socket is defined in SANS 164-1, and is essentially a modernised version of the BS 546 15 A (the essential differences are that pins can be hollowed to reduce the amount of metal used, the dimensions are metricated, and it is rated 16 A). SANS 164-3 defines a 6 A plug and socket based on the BS 546 5 A. The South African Wiring Code now defines the plug and socket system defined in SANS 164-2 (IEC 60906-1) as the preferred standard, and it is expected that SANS 164-1 and SANS 164-3 devices will be phased out by around 2035.

SANS 164-4 defines three variants of the 16 A plug and socket intended for specialist (known as "dedicated") applications. The variants use a flattened earth pin, each at a different specified rotational position. This arrangement ensures that the dedicated plugs can all plug into an ordinary ("non-dedicated") socket, but that the various dedicated plug and socket combinations are not interchangeable (nor can a non-dedicated plug be inserted into a dedicated socket).

The dedicated versions have specific colours assigned to them, depending on the rotational position of the flattened portion. These are black (−53°), red (0°), and blue (+53°). The red (0°) version is by far the most common, and is widely used on computer and telecommunication equipment (although this is not required in the standard). In this application the "dedicated" socket refers to one that is not connected to a residual current circuit breaker, which is otherwise mandated for all normal power sockets.

=== Malaysian and Singaporean ===
The BS 546 connecters are also described by Malaysian standard MS 1577 (MS 1577:2003 15 A plugs and socket-outlets for domestic and similar purposes) and Singaporean standard SS 472 (SS 472:1999 15 A plugs and switched socket-outlets for domestic and similar purposes) which is also used in the Indonesian Riau Islands. They are used in some places for high-power 15 A appliances.

== Compatibility ==
A Type D socket (BS 546 5 A) has unintended compatibility with Europlugs (Type C), but do not always make proper contact due to the Europlug's longer pins which can cause it to spark. On the other hand type E and F (Schuko) plugs are dangerous to use as these have no flexible prongs (i.e. it has to be forced in) and there will be no grounding connection in the Type D socket.

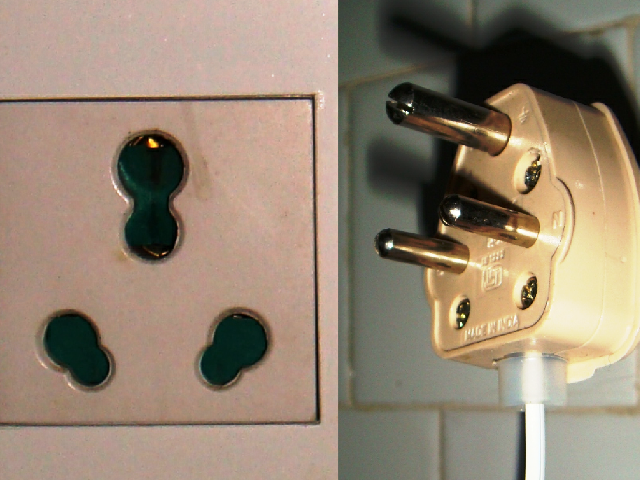
A multi-standard socket accepting both Type D and M plugs

In Type M the distance between the neutral and live pins is not 3/4" (19 mm), but 1" (25.4 mm). The earth pin is offset from these two by 1 1/8" (28.6 mm). Therefore, an adapter is absolutely necessary for Europlugs or other plug types.

A Type D plug does not fit in a Type M socket because of the significantly larger pins on the latter.

All BS 546 plugs are incompatible with other sockets, including the Type G BS 1363.

== Dimensions ==
BS 546:1950 (current version) specifies pin dimensions only in decimal fractions of an inch, as shown below. The metric values are conversions provided here for convenience. Note, the original lengths of the line and neutral pins on the 15 and 5 amp versions were slightly longer at 0.812 inches (20.6 mm) and 0.625 inches (15.9 mm) respectively.

Current rating	2 A	5 A	15 A	30 A
Diameter, line and neutral pins	0.140 inches 3.6 millimetres	0.200 inches 5.1 millimetres	0.278 inches 7.1 millimetres	0.312 inches 7.9 millimetres
Length, line and neutral pins	0.500 inches 12.7 millimetres	0.585 inches 14.9 millimetres	0.733 inches 18.6 millimetres	1.125 inches 28.6 millimetres
Diameter, earth pin	0.200 inches 5.1 millimetres	0.278 inches 7.1 millimetres	0.343 inches 8.7 millimetres	0.375 inches 9.5 millimetres
Length, earth pin	0.625 inches 15.9 millimetres	0.812 inches 20.6 millimetres	1.125 inches 28.6 millimetres	1.437 inches 36.5 millimetres
Distance, L and N pin centres	0.570 inches 14.5 millimetres	0.750 inches 19.1 millimetres	1.000 inch 25.4 millimetres	1.437 inches 36.5 millimetres
Distance, perpendicular, E pin centre and axis of L and N pin centres	0.570 inches 14.5 millimetres	0.875 inches 22.2 millimetres	1.125 inches 28.6 millimetres	1.562 inches 39.7 millimetres

== See also ==
- AC power plugs and sockets: British and related types
- BS 1363
- DS 107-2-D1 (Danish)
