= National Standards Authority of Ireland =

Irish national standards organisation

- Abbreviation: NSAI
- Formation: 1999
- Type: Standards testing and accreditation
- Region served: Ireland
- Website: www.nsai.ie

The National Standards Authority of Ireland (NSAI) is the International Organization for Standardization (ISO) member body for Ireland. The NSAI is also a member of the European Organisation for Technical Approvals.

The NSAI was established by the National Standards Authority of Ireland Act, 1996. In 1946 standards functions were the responsibility of Institute for Industrial Research and Standards, in 1988 they passed to Eolas — The Irish Science and Technology Agency, and in 1994 passed to Forfás before passing to the NSAI.

As Ireland's official standards body, the NSAI aims to inspire consumer confidence and protect industry interests through setting standards and issuing certification in the quality and safety of goods and services. The NSAI benchmarks these standards against international best practice and is therefore a key facilitator of fair trade both in Ireland and in global markets.

The NSAI provides knowledge-based services and technical support to the Irish Government, consumers and industry, through:

- Consultation on standards to assist manufacturers and suppliers in meeting safety and consumer requirements;
- Independent certification of products, processes and services;
- Certification specific to the construction industry, known as ‘agrément’;
- Regulatory control in the area of measures, or metrology;
- Maintenance and development of the national measurement standards.

As well as domestic activities, the NSAI also represents Ireland in European and international standards bodies, whose aim is to harmonise standards and remove technical barriers to trade.
