= New Legislative Framework =

European Union legislation process

The New Legislative Framework is a framework to design legislation which aims to improve the functioning of the internal market of the European Union. Adopted in 2008, it "aims to improve the internal market for goods and strengthen the conditions for placing a wide range of products on the EU market". The framework aims to "[improve] market surveillance rules, [set] clear and transparent rules for the accreditation of conformity assessment bodies, [boost] the quality of and confidence in the conformity assessment of products", clarify the meaning of CE marking, and "[establish] a common legal framework for industrial products".

The framework was enacted as a package of two laws in 2008, which were later amended by Regulation (EU) 2019/1020.

== Background ==
The "new" framework is the successor to two previous frameworks:

- the New Approach (Council Resolution of 7 May 1985), and
- the Global Approach (Council Resolution of 21 December 1989).

A European Council resolution adopted in November 2003 noted "the importance of the New and Global approach as an appropriate and efficient regulatory model allowing technological innovation and enhancing competitiveness of European industry, as well as supporting the principles of confidence, transparency and competence".

As with its predecessors, the technical specifications of products meeting the essential requirements set out in the directives are laid down in harmonised standards set by European Standards Organizations. Following such standards, which are set by private bodies, gives a presumption of conformity with the legislation. Likewise, the European Commission is assisted by the committee procedure (comitology) in its work under the framework.

== Concern around legitimacy ==
The New Legislative Framework has been criticised for lacking legitimacy. The technique was initially used to accelerate European integration by limiting the involvement of the legislature in technical decision-making, such as around the safety of engineered products. However, scholars have also criticised the expansion of private standards from technical to "quasi-technical" domains, including environmental protection, accessibility and the regulation of artificial intelligence through the EU Artificial Intelligence Act, creating concerns around the legitimacy of delegating rule-making without sufficient public input. While in theory, using private standards to comply with the law is voluntary, the costs of doing so without such standards have led scholars to claim that compliance without them has been called "pure fiction". Furthermore, such standards are behind paywalls, as the business models of the standardising entities involves recouping costs by selling the copyright to users of the standards.

=== Response ===
The European Commission has previously considered replacing private standardisation bodies with a body of the European Union, whose work would be directly subject to the jurisdiction of the Court of Justice of the European Union, but this was not taken forwards. Instead, the Court of Justice has been undertaking what scholars have termed the "juridification" of private standards, which has included allowing them to be subject to preliminary rulings, and, following a case taken by Public.Resource.Org, access to documents requests. This has created further controversy, as it means that individuals can make requests for copies of standards that are otherwise charged for by the national standards bodies that own the copyright to the translations, as well as further tensions, as many of these standards are themselves copies of International Organization for Standardization standards, provided on license.
