= BS 1363 =

Type of British AC power plug and socket

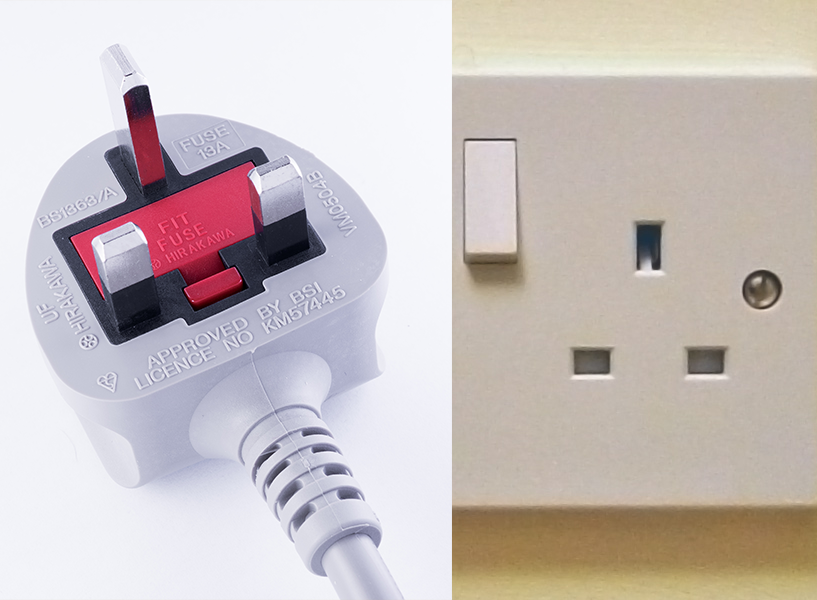
A BS 1363 (Type G) plug and socket-outlet

BS 1363 is a British Standard for AC power plugs and sockets in the United Kingdom, rated for up to 250 V and 13 A. These rectangular 3-pin plugs correspond to Type G according to the IEC. Distinctive characteristics of the system are shutters on the line and neutral socket holes, and a user replaceable fuse in the plug.

The BS 1363 is a one plug solution to the older round-pinned, BS 546 socket-outlet family of four differing non- interchangeable socket-outlet types. The BS 1363 replaced the 2A, 5A and 15A of the four BS 546 socket-outlet types by inserting a fuse of the appropriate amperage rating between 1A and 13A into the plug. It became the dominant socket-outlet in the United Kingdom for most domestic uses also being adopted in many of its current and former overseas territories. The Type G plug and socket is also primarily used in a number of other countries around the world, and BS 1363 is adapted into equivalent standards including national Irish (I.S. 401), Malaysian (MS 589) and Saudi Arabian (SASO 2203) ones. The sockets are not directly compatible with any of the European plugs (CEE 7), nor with the British shaver plug.

== Ratings ==
BS 1363 plugs and sockets are rated for use at a maximum of 250 V AC and 13 A. The exception is non-rewirable plugs which have a current rating according to the type of cable connected to and the fuse fitted. The rating must be marked on the plug, and in the case of non-rewirable plugs the marking must be the value of the fuse fitted by the plug manufacturer in accordance with table 2 of the standard. Typical ratings for non-rewirable plugs are 3 A, 5 A, 10 A and 13 A.

== Plugs ==
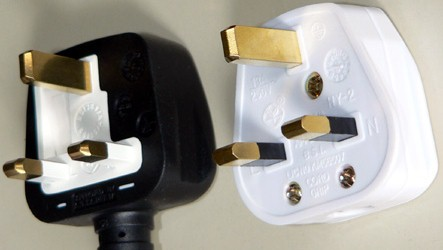
Left: a typical moulded BS 1363 plug, showing the fuse access from the underside of the plug. Right: a typical rewireable plug (before installation); the large central screw releases the cover, allowing access to the terminals and also the fuse; the two smaller screws secure an internal strain relief bar.

These British plugs are described in part 1 of the specification (BS 1363-1 Rewirable and non-rewirable 13 A fused plugs). A BS 1363 plug has two horizontal, rectangular pins for line and neutral, and above these pins, a larger, vertical pin for an earth connection. Both line and neutral carry current and are defined as live parts. The earth pin also serves to operate the basic shutter mechanism used in many sockets. Correct polarity is established by the position of the earth pin relative to the other two pins, ensuring that the line pin is connected to the correct terminal in the socket-outlet.

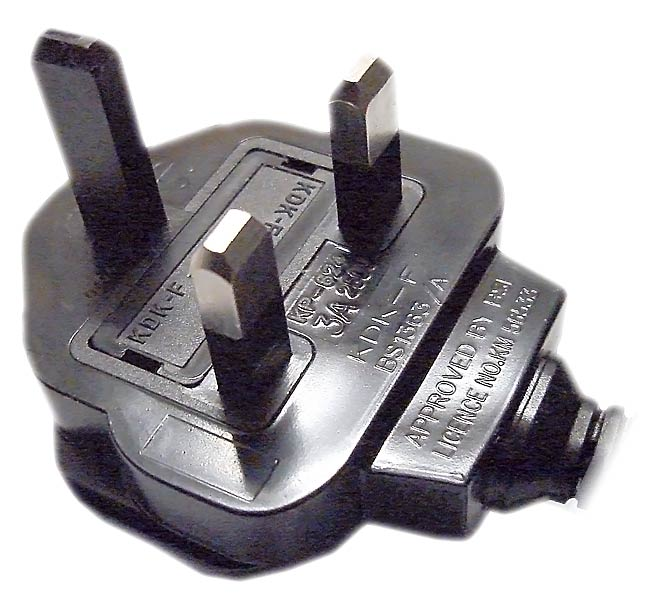
An unearthed BS 1363 plug, with a plastic pin insulated shutter opening device (ISOD) and sleeved live pins.

Moulded plugs for unearthed, double-insulated appliances may instead have a non-conductive plastic pin (an Insulated Shutter Opening Device or ISOD, sometimes called a dummy pin) the same size and shape as an earth pin, to open the shutters. When looking at the plug pins with the earth uppermost the lower left pin is line, and the lower right is neutral.

UK consumer protection legislation requires that most domestic electrical goods sold must be provided with fitted plugs to BS 1363-1. These are usually, but not necessarily, non-rewirable. Rewirable plugs for hand-wiring with a screwdriver are commonly available and must be provided with instructions.

=== Nominal dimensions ===
BS 1363-1 specifies the dimensions of plug pins and their disposition with respect to each other in precise, absolute terms. The line and neutral pins have a rectangular cross section 6.4 mm by 4.0 mm, 17.7 mm long and with centres 22.2 mm apart. The protective-earth pin is a rectangular cross section 8.0 mm by 4.0 mm, 22.3 mm long and with a centre line 22.2 mm from the line/neutral pin centre line. The dimensions were originally specified in decimal inches with asymmetric tolerances and redefined as minimum and maximum metric dimensions in BS 1363:1984.

Dimensions are chosen to provide safe clearance to live parts. The distance from any part of the line and neutral pins to the periphery of the plug base must be not less than 9.5 mm. This ensures that nothing can be inserted alongside a pin when the plug is in use and helps keep fingers away from the pins. The longer earth pin ensures that the earth path is connected before the live pins, and that it remains connected until after the live pins are disconnected. The earth pin is too large to be inserted into the line or neutral sockets by mistake.

=== Pin insulation ===
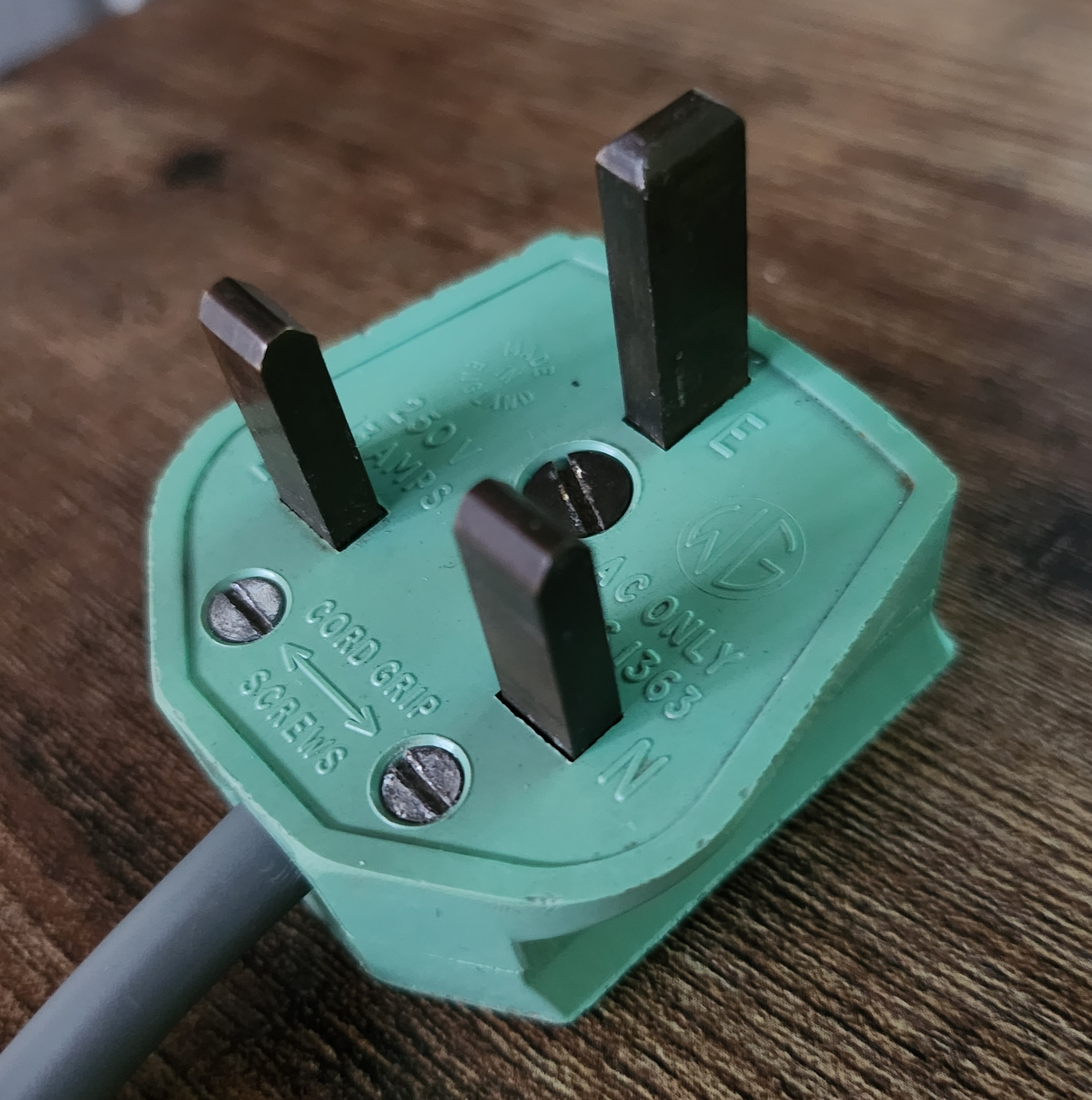
Uninsulated BS 1363 Plug

Initially, BS 1363 did not require the line and neutral pins to have insulating sleeves. Plugs made to the recent revisions of the standard have insulated sleeves to prevent finger contact with pins, and also to stop metal objects (for example, fallen window blind slats) from becoming live if lodged between the wall and a partly pulled out plug. The length of the sleeves prevents any live contacts from being exposed while the plug is being inserted or removed. An early method of sleeving the pins involving spring-loaded sleeves is described in the 1967 British Patent GB1067870. The method actually adopted is described in the 1972 British Patent GB1292991. Plugs with such pins were available in the 1970s; a Southern Electricity/RoSPA safety pamphlet from 1978 encourages their use. Sleeved pins became required by the standard in 1984.

=== Fuses (BS 1362) ===
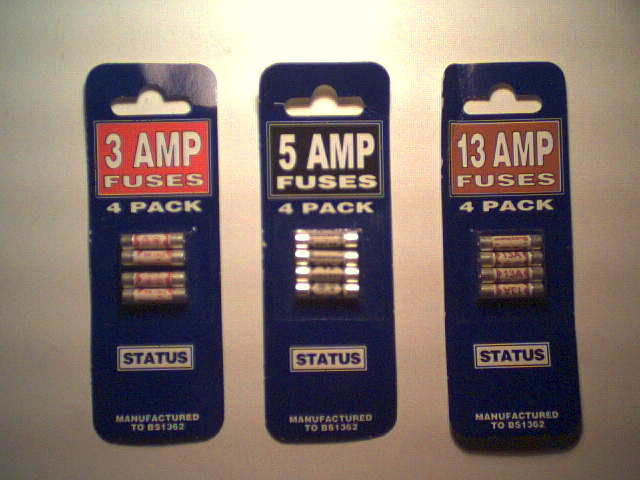
BS 1362 fuses (for BS 1363 plugs)

There are two common misconceptions about the purpose of the fuse in a BS 1363 plug: one is that it protects the appliance connected to the plug, and the other is that it protects against overloading. In fact the fuse is there to protect the flexible cord between the plug and the appliance under fault conditions (typical British ring circuits can deliver more current than appliance flexible power cords can handle).

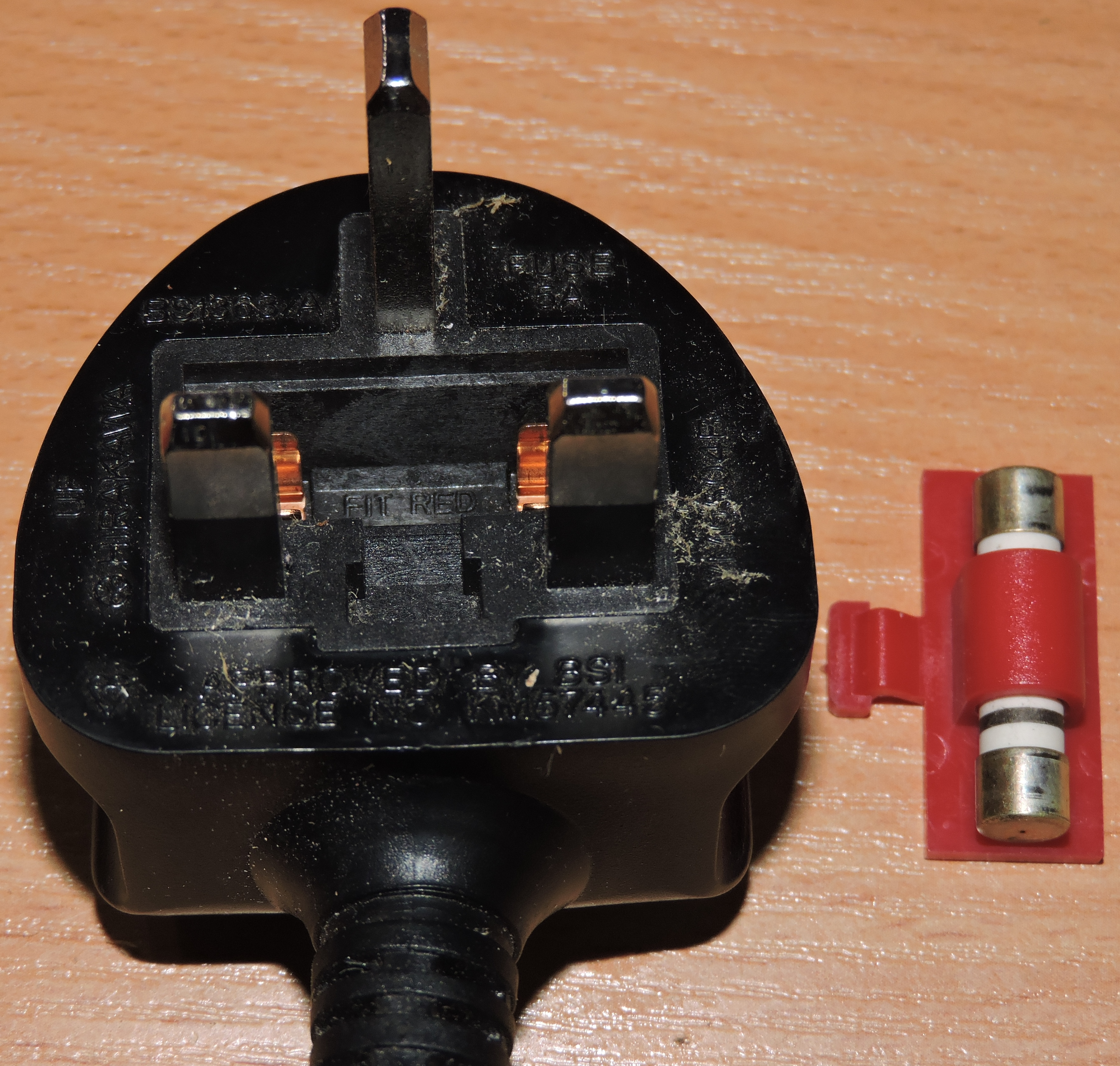
A British plug with a removed fuse cartridge containing a fuse

BS 1363 plugs are required to carry a cartridge fuse, which must conform to BS 1362. Post-War Building Studies No. 11, Electrical Installations included the recommendation that "Provision should be made in the plug for the accommodation of a cartridge type of fuse for 13 amps., and alternatively, for 3 amps. Fuses of these ratings should be interchangeable and be readily identified." The original BS 1363:1947 specified fuse ratings of 3 A, 7 A and 13 A. The current version of the fuse standard, BS 1362:1973, allows any fuse rating up to 13 A, with 3 A (coloured red) and 13 A (coloured brown) as the preferred (but not mandated) values when used in a plug. All other ratings are to be coloured black. Most common in consumer retail outlets are fuses rated 3, 5 and 13 A; Professional suppliers also commonly stock fuses rated 1, 2, 7, and 10 A.

Fuses are mechanically interchangeable; it is up to the end-user or appliance manufacturer to install the appropriate rating fuse.It has long been a common practice, although not a good one, for the maximum capacity 13A fuse to be supplied and used by default. More appropriate lower-capacity fuses are now supplied with some plugs instead.

BS 1362 specifies sand-filled ceramic-bodied cylindrical fuses, with dimensions of 1 inch (25 mm) in length, with two metallic end caps of 1/4 inch (6.4 mm) diameter and roughly 1/5 inch (5.1 mm) long. The standard specifies breaking time versus current characteristics only for 3 A or 13 A fuses.

- For 3 A fuses: 0.02–80 s at 9 A, < 0.1 s at 20 A and < 0.03 s at 30 A.
- For 13 A fuses: 1–400 s at 30 A, 0.1–20 s at 50 A and 0.01–0.2 s at 100 A.

==== BS 1363-4 13 A fused connection units switched and unswitched ====
Switched and unswitched fused connection units, without sockets, use BS 1362 fuses for connection of permanently wired appliances to a socket-outlet circuit. They are also used in other situations where a fuse or switch (or both) is required, such as when feeding lighting off a socket-outlet circuit, to protect spurs off a ring circuit with more than one socket-outlet, and sometimes to switch feeds to otherwise concealed sockets for kitchen appliances.

=== Other safety features ===
Internal wiring.: 1. Cable grip; 2. Neutral terminal; 3. Earth terminal; 4. Line terminal; 5. Fuse

The plug sides are shaped to improve grip and make it easier to remove the plug from a socket-outlet. The plug is polarised, so that the fuse is in the line side of the supply. The flexible cord always enters the plug from the bottom, discouraging removal by tugging on the cable, which can damage the cable. Rewireable plugs must be designed so that they can be wired in a manner which prevents strain to the earth connection before the line and neutral connection in the event of failure of the cord anchorage.

=== Counterfeits and non-standard plugs ===
Plugs which do not meet BS 1363 often find their way into the UK. Some of these are legal in the country they are manufactured in, but do not meet BS 1363 – these can be brought into the UK by unsuspecting travellers, or people purchasing electrical goods online. They can also be purchased through many UK electrical component distributors. There are also counterfeit plugs which appear to meet the standards (and are marked as such) but do not in fact comply. Legislation was introduced, with the last revision in 1994, to require plugs sold to meet the technical standard. Counterfeit products are regularly seized when found, to enforce the safety standards and to protect the approval marks and trademarks of imitated manufacturers. The pressure group PlugSafe reported in March 2014 that since August 2011 "thousands" of listings of products including illegal plugs had been removed from the UK sections of the websites eBay and Amazon Marketplace. The UK Electrical Safety Council expressed shock at the magnitude of the problem and published a video showing a plug exploding due to a counterfeit BS 1362 fuse. The Institution of Engineering and Technology also published information on the extent of the problem with online retailers, many advertising replacement cord sets, mobile device chargers, and travel adaptors fraudulently marked BS 1363, and mentioning the same sites.

Physical compatibility with a Type G socket does not by itself demonstrate that a travel adaptor complies with BS 1363 safety requirements. Pin dimensions, fuse construction and rating, protection against access to live parts, and earthing continuity where required can all affect safety. In 2026, UK product-safety authorities rejected several travel adaptors after finding non-compliant BS 1363 plug dimensions or fuses, with the defects assessed as presenting a serious fire risk.

== Sockets ==
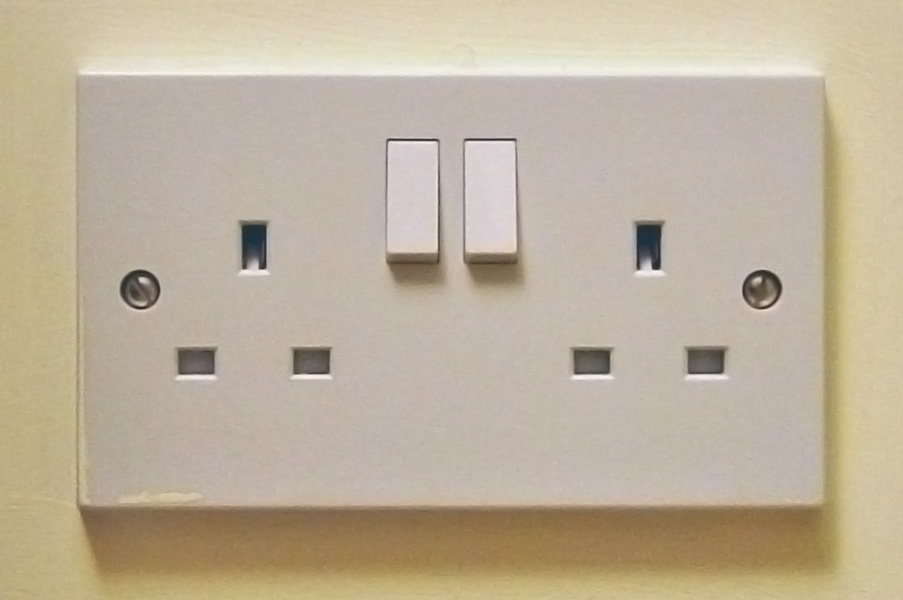
BS 1363 type electrical socket-outlets. The closed shutters block entry of foreign objects

BS 1363 sockets are described in part 2 of the specification (BS 1363-2 13 A switched and unswitched socket-outlets). These sockets are commonly supplied with integral switches as a convenience, but switches are optional and did not form part of BS 1363 until 1967.

Sockets are required to mate correctly with BS 1363 plugs (as opposed to the dimensions of the socket contacts being specified). This is checked by means of the use of various gauges which are specified in the standard; these gauges ensure that the socket contacts are correctly positioned and make effective and secure contact with the plug pins. There is no provision for establishing the interchangeability with any other device having plug pins incorporated, but which is not covered by BS 1363 (for example a charger or socket cover), unless that device conforms precisely to the plug pin dimensions specified. The insertion of non-compliant plugs may damage sockets. The important socket dimensions which the standard does specify are: A minimum insertion of 9.6 mm from the face of the socket-outlet to the first point of contact with a live part, a minimum distance of 9.5 mm from the line and neutral apertures to the periphery of the socket face, and not to exceed dimensions for the apertures of 7.2 mm × 4.8 mm (line and neutral) and 8.8 mm × 4.8 mm (earth).

When looking at the front of the socket with the earth aperture uppermost (as normally mounted) the lower left aperture is for the neutral contact, and the lower right is for the line contact.

=== Shutters ===
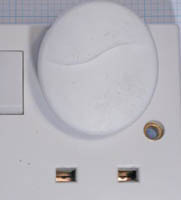
Demonstration: an inverted socket cover inserted into earth hole only, opening safety shutters, and thus exposing the live contacts

BS 1363 sockets must have shutters on the line and neutral contacts to prevent the insertion of a foreign object into the socket. Many sockets use the original method of shutters opened by the earth pin (or plastic ISOD), longer than the other pins and hence opening the shutters before the other pins engage, alone. Alternatively, shutters may be opened by simultaneous insertion of line and neutral pins. Some later designs require all three pins to be inserted simultaneously. The use of automatic shutters for protection dates back to at least 1927. Other countries, for example the USA, are gradually requiring their sockets to be protected by shutters.

There is a specific requirement in the standard to ensure that Europlugs and other two-pin plugs may not be used with BS 1363 sockets "It shall not be possible to operate a shutter by inserting a 2-pin plug into a 3-pin socket-outlet." However, many extension sockets will allow a plug to be inserted upside down, i.e. only the earth pin, defeating the shutter mechanism. This method is sometimes used to allow a Europlug (with two small round pins and no earth pin) to be forced into the open line and neutral ports. The UK Electrical Safety Council has drawn attention to the fire risk associated with forcing Europlugs into BS 1363 sockets.

=== Socket covers ===
In countries using un-shuttered socket-outlets, socket covers are sometimes sold to prevent children inserting objects into otherwise unprotected sockets. Such covers are also sometimes sold in the UK, but the shutters of the BS 1363 socket-outlet make these unnecessary. There has been publicity about the dangers of poor quality covers, most of which open the shutters when plugged in, but some of which then break apart on removal in a way that leaves the shutters open and the contact holes exposed, or some with poorly formed pins that can strain the contact springs and damage the socket. A 2012 article in the Institution of Engineering and Technology journal Wiring Matters concludes that "Socket protectors are not regulated for safety, therefore, using a non-standard system to protect a long established safe system is not sensible." In 2016 the use of socket covers was banned in premises controlled by the National Health Service (NHS) in the United Kingdom. BEAMA (British Electrotechnical and Allied Manufacturers Association) published the following statement in June 2017: "BEAMA strongly advises against the use of socket-outlet 'protective' covers."

== Adaptors ==
=== BS 1363-3 Adaptors ===
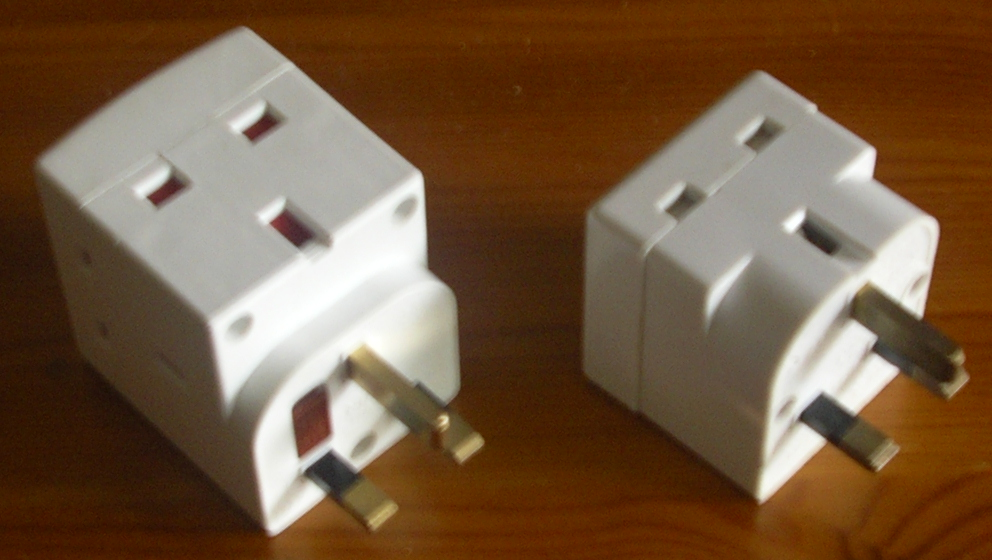
Tripler (left) and doubler (right). The tripler has a red fuse carrier visible.

Plug adaptors permit two or more plugs to share one socket-outlet, or allow the use of a plug of different type. There are several common types, including double- and triple-socket blocks, shaver adaptors, and multi-socket strips. Adaptors which allow the use of non-BS 1363 plugs, or more than two BS 1363 plugs, must be fused. Appliances are designed not to draw more power than their plug is rated for; the use of such adaptors, and also multi-socketed extension leads, makes it possible for several appliances to be connected through a single outlet, with the potential to cause dangerous overloads.

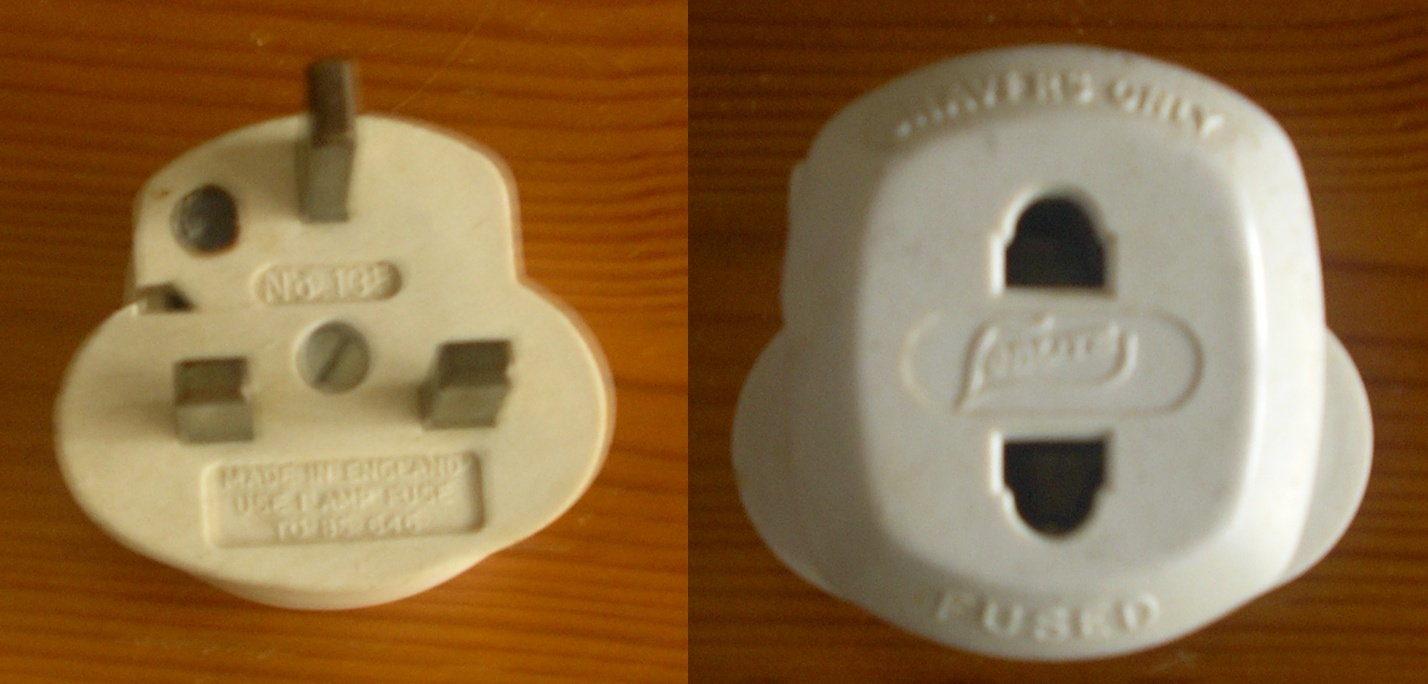
Shaver adaptor

There are also "shaver adaptors" of which the purpose is to accept the two-pin plugs of British shavers; they are required to be marked as such. Shaver adaptors must have a 1 A BS 646 fuse. They must accept British shaver plugs complying with BS 4573 and also Europlugs and American two-pin plugs.

=== BS 1363-5 13 A fused conversion plugs ===
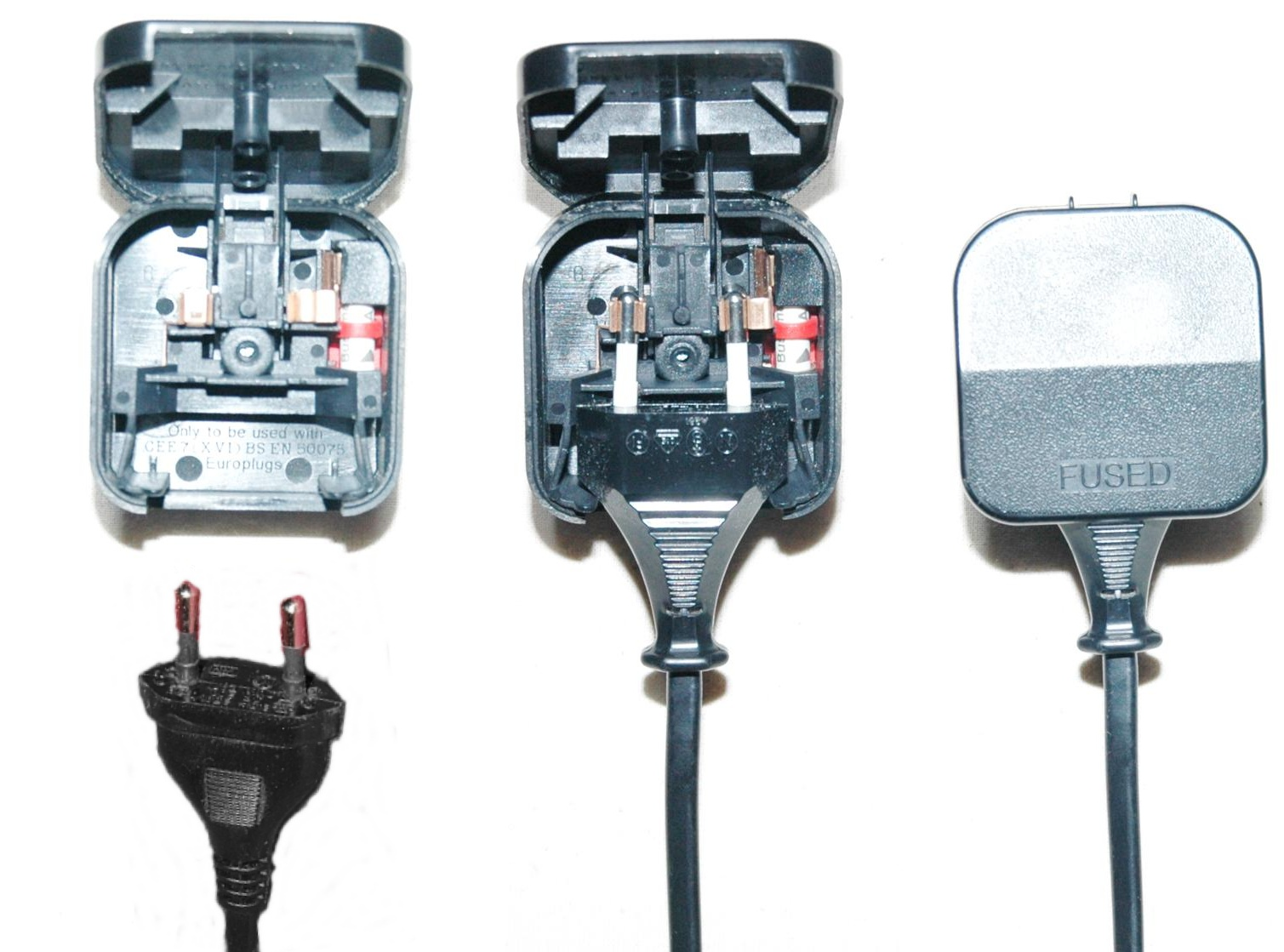
Conversion plug suitable for europlug, empty, europlug inserted and closed

A conversion plug is a special type of plug suitable for the connection of non-BS 1363-type plugs (to a recognized standard) to BS 1363 sockets. An example would be Class II appliances from mainland Europe which are fitted with moulded europlugs. Similar converters are available for a variety of other plug types. Unlike a temporary travel adaptor, conversion plugs, when closed, resemble normal plugs, although larger and squarer. The non-BS 1363 plug is inserted into the contacts, and the hinged body of the conversion plug is closed and fixed shut to grip the plug. There must be an accessible fuse. Conversion plugs may be non-reusable (permanently closed) or reusable, in which case it must be impossible to open the conversion plug without using a tool.

The Plugs and Sockets, etc. (Safety) Regulations 1994 permit domestic appliances fitted with non-BS 1363 plugs to be supplied in the UK with conversion plugs fitted, but not with conversion plugs supplied for fitting by the consumer.

== Variations ==
=== Folding plugs ===
Due to the size of the BS 1363 plug, attempts have been made to develop a compatible folding plug. As of July 2014 two folding plugs have been certified under specially developed ASTA standards: SlimPlug, which complies with ASTA AS153, and ThinPlug, which complies with ASTA AS158. SlimPlug is available only as part of a complete power lead terminating in an IEC 60320 C7 unpolarized (figure-of-eight) connector. In 2009 the ThinPlug received a "Red Dot" award for product design. The first product, also a power lead terminating in an IEC 60320 C7 unpolarized (figure-of-eight) connector, became available in 2011.

Folding plugs

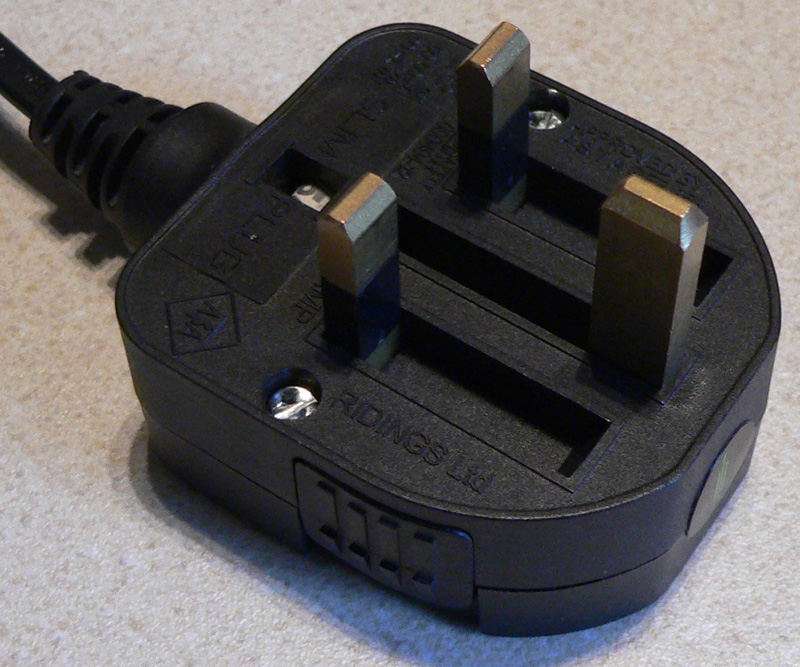
The SlimPlug folding plug

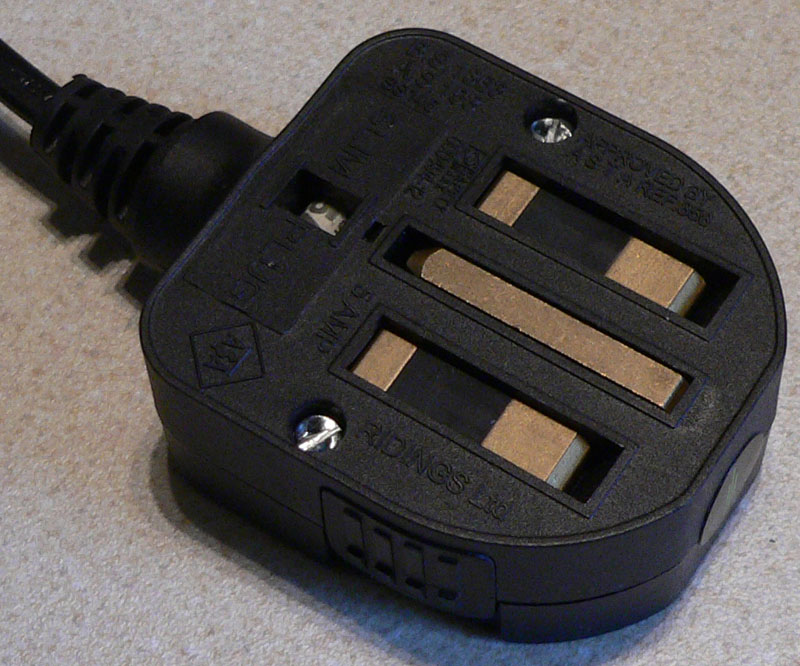
SlimPlug with pins retracted

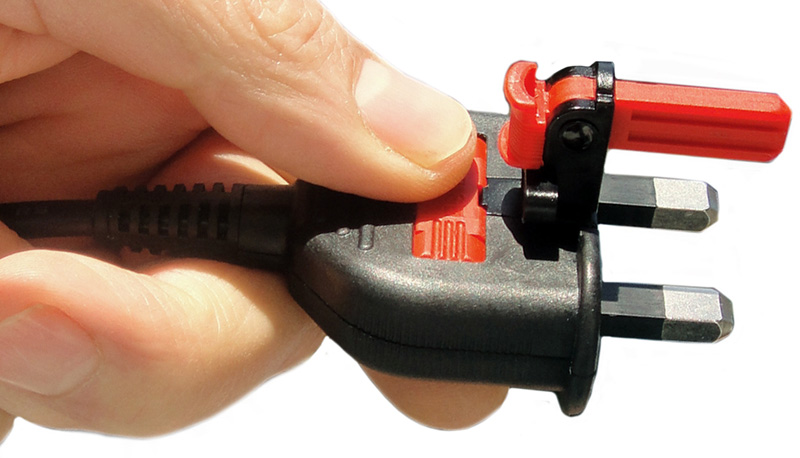
The ThinPlug folding plug

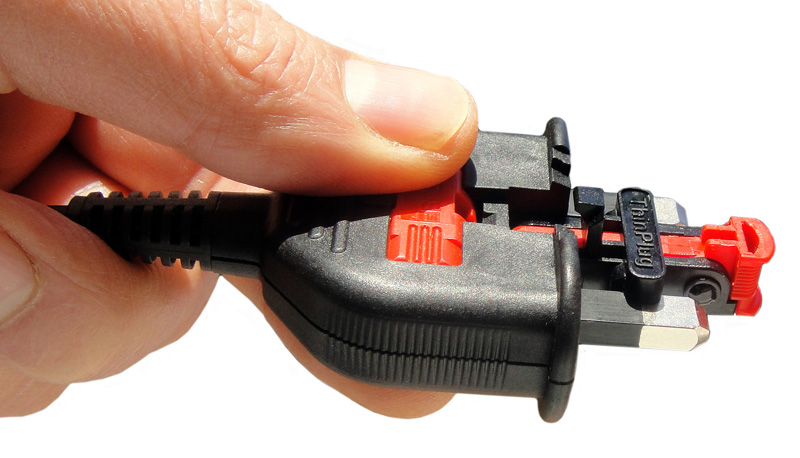
ThinPlug with ISOD folded

=== Variant pin configurations ===
Several manufacturers have made deliberately incompatible variants for use where connection with standard plugs is not acceptable. Common uses include filtered supplies for computer equipment and cleaners' supplies in public buildings and areas (to prevent visitors plugging in unauthorised equipment). Examples are one design made by MK which has a T-shaped earth pin, and the Walsall Gauge 13 A plug, which has each pin rotated 90°, the latter being in use on parts of the London Underground for 110 V AC supply, and also in some British Rail offices for filtered computer supplies.

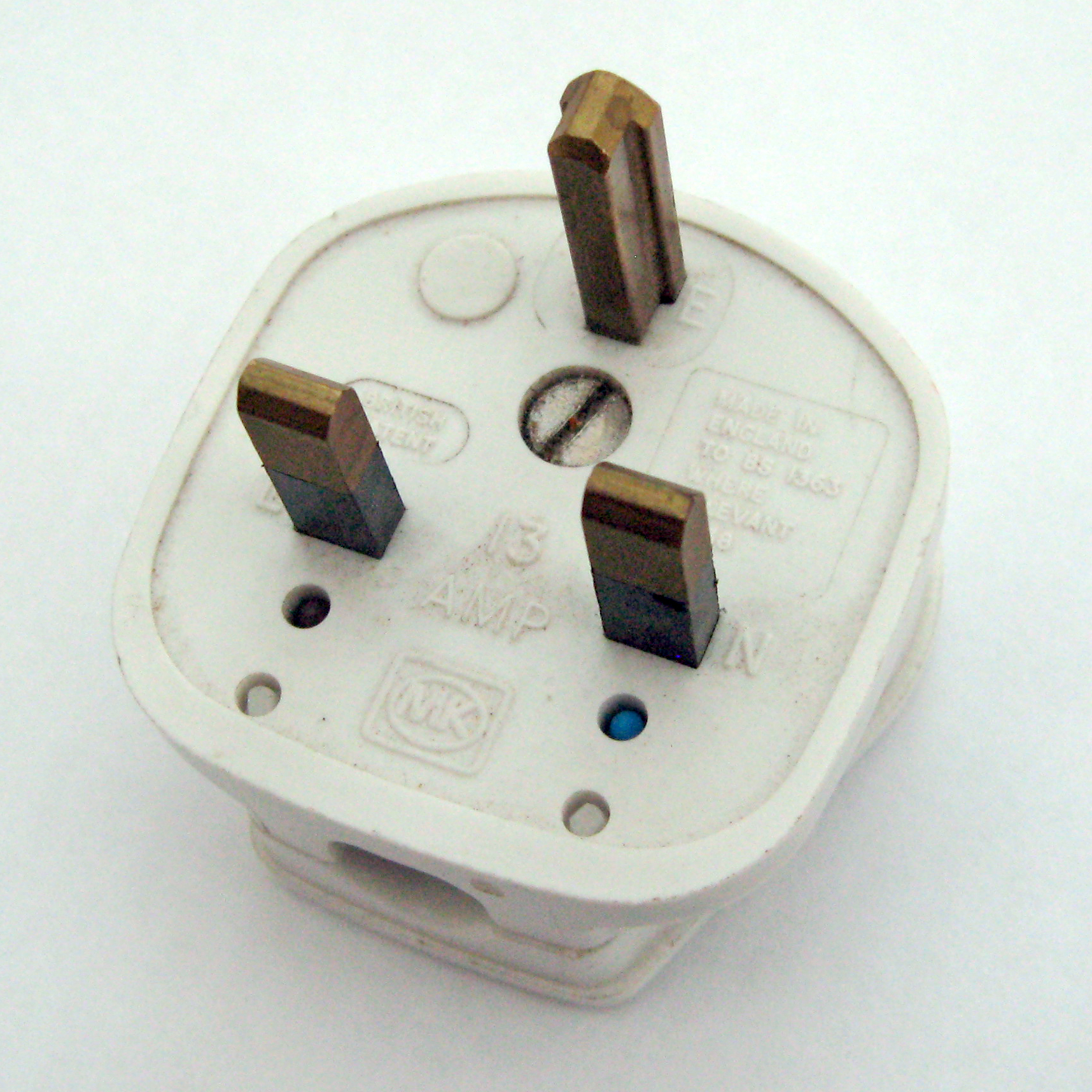
MK 13 A Plug with a T-shaped earth pin

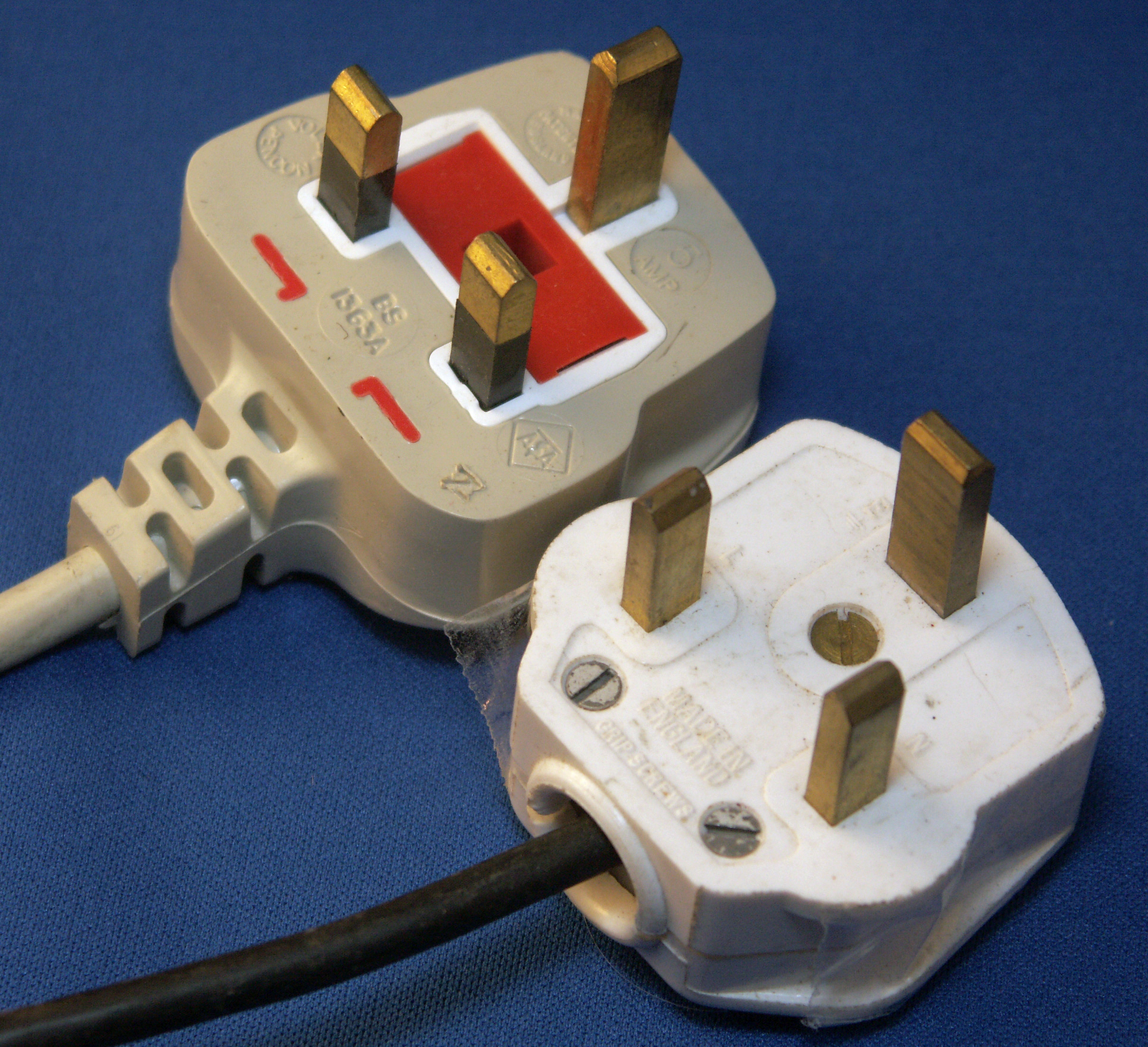
Walsall Gauge 13 A plug (bottom) compared with regular BS 1363 plug

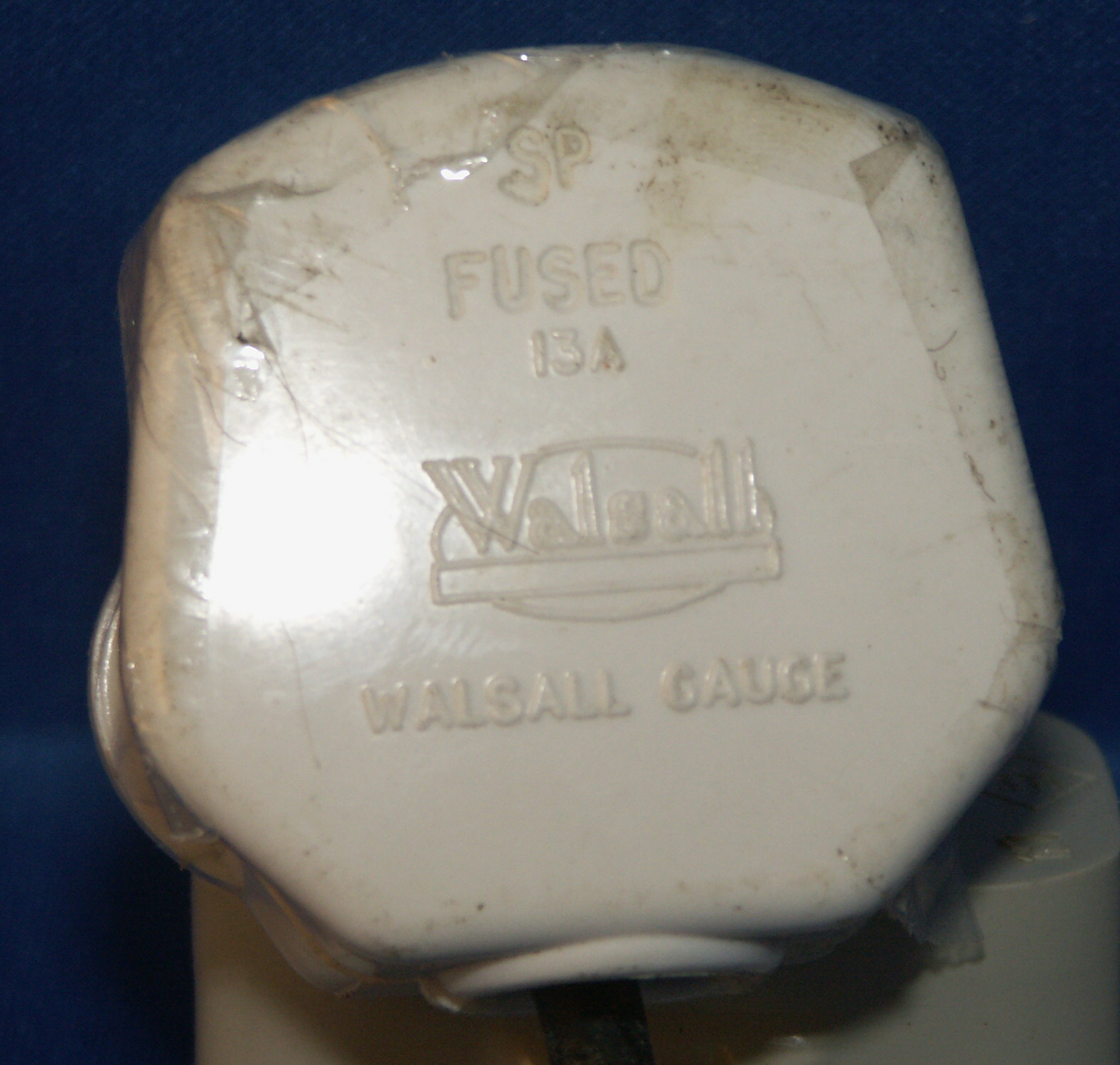
Walsall Gauge 13 A plug

== History ==
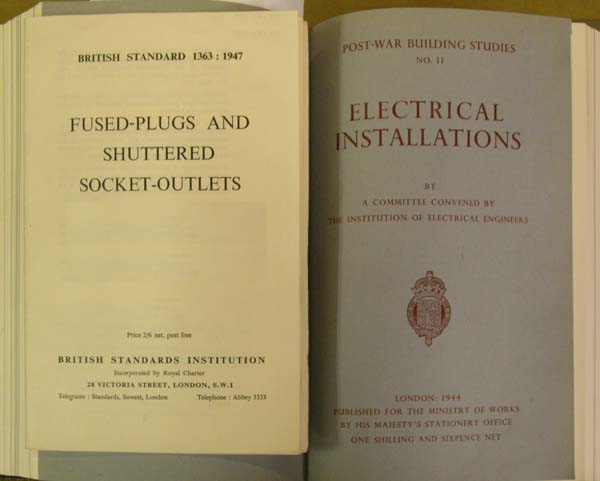
BS 1363:1947 "Fused-Plugs and Shuttered Socket-Outlets" which resulted from the report "Post-War Building Studies No. 11, Electrical Installations"

The plug and socket-outlet system defined in BS 1363 is a result of one of the Post War Building Studies report's recommendations. Britain pre-war had used a combination of 2 A, 5 A, and 15 A round pin sockets (the BS 546). In an appendix to the main report (July 1944), the committee proposed that a completely new socket-outlet with a user replaceable fuse in the plug to protect an appliance's flexible cord should be adopted as the "all-purpose" one socket and plug domestic standard. This requirement for a new system of plugs and sockets led to the publishing in 1947 of "British Standard 1363:1947 Fused-Plugs and Shuttered Socket-Outlets".

One of the other recommendations in the report was the introduction of the final ring circuit system (often informally called a "ring main"). In this arrangement a cable connected to a fuse, or circuit breaker, in the distribution board was wired in sequence to a number of sockets before being terminated back at the distribution board, thus forming a final ring circuit. In the final ring circuit, each socket-outlet was supplied with current by conductors on both sides of the 'loop.' This contrasts with the radial circuit system (which is also used in the UK, often in the same installation) wherein a single cable runs out radially, like a spoke, from the distribution board to serve a number of sockets. However, the BS 1363 system is not limited to use with final ring circuits being suitable for radial circuits.

BS 1363 gradually replaced BS 546 for most domestic purposes and installations both in Britain and other territories. India for example chose to continue use of the BS 546 system. Sri Lanka has made their SLS 734 standard (based on BS 1363) compulsory since 2017, banning the sale of "Indian" (BS 546 based) types. Saudi Arabia has also adopted the Type G plug as part of its national grid switching from 127 V to 230 V.

In Ireland, Schuko (Type F) was commonly installed until the 1960s. For safety reasons and to harmonize with the UK and thereby avoid having a different outlet type in Northern Ireland and the Republic of Ireland, the Republic standardised on BS 1363 (transposed into Irish Standards as IS 401 (Plug) and IS 411 (Socket outlet).

=== Evolution ===
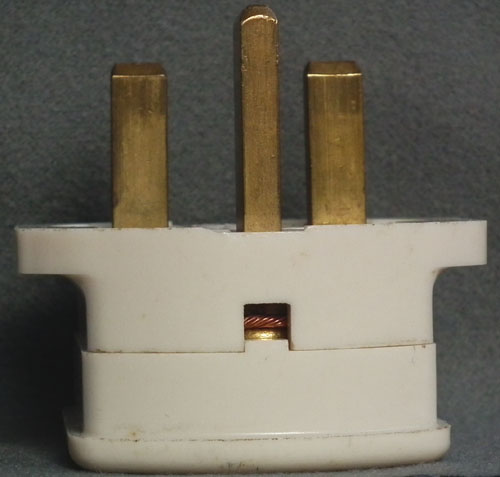
An early MK plug to the original version of the standard. Note the unsleeved line and neutral pins, and the inspection hole for the purpose of making the connection of an earth conductor visible with the cover in place (as required by BS 1363:1947 clause 15).

BS 1363 is periodically revised and with supplements and amendments issued between major revisions. BS 1363:1984 and earlier versions dealt only with 13 A plugs and sockets. From 1989 onwards the standard was rearranged into five parts as follows:

- Part 1: Rewirable and non-rewirable 13 A fused plugs
- Part 2: 13 A Switched and unswitched socket-outlets
- Part 3: Adaptors
- Part 4: 13 A fused connection units: switched and unswitched
- Part 5: 13 A fused conversion plugs

The following chronology shows revisions, supplements and significant amendments.

- June 1947: BS 1363:1947 "Fused-Plugs and Shuttered Socket-Outlets" published.
- May 1950: BS 1363:1947 Amendment 3, title changed to "Specification for two-pole and earthing-pin fused-plugs and shuttered socket-outlets for A.C. circuits up to 250 volts (not intended for use on D.C. circuits)".
- January 1957: BS 1363:1947 Amendment 5, added clause permitting operation of shutters by simultaneous insertion of two or more pins (in addition to original method using only earth pin).
- January 1957: BS 1363:1947 Supplement No. 1 added specification for surface mounted socket-outlets.
- 1957: Complementary standard published, BS 2814:1957 "Two-pole and earthing-pin flush-mounted 13-Amp switch socket-outlets for A.C. circuits up to 250 volts". A separate standard specifying a switched version of the BS 1363 socket-outlet for use with BS 1363 plugs.
- December 1960: BS 1363:1947 Supplement No. 2, added specification for Resilient Plugs.
- December 1961: BS 2814:1957 Amendment 2, title simplified to "13 Ampere Switch Socket-Outlets".
- 1962: BS 2814:1957 Supplement No. 1 added specification for surface mounted switch outlets.
- September 1967: BS 1363:1967 "Specification for 13A plugs, switched and unswitched socket-outlets and boxes" published. This standard superseded both BS 1363:1947 and BS 2814:1957. Only 3 A and 13 A fuses are specified. Resilient Plugs are included.
- August 1984: BS 1363:1984 "Specification for 13 A fused plugs switched and unswitched socket-outlets" published. This standard superseded BS 1363:1967. Changes include the introduction of sleeved pins on Line and Neutral, metric dimensions replacing inches, specifications added for non-rewirable plugs and portable socket-outlets. The standard was aligned, where possible, with the proposed IEC standard for domestic plugs and socket-outlets.
- February 1989: BS 1363-3:1989 "13 A plugs socket-outlets and adaptors - Part 3: Specification for adaptors" published. This new standard covers adaptors for use with BS 1363 socket-outlets and includes conversion adaptors (those which accept plugs of a different type), multiway adaptors (those which accept more than one plug, which may or may not be of a different type) and shaver adaptors. All adaptors (except for those accepting not more than two BS 1363 plugs) require to be fused. All sockets, including those to other standards, must be shuttered.
- 1994: A Product Approval Specification, PAS 003:1994, "Non-Rewirable 13 A Plugs with Plastic Socket Shutter Opening Pins" published. PAS 003 allowed for the design and approval of plugs without earthing intended for class II applications only. This was eventually superseded by Amendment 2:2003 to BS 1363-1:1995 but the PAS was not withdrawn until 23 July 2013.
- February 1995: BS 1363-1:1995 "13 A plugs socket-outlets adaptors and connection units - Part 1: Specification for rewirable and non-rewirable 13 A fused plugs" published. This standard, together with BS 1363-2:1995, supersedes BS 1363:1984. The provisions of PAS 003 are incorporated at the second amendment to BS 1363-1:1995 in 2003, but the plastic shutter opening pin is redesignated as an "ISOD" (insulated shutter opening device).
- September 1995: BS 1363-2:1995 "13 A plugs socket-outlets adaptors and connection units - Part 2: Specification for 13 A switched and unswitched socket-outlets" published.
- September 1995: BS 1363-3:1995 "13 A plugs socket-outlets adaptors and connection units - Part 3: Specification for adaptors" published. Supersedes BS 1363-3:1989
- November 1995: BS 1363-4:1995 "13 A plugs socket-outlets adaptors and connection units - Part 4: Specification for 13 A fused connection units switched and unswitched" published. A new standard.
- August 2008: BS 1363-5:2008 "13 A plugs socket-outlets adaptors and connection units - Part 5: Specification for 13 A fused conversion plugs" published. A new standard.
- May 2012: BS 1363-1:1995 +A4:2012 (Title unchanged) published. This amended standard allows switches to be incorporated into plugs, and introduced new overload tests amongst others. BS 1363-1:1995 remained current until 31 May 2015.
- May 2012: BS 1363-2:1995 +A4:2012 (Title unchanged) published. This amended standard adds a requirement that it shall not be possible to operate a shutter by the insertion of a two-pin Europlug, and introduced new temperature rise tests amongst others. BS 1363-2:1995 remained current until 31 May 2015.
- May 2012: BS 1363-4:1995 +A4:2012 (Title unchanged) published. Minor changes to BS 1363-4:1995 which remained current until 31 May 2015.
- November 2012: BS 1363-3:1995 +A4:2012 (Title unchanged) published. This amended standard adds a requirement that it shall not be possible to operate a shutter by the insertion of a two-pin Europlug, and added specifications for switched adaptors amongst others. BS 1363-3:1995 will remain current until 31 December 2015.
- August 2016: BS 1363-1:2016 (Title unchanged) published. Added requirements for incorporated electronic components and for electric vehicle charging. BS 1363-1:1995 +A4:2012 remained current until 31 August 2019.
- August 2016: BS 1363-2:2016 (Title unchanged) published. Added requirements for incorporated electronic components and for electric vehicle charging. BS 1363-2:1995 +A4:2012 remained current until 31 August 2019.
- August 2016: BS 1363-3:2016 (Title unchanged) published. Added requirements for incorporated electronic components. BS 1363-3:1995 +A4:2012 remained current until 31 August 2019.
- August 2016: BS 1363-4:2016 (Title unchanged) published. Minor changes only. BS 1363-4:1995 +A4:2012 remained current until 31 August 2019.
- August 2016: BS 1363-5:2016 (Title unchanged) published. Minor changes only. BS 1363-5:2008 remained current until 31 August 2019.
- February 2018: BS 1363-1:2016 +A1:2018 (Title unchanged) published. BS 1363‑1:2016 is withdrawn and BS 1363‑1:1995+A4:2012 remained current until 31 August 2019.

== Compatibility ==
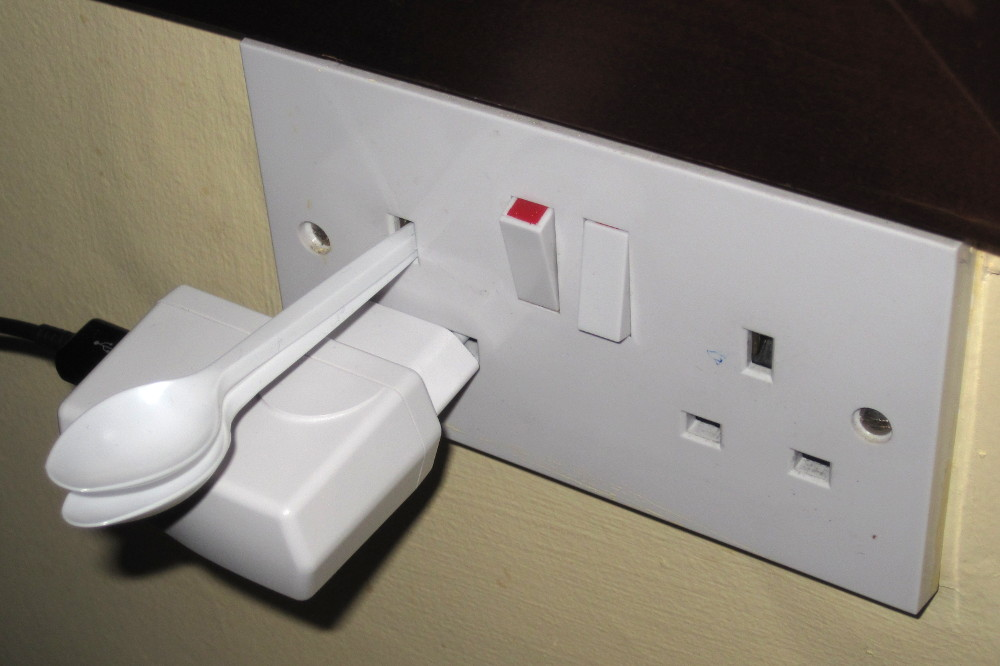
A Europlug informally inserted into a British socket; this act can pose a fire risk

Partly because of its rectangular pins, BS 1363 plugs are not physically compatible with any other socket system, including the BS 546 and the comparable grounded 3-pin Danish socket. Likewise, BS 1363 socket-outlets have no direct compatibility with other plugs. Some individuals have used a 'trick' to plug in an ungrounded Europlug by inserting an object (such as a pen) into the earth hole to unlock the shutters below. However, as the pins don't make full contact, it risks overheating the plug with higher power demand.

Adapters are therefore necessary for inter-compatibility. Officially, the BS 8546 specification has been made and applies to travel adaptors having at least one plug or socket-outlet portion compatible with BS 1363 plugs and socket-outlets. It was first published in April 2016 to provide a standard for travel adaptors suitable for the connection of a non-BS 1363 plug, or to a non-BS 1363 socket-outlet. It provides for an overall rating of 250 V AC, minimum current rating of 5 A, and a maximum of 13 A. Adaptors with BS 1363 plug pins must incorporate a BS 1362 fuse. BS 8546 travel adaptors may also include USB charging ports.

== International usage of BS 1363/Type G ==
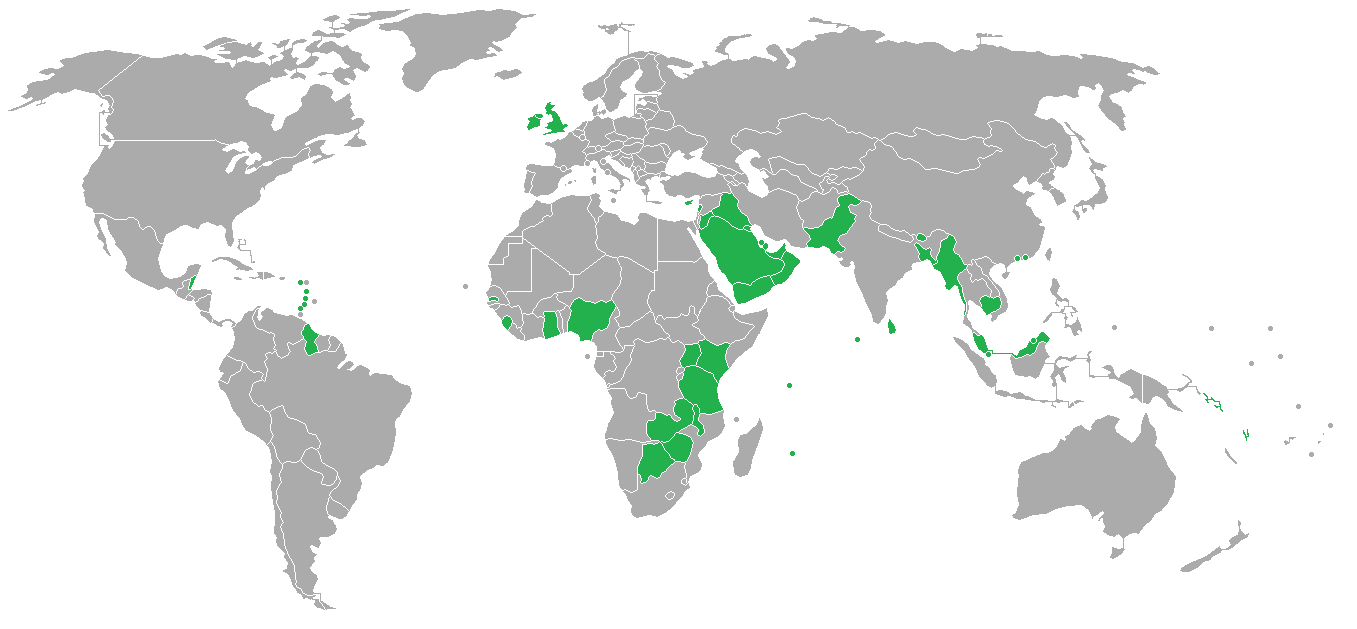
Countries that use (whether in part of full) type G (British) AC power plugs and sockets

BS 1363 (or Type G) is the primary domestic AC plug and socket system in Britain including the Isle of Man and the Channel Islands of Guernsey and Jersey, as well as in Bahrain, Brunei, Cyprus, Gibraltar, Hong Kong, Ireland, Kenya, Kuwait, Macao, Malawi, Malaysia, Malta, Oman, Qatar, Saudi Arabia, Singapore, Sri Lanka, Tanzania, United Arab Emirates, Uganda, Zambia and Zimbabwe. In some territories such as Nigeria or Pakistan, the Type G may be in regular use alongside other plug-socket systems (usually round-pin BS 546 or various CEE 7 ones).

=== Derived national standards ===
==== Irish I.S. 401 ====
Irish Standard 401:1997 Safety requirements for rewirable and non-rewirable 13 A fused plugs for normal and rough use having insulating sleeves on live and neutral pins is the equivalent of BS 1363 in Ireland issued by the National Standards Authority of Ireland (NSAI). The use of this standard is enforced by consumer protection legislation which requires that most domestic electrical goods sold in Ireland be fitted with an I.S. 401 plug.

==== Malaysian Standard MS 589 ====
MS 589 parts 1, 2, 3 and 4 correspond to BS 1363-1, BS 1363-2, BS 1363-3, and BS 1363-4.

==== Russian GOST 7396 ====
Group B2 of the GOST 7396 standard describes BS 1363 plugs and sockets.

==== Saudi Arabian Standard SASO 2203:2003 ====
SASO 2203:2003 Plugs and socket-outlets for household and similar general use 220 V was first specified in 1985. Previously it included the pan-European and "Iranian" (CEE 7) plugs and sockets as well as the old British and "South African" (BS 546) ones. The North American NEMA connector was then standardised and mainly used. SASO 2203 has specified the British BS 1363 as the standard plug for use within Saudi Arabia as of 2015.

==== Singapore Standard SS 145 ====
SS 145-1:2010 Specification for 13 A plugs and socket-outlets - Part 1 : Rewirable and non-rewirable 13 A fused plugs

SS 145-2:2010 Specification for 13 A plugs and socket-outlets - Part 2 : 13 A switched and unswitched socket-outlets

== See also ==
- AC power plugs and sockets: British and related types
