= Market surveillance =

Market surveillance for products ensures that products on the market conform to applicable laws and regulations. This helps to foster trust among consumers buying products or financial services and protects consumers and professionals from harm from non-compliant products. It also helps companies that comply to stay in business and avoid losing market share to rogue traders.

== European Union ==
In the European Union, individual member states are responsible for market surveillance but EU harmonisation legislation is considered necessary to guarantee the free movement of products within the Union, and any action undertaken regarding product safety for consumer products and other precautions for professional products is done under the auspices of the European Commission regulations. EU Regulation (EC) No 765/2008 applies to consumer products and regulation 2017/625 applies to food products. At the European Union level, three Directorates General are in charge: Health and consumers, Enterprise, and Customs.

Regulation (EU) 2019/1020 of the European Parliament and of the Council of 20 June 2019 on market surveillance and compliance of products had the effect of amending Directive 2004/42/EC and Regulations (EC) No 765/2008 and (EU) No 305/2011. Provision has been made for operational cooperation between UK and EU market surveillance authorities within the proposed EU–UK Trade and Cooperation Agreement of 2020. Market surveillance in the EU for (consumer) products was further strengthened by the introduction of Regulation (EU) 2023/988 on general product safety (GPSR), that included rules on accident reporting to authorities by manufacturers as well as reinforced market surveillance rules.

The European Free Trade Alliance is putting efforts in market surveillance.

=== Safety Gate (formerly RAPEX) ===
For consumer goods, an information system about dangerous goods has been set up, called Safety Gate (formerly RAPEX). Every week, products that were voluntarily recalled or banned by authorities are listed. RAPEX is one element of the General Product Safety Directive (GPSD) that ensures a high level of protection of consumers by stating key safety elements.

=== ADCO ===
The Administrative Cooperation Group. Representatives of Member States meet to exchange information and discuss implementation issues. The European Commission is also present. ADCO groups discuss specific laws like PED or EMC Electro Magnetic Compatibility and also LVD.

=== CE Marking ===
Within Europe most products are required to bear a CE mark. This is a self-certification achieved by complying with the appropriate Directive. The mark ensures that a product is safe from a variety of hazards. A specific individual bears legal responsibility for the mark and the compliance of the product.

=== Industry ===
European industry is asking for more market surveillance, from companies or industry associations. Market surveillance and border controls are essential to fulfill policy goals such as health and safety, environmental protection and level playing fields among economic operators.

If market surveillance fails, non-compliant products circulate and pose risks to end-users. Moreover, lawful manufacturers face unfair competition from rogue traders who do not invest in product compliance and traceability, which can add between 2% and 25% to product costs (depending on product category). It is estimated that a high percentage of cases of non-compliance in certain product categories discredit all products of this kind, even the compliant ones.

An industry support platform was launched in 2011. Its web-platform is designed to serve as a resource database of technical documents from European machinery industries. Information is available by sector and is made available in multiple languages. In addition, the website is enriched with testimonials and any other relevant information market surveillance.

European machinery industries that link in this initiative show firm commitment to help improve market surveillance for capital goods. This voluntary initiative can be seen as complementary to governmental efforts under the EU's New Legislative Framework for the marketing of products. It testifies to the commitment of industry to help maintain high levels of health, safety and environmental standards and ensures a level playing field in the single market.

=== Customs ===
European customs are now more involved in market surveillance. Regulation 768/2008 offers guidelines for more efficient protocols for products entering the European market.

== Lack of market surveillance ==
The lack of market surveillance has been pointed out by many players in Europe. At the European Parliament many voiced concern about the risk posed to the single market because of the lack of market surveillance. Compliance is easy to check for products such as clothes, but industrial products may be difficult to check due to lack of time or lack of knowledge.
