= Regulation (EU) 2019/1020 =

EU regulation on market surveillance

Regulation
- European Union regulation
- Title: Regulation (EU) 2019/1020 of the European Parliament and of the Council of 20 June 2019 on market surveillance and compliance of products and amending Directive 2004/42/EC and Regulations (EC) No 765/2008 and (EU) No 305/2011 (Text with EEA relevance.)
- Made by: European Parliament and Council
- Journal reference: L169, 25 June 2019, pp. 1–44

Other legislation
- Amends: Directive 2004/42/EC, Regulations (EC) No 765/2008 and (EU) No 305/2011

Regulation (EU) 2019/1020 is a regulation of the European Union on market surveillance and compliance of products. It aims to protect customers’ health and safety, the environment, and other public interests.

The regulation amended some New Legislative Framework laws: Directive 2004/42/EC and Regulations (EC) No 765/2008 and (EU) No 305/2011. It provides for operational cooperation between United Kingdom and EU market surveillance authorities, under the 2020 EU–UK Trade and Cooperation Agreement.
