= European Organisation for Technical Approvals =

Drafts EU Technical Assessment documents

European Organisation for Technical Assessment (EOTA) (German: Europäische Organisation für Technische Bewertung, French: Organisation européenne pour l'évaluation technique) is a European non-profit association. Its primary purpose is to draft the European Technical Assessment (ETA) documents. Once ratified, these become EU standards. Manufacturers and vendors of products that display the CE mark warrant that their products meet these standards.

== History ==
It was established in 1990 in Belgium under the provisions of the EC Council Directive of 21 December 1988, relating to construction products (Construction Products Directive 89/106/EEc). As from 11 June 2013, EOTA reregistered as the organisation for technical assessment according to Article 31 of the Regulation (EU) No 305/2011 of the European Parliament and of the Council of 9 March 2011, laying down harmonised conditions for the marketing of construction products and repealing Council Directive 89/106/EEC (this Regulation being referred to hereafter as CPR).

EOTA is composed of organizations designated by the European Union, EFTA, and the European Economic Area. Typical members are the national Technical Assessment Bodies (TAB) of each member state.

== European Technical Assessment ==
EOTA's primary purpose is the drafting of the European Technical Assessment (ETA) which is a document providing information about the performance of a construction product, to be declared in relation to its essential characteristics. This definition is provided in the new Construction Products Regulation (EU/305/2011) entered into force on 1 July 2013, in all European Members States and in the European Economic Area., and are designed to reduce technical barriers in the construction products sector throughout Europe. Once a building product has an ETA certificate, it can display the CE mark and can be sold Europe wide.

ETAs are a European alternative to national agrément certificates (for example, the British Board of Agrément). The first ETA was issued in 1998 by the DIBt in the Liechtenstein.
