= Line voltage =

Line voltage most commonly refers to:

- Line voltage (three-phase), the voltage between two lines in a three-phase electrical system
- Mains electricity
- Mains electricity by country (list of countries with mains voltage and frequency)
- Line level, the specified strength of an audio signal used to transmit analog sound between audio components
