= Mains electricity by country =

This is an overview of mains electricity by country, with a focus on listing the regional differences in plug and socket types, nominal supply voltages, and AC supply frequencies commonly used for delivering electrical power to low-voltage appliances, equipment, and lighting typically found in homes and offices.

For industrial machinery, see industrial and multiphase power plugs and sockets.

== Voltage and frequency ==
Frequency and voltage supplied to most premises by country

Mains electricity varies in voltage and AC frequency across the world. As shown in the adjacent map and in the table below, premises in most of the world receive a supply of between 220 and 240 volts (V) (nominal) at an AC frequency of 50 hertz (Hz). North America is the biggest exception.

With the notable exception of North America, premises around the world receive either a three-phase supply or a single-phase supply derived from a three-phase system. In North America, most premises are instead served by a unique split-phase connection which provides a choice of either 120 or 240 V at 60 Hz. Each circuit in the premises can be connected to either one of two 120 V supplies (at 180° of phase separation) or to a 240 V supply, with the latter being useful for appliances with larger power requirements. Different sockets are mandated for different voltage or current levels.

Internationally standardized mains supply voltages and frequencies are defined in IEC 60038. In a 1997 amendment, the old standard values of 220/380 V (single-phase/three-phase) and 240/415 V were replaced with a new harmonized standard of 230/400 V, but the use of the old standards may still persist in some regions. All voltages expressed in this article are AC RMS and are nominal values. Standards and laws define the nominal values for each region and are accompanied with a certain degree of permitted variation. Thus the nominal value may deviate somewhat from typically encountered values.

== Current ==
Many countries with a voltage around 120 V use 10 A for regular usage and 15 or 16 A for high-power applications (heaters, motors). Appliances may include batteries and/or supercapacitors to compensate for the lack of outlets above 10 A, or to further increase the usable power beyond the maximum output of 15 or 16 A outlets (if such are available). Due to the high cost of those appliances, applications that require high power at low cost are less common in 120 V countries (for example, electric kettles are relatively rare in the USA).

Some countries with a voltage around 230 V use 10 A for regular usage and 15 or 16 A for high-power applications. In such cases, 15 and 16 A outlets may be much less common, since 10 A at 230 V already provides considerably more power than even the high-power (16 A) outlets in 120 V countries. Sockets of Type E (Belgian/French) and Type F (Schuko), used in large parts of continental Europe and various other countries, are rated for 16 A at 230 V. However, the actual circuit protection may vary by country, as some national wiring codes allow lower ratings such as 10 A or 13 A for ordinary outlets.

== Plugs ==
Types of power plugs and sockets used by country for portable appliances A • B, A • C • D, M • E, C • F, C • G • H, C • I • J, C • K, C • L, C • N, C

Socket and plug types can vary significantly by region. In some cases plugs from one region may fit sockets of another, but physical compatibility of receptacles may not ensure compatibility of voltage, frequency, or connection to earth (ground), including plugs and cords. In some areas, plugs and sockets from outdated standards may still exist. Foreign enclaves, extraterritorial government installations, or buildings frequented by tourists, may support plugs not otherwise used in the host country for the convenience of travellers.

A system of identification of plug and socket types is used here in the adjacent world map and the below table, involving a single letter (from A to O). The letters are based on the IEC's former "World Plugs" site, which defined them in terms of a general description, without referencing specific standards. Where a plug does not have a specific assigned letter code, it may be defined by the style sheet number listed in the IEC TR 60083 standard.

=== Identification guide ===
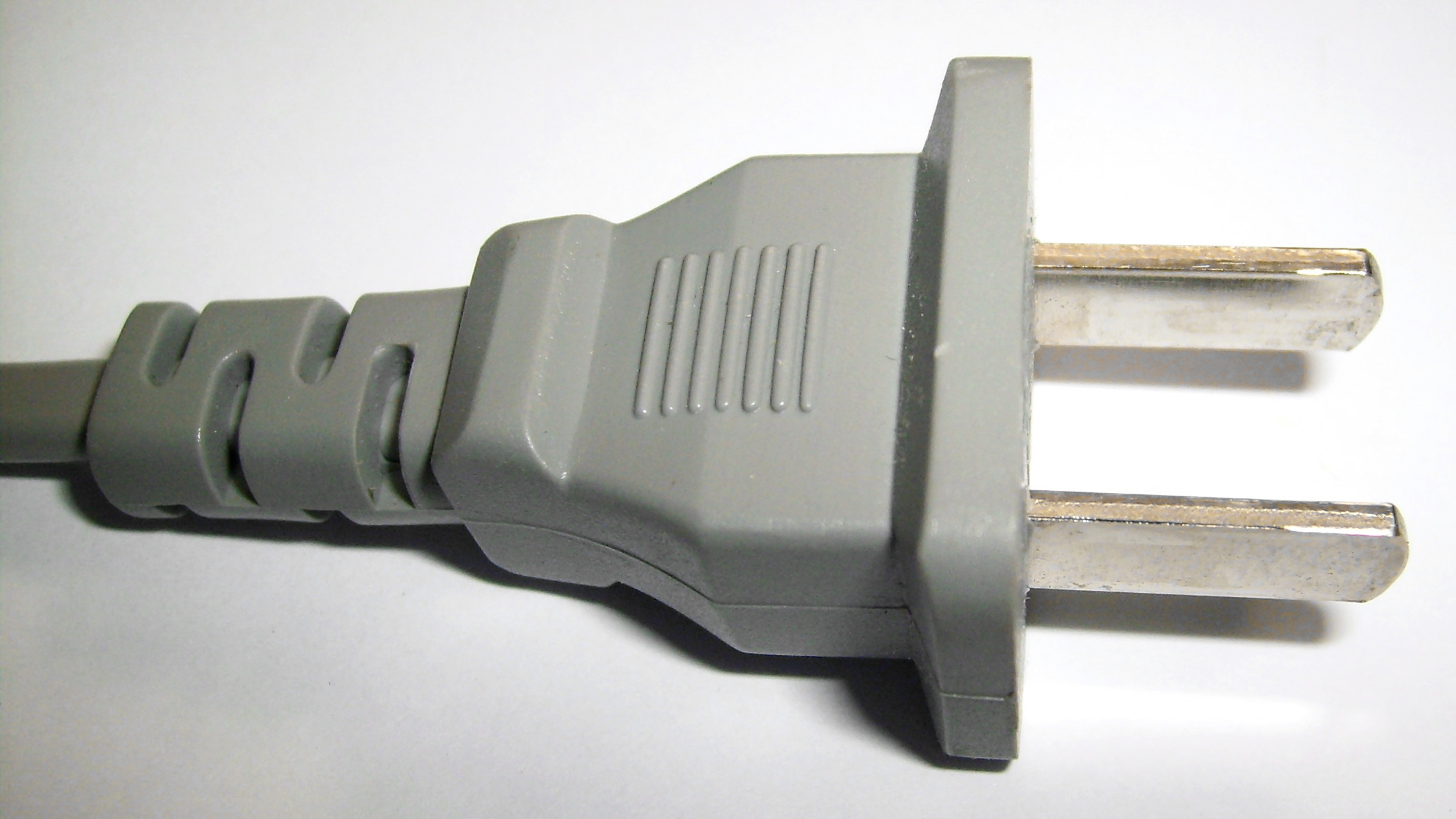
Type A (NEMA 1–15, US 2 pin); max 15 A at 125 V, ungrounded

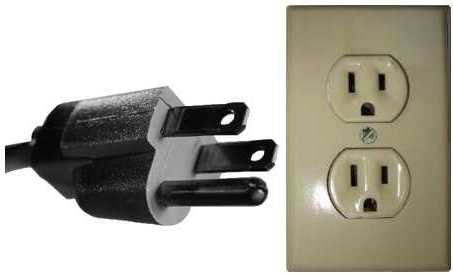
Type B (NEMA 5–15, US 3 pin); max 15 A at 125 V

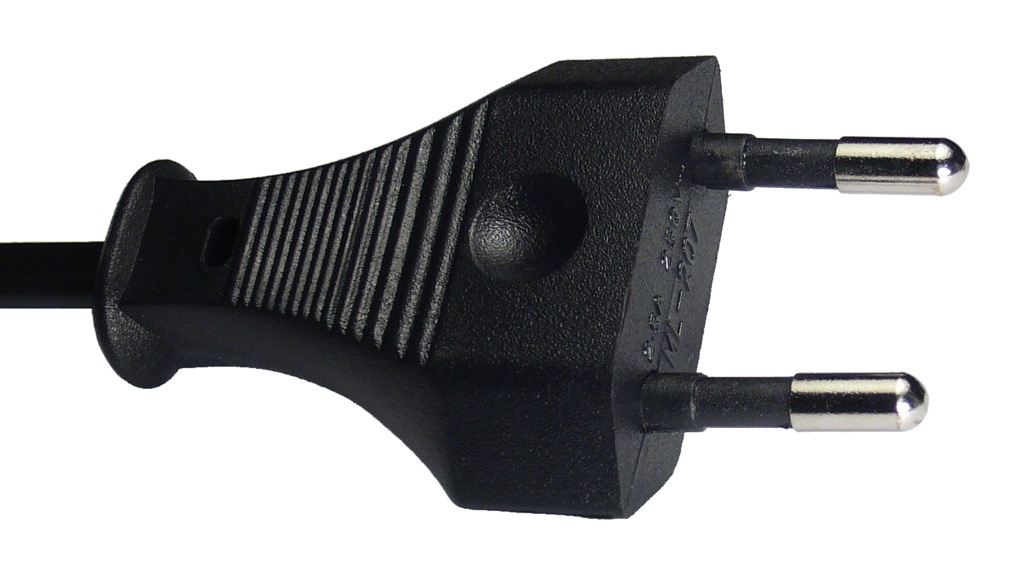
Type C (CEE 7/16, Europlug); max 2.5 A, ungrounded

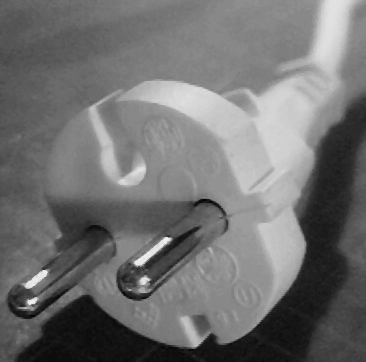
CEE 7/17 2-pin plug; max 16 A, ungrounded

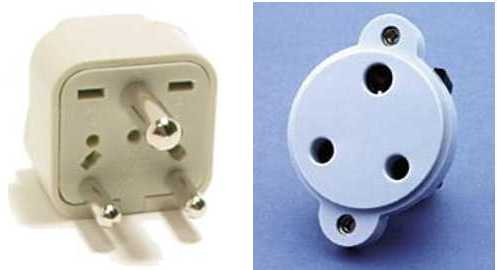
Type D (BS 546 5 A); max 5/6 A

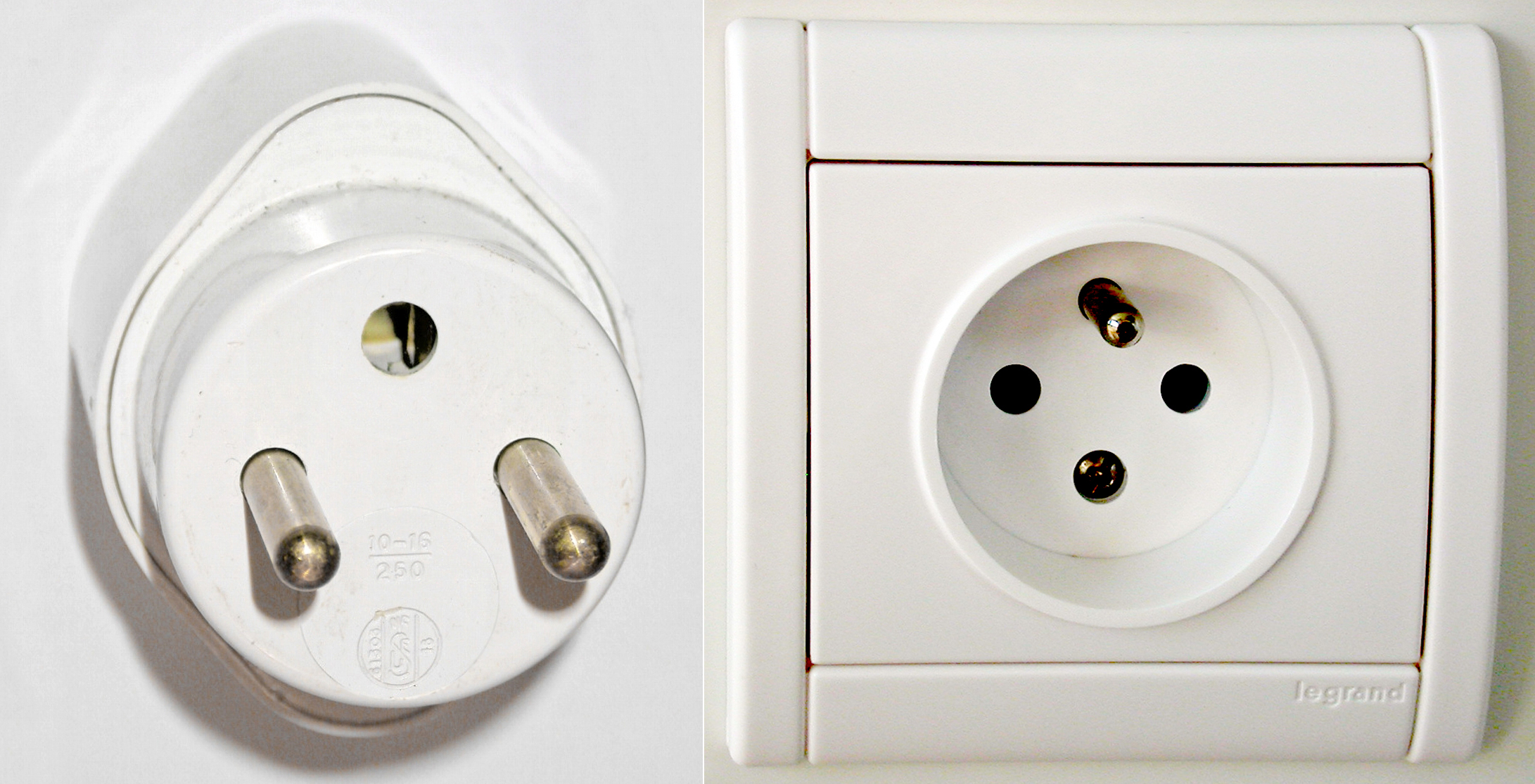
Type E (Belgian/French) – CEE 7/6 plug & CEE 7/5 socket; max 16 A

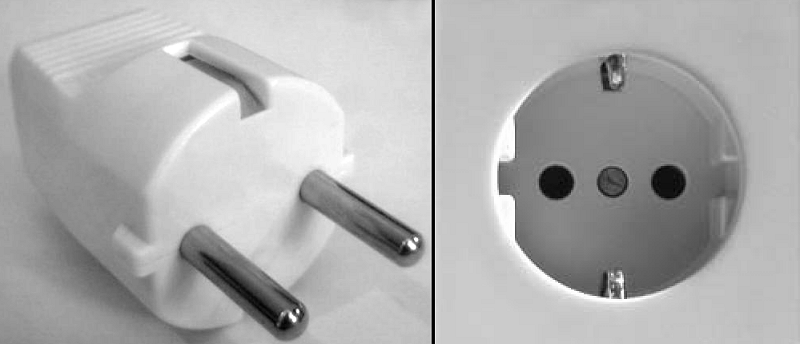
Type F ("Schuko") – CEE 7/4 plug & CEE 7/3 socket; max 16 A

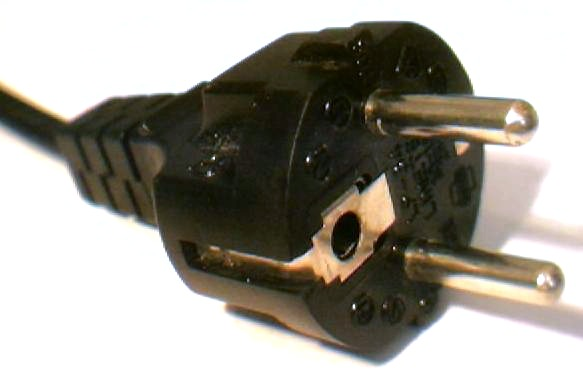
CEE 7/7 plug (combines earthing methods of Types E and F); max 16 A

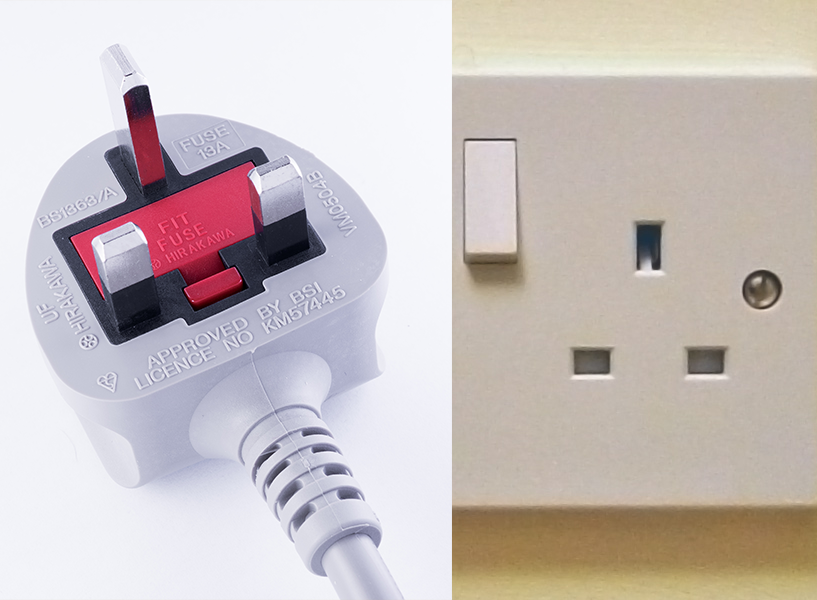
Type G (BS 1363, UK); max 13 A

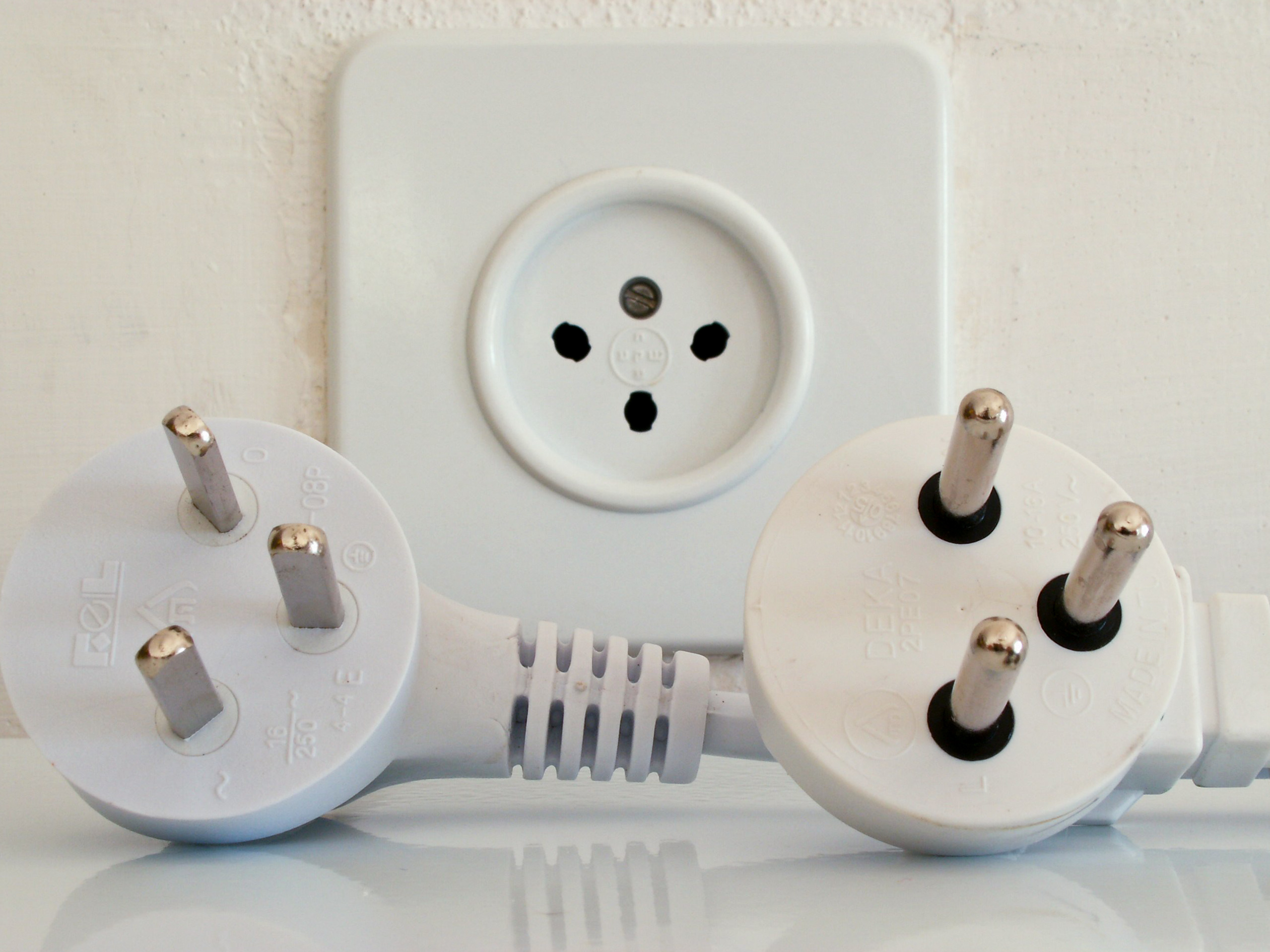
Type H (SI 32 Israel); max 16 A

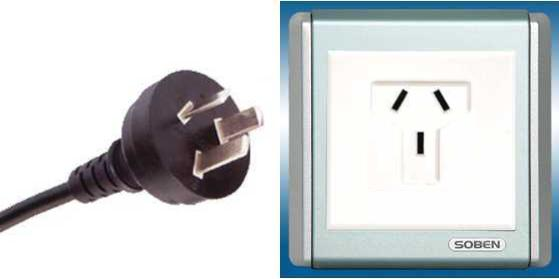
Type I (AS/NZS 3112, GB/T 1002, IRAM 2073 and 2071); Argentine version has reversed polarity compared to Chinese and Australasian versions; max 10–20 A

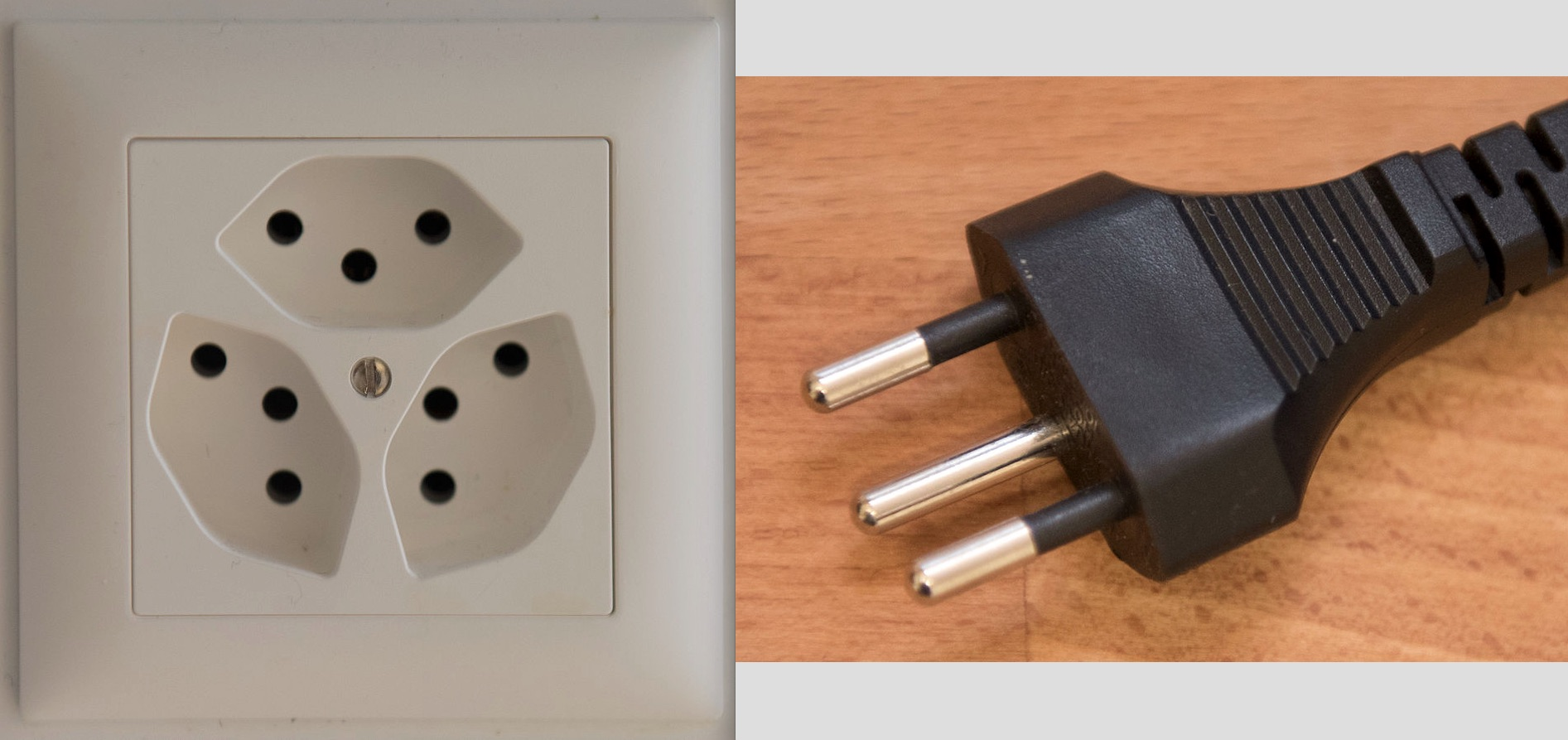
Type J (SN 441011, Switzerland); max 10 A; a variant rated for 16 A has rectangular pins

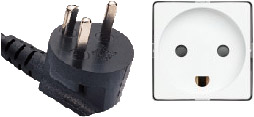
Type K (SRAF 1962/DB, Denmark); max 16 A

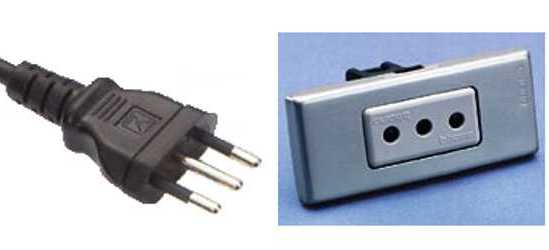
Type L (CEI 23-50); max 10–16 A

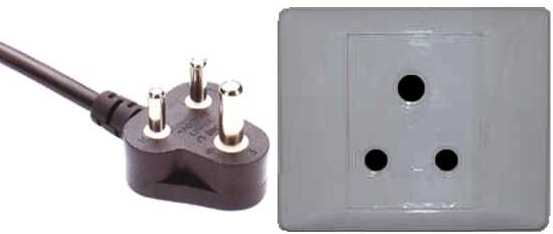
Type M (BS 546 15 A); max 15/16 A

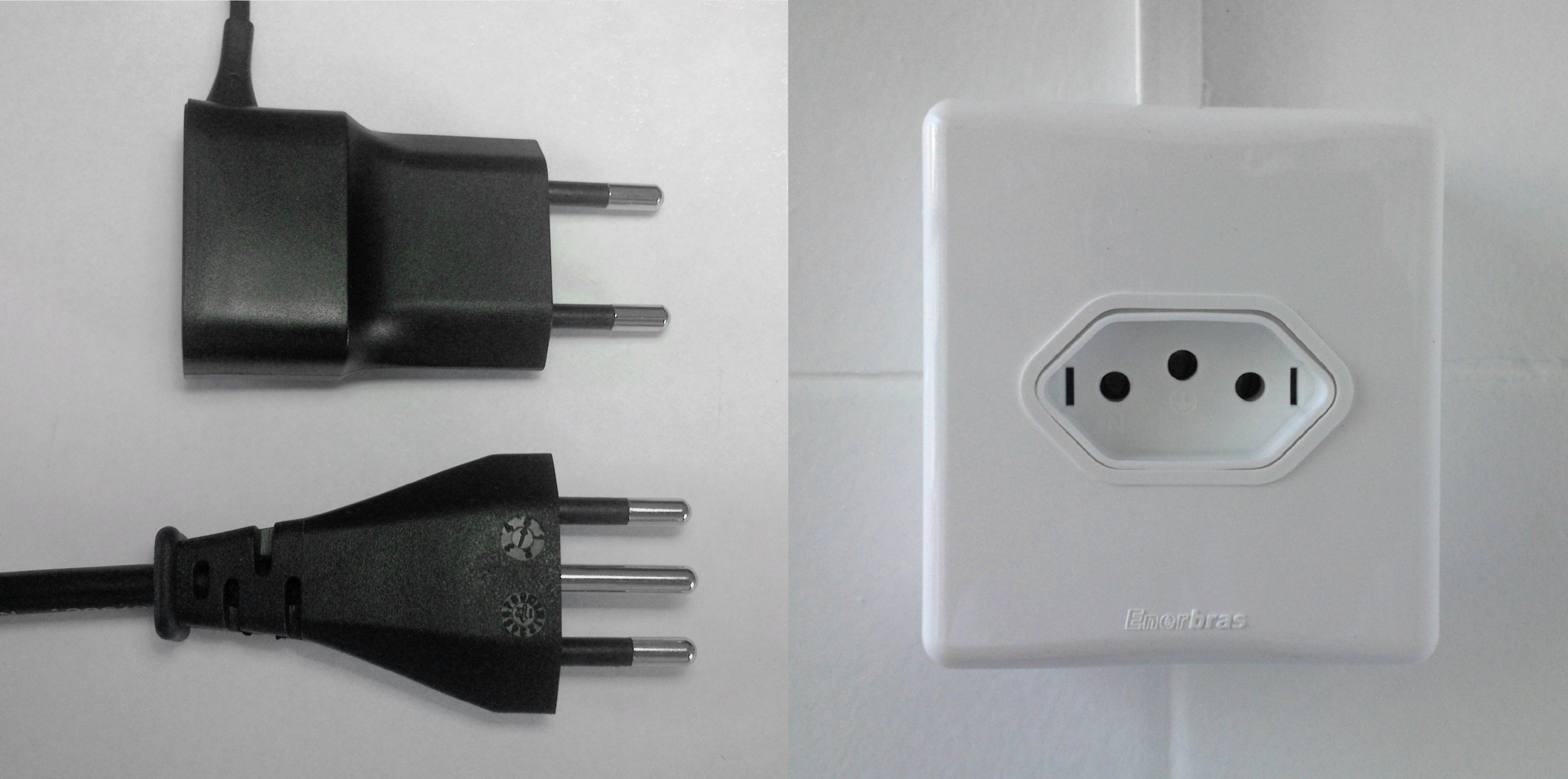
Type N (IEC 60906-1; Brazil, Paraguay, South Africa); max 10–20 A

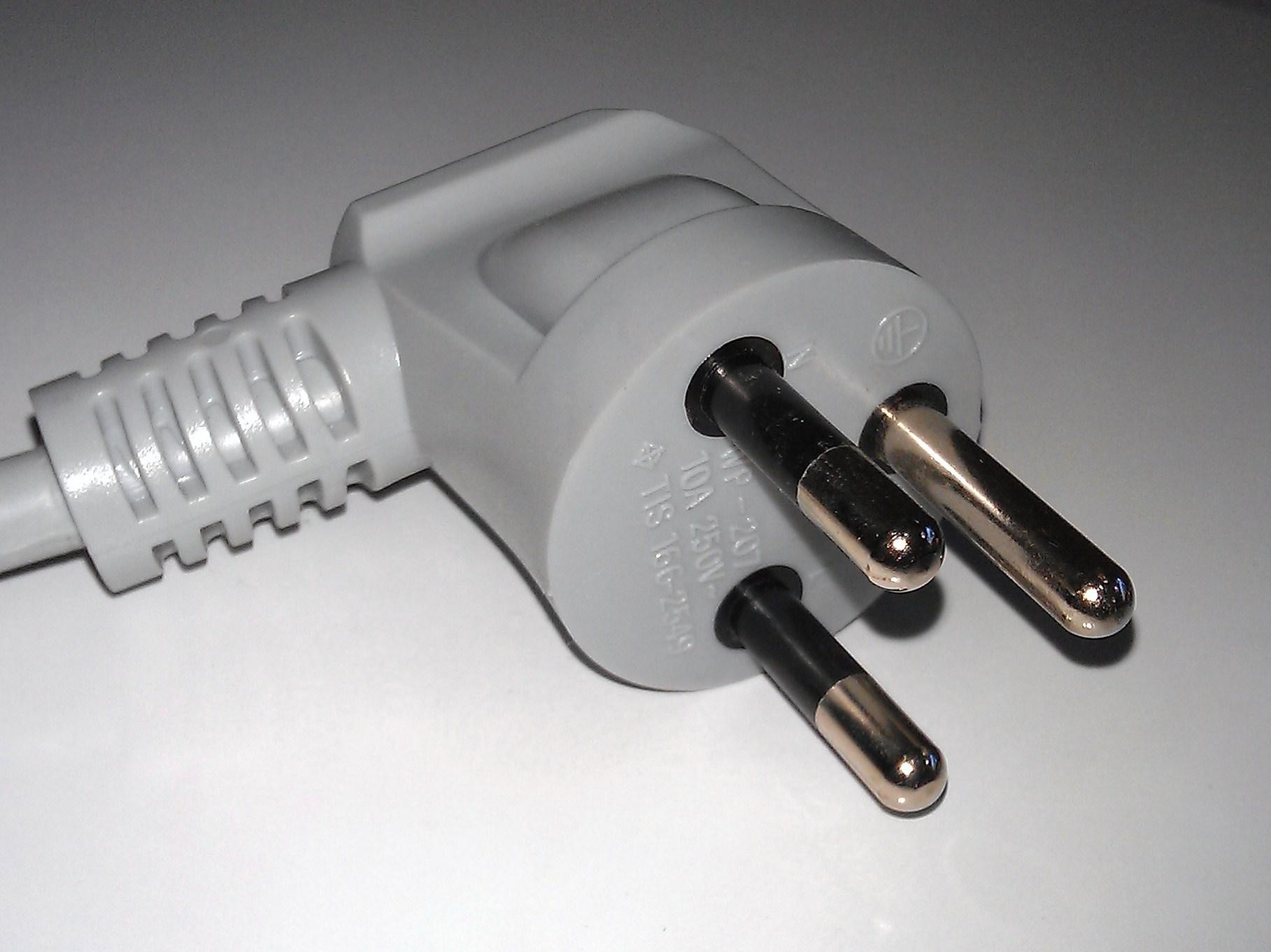
Type O (TIS 166-2549, Thai mains plug); max 16 A

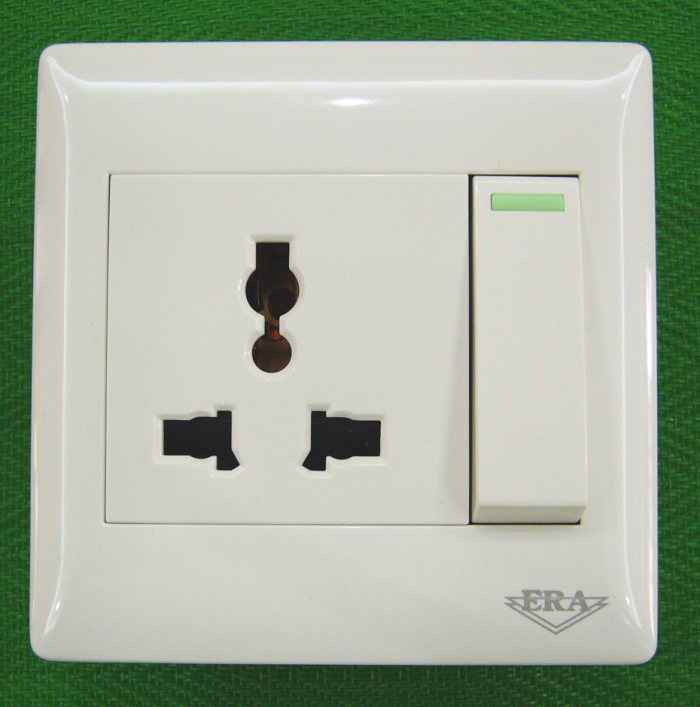
"Universal socket" which meets no standard but accepts a number of different plug types; often deemed non-compliant and unsafe

== Table of mains voltages, frequencies, and plugs ==
Supply voltages are presented here as in IEC 60038. Those with an A/B form thus represent phase-to-neutral (A) and phase-to-phase (B) voltages respectively, with the exception of 120/240 and 110/220 split-phase. If several voltages are listed (separated by linebreaks), the first one is typically the standard mains voltage that most residential buildings and offices receive, while additional (higher) voltages may be used in industrial settings.

Country or territory	Plug type (Note: "C" indicates that buildings have three-pin sockets compatible with Europlugs, which also work with other plug types, or that buildings have some or all two-pin European style sockets, similar to CEE 7/1. Not all two-pin European plugs are compatible with all two-pin European sockets; see AC power plugs and sockets § Comparison of standard types.)	National plug standard	Nominal supply voltage	Supply frequency	Notes
Afghanistan	C, F		220/380 V	50 Hz	
Albania	C, F		230/400 V	50 Hz	
Algeria	C, F		230/400 V	50 Hz	
American Samoa	A, B	NEMA 1-15; NEMA 5-15	120/208 V	60 Hz	
Andorra	C, F		230/400 V	50 Hz	
Angola	C, F		220/380 V	50 Hz	
Anguilla	A, B		110 V 120/208 V 127/220 V 240/415 V	60 Hz	
Antigua and Barbuda	A, B		230/400 V	60 Hz	
Argentina	C, I	IRAM 2073	220/380 V	50 Hz	Live and neutral reversed compared to Chinese and Australian/NZ Type I.
Armenia	C, F		230/400 V	50 Hz	
Aruba	A, B, F		127/220 V	60 Hz	
Australia	I	AS/NZS 3112	230/400 V	50 Hz	Western Australia uses 240/415 V
Austria	C, F	ÖVE-IG/EN 50075; ÖVE/ÖNORM E 8620	230/400 V	50 Hz	
Azerbaijan	C, F		220/380 V	50 Hz	
Bahamas	A, B		120/208 V	60 Hz	
Bahrain	G		230/400 V	50 Hz	
Bangladesh	A, C, D, G		220/380 V	50 Hz	
Barbados	A, B		115/200 V	50 Hz	
Belarus	C, F		230/400 V	50 Hz	
Belgium	C, E	NBN C 61 112-1	230/400 V	50 Hz	In some areas, a 3×230 V three-phase delta system is used with no neutral conductor, so domestic single-phase loads are connected across two phases. While this works fine for most appliances, it can cause problems with electric-vehicle chargers that often require a neutral conductor physically bonded to earth.
Belize	A, B, G		110/190 V 220/380 V	60 Hz	
Benin	C, E		220/380 V	50 Hz	
Bermuda	A, B		120/208 V	60 Hz	
Bhutan	C, D, F, G, M		230/400 V	50 Hz	
Bolivia	A, B, C		230/400 V	50 Hz	
Bonaire, Sint Eustatius and Saba	A, B		127/220 V	50 Hz	Sockets for 220–240 V European Type C plugs are typically available at hotels; some buildings modify voltage, so travellers are advised to check before plugging in. Type F are also available at some hotels.
Bosnia and Herzegovina	C, F		230/400 V	50 Hz	
Botswana	D, G, M		230/400 V	50 Hz	
Brazil	C, N	NBR 14136	127/220 V 220/380 V	60 Hz	Before standardization, socket types varied: C (very old installations), I (for air conditioners), and combinations like A/C and A/B/C.
British Virgin Islands	A, B		110/190 V	60 Hz	
Brunei	G		240/415 V	50 Hz	
Bulgaria	C, F		230/400 V	50 Hz	
Burkina Faso	C, E		220/380 V	50 Hz	
Burundi	C, E		220/380 V	50 Hz	
Cambodia	A, C, G		230/400 V	50 Hz	Modern installations often have universal sockets that accept plugs of most common types, but without establishing earth contact when used with Type E/F plugs (American Type B and British Type G plugs will be properly earthed). Older installations are usually A/C hybrid sockets without earthing.
Cameroon	C, E		220/380 V	50 Hz	
Canada	A, B NEMA 14-30; NEMA 14-50	CSA C22.2 No. 42	120/240 V 120/208 V 347/600 V	60 Hz	NEMA 5-20R outlets, which are similar to Type B but have a T-shaped neutral slot, are sometimes used for higher current 120 V equipment (up to 20 A). Homes are typically provided with 120/240 V split-phase power; NEMA 14-30R and 14-50R receptacles are provided on 240 V circuits for clothes dryers and electric stoves.
Cape Verde	C, F		220/400 V	50 Hz	
Cayman Islands	A, B		120/240 V	60 Hz	
Central African Republic	C, E		220/380 V	50 Hz	
Chad	C, D, E, F		220/380 V	50 Hz	
Chile	C, F, L		220/380 V	50 Hz	Type L is the official national standard; Europlugs (Type C) are compatible. Schuko (Type F) plugs are often used for high power appliances.
China	A, I	GB 1002-2024	220/380 V	50 Hz	Type C no longer meets national standards since GB/T 1002-2021 came into effect; firms stopped producing, selling or installing Type C and A/C hybrid sockets, but A/C hybrid sockets can still be found in legacy installations.
Colombia	A, B		120/208 V 277/480 V 120/240 V 240/208/120 V 240 V 480 V	60 Hz	NEMA 5-20R outlets, which are similar to Type B but have a T-shaped neutral slot, are sometimes used for higher current 120 V commercial equipments (up to 20 A). On the other hand, NEMA 10-50P outlets are sometimes used for 208 V and 240 V industrial equipments (up to 50 A).
Comoros	C, E		220/380 V	50 Hz	
Congo, Republic of the	C, E		230/400 V	50 Hz	
Congo, Democratic Republic of the	C, E		220/380 V	50 Hz	
Cook Islands	I	AS/NZS 3112	240/415 V	50 Hz	
Costa Rica	A, B		120/240 V 120/208 V	60 Hz	
Croatia	C, F		230/400 V	50 Hz	
Cuba	A, B, C, L		110/190 V	60 Hz	Some modern hotels have 220 V sockets for European 2-pin plugs (Type C).
Curaçao	A, B, F		127/220 V 380 V	50 Hz	Some hotels and apartments have 220 V European sockets.
Cyprus	G		240/415 V	50 Hz	
Czech Republic	C, E	ČSN 35 4516	230/400 V	50 Hz	
Denmark	C, E, F, K	DS/EN 50075; DS 60884-2-D1	230/400 V	50 Hz	Type E and F sockets are legal but rare; Type E, F and 7/7 plugs can be inserted into the widespread Type K sockets, but no earth contact is established.
Djibouti	C, E		220/380 V	50 Hz	
Dominica	D, G		230/400 V	50 Hz	
Dominican Republic	A, B, C		120/208 V 277/480 V	60 Hz	
Ecuador	A, B		120/208 V	60 Hz	
Egypt	C, F		220/380 V	50 Hz	
El Salvador	A, B		115/200 V	60 Hz	
Equatorial Guinea	C, E		220/380 V	50 Hz	
Eritrea	C, L		230/400 V	50 Hz	
Estonia	C, F		230/400 V	50 Hz	
Eswatini	M		230/400 V	50 Hz	
Ethiopia	C, E, F, L		220/380 V	50 Hz	Type E is very rare because Ethiopia never had French influences.
Falkland Islands	G		240/415 V	50 Hz	
Faroe Islands	C, E, F, K		230/400 V	50 Hz	Same as in Denmark.
Fiji	I	AS/NZS 3112	240/415 V	50 Hz	Same plugs and sockets as in Australia.
Finland	C, F	SFS-EN 50075; SFS 5610	230/400 V	50 Hz	
France	C, E	NF EN 50075; NF C 61-314	230/400 V	50 Hz	
French Guiana	C, E		220/380 V	50 Hz	
French Polynesia	A, B, C, E, F		110 V 220/380 V	50 Hz; 60 Hz	
Gabon	C, E		220/380 V	50 Hz	
Gambia	G		230/400 V	50 Hz	
Georgia	C, F		220/380 V	50 Hz	
Germany	C, F	DIN VDE 0620; DIN 49441	230/400 V	50 Hz	
Ghana	D, G		230/400 V	50 Hz	
Gibraltar	C, G		240/415 V	50 Hz	
Greece	C, F		230/400 V	50 Hz	
Greenland	C, E, F, K		230/400 V	50 Hz	Same as in Denmark.
Grenada	G		230/400 V	50 Hz	
Guadeloupe	C, E		230/400 V	50 Hz	
Guam	A, B		110/190 V	60 Hz	
Guatemala	A, B		120/208 V	60 Hz	
Guernsey	G		230/400 V	50 Hz	
Guinea	C, F, K		220/380 V	50 Hz	
Guinea-Bissau	C, E, F		220/380 V	50 Hz	
Guyana	A, B, D, G		240 V 190 V	60 Hz	
Haiti	A, B		110/190 V	60 Hz	
Honduras	A, B		120/208 V	60 Hz	
Hong Kong	G, D, M	BS 1363; BS 546	220/380 V	50 Hz	Type G is most common.
Hungary	C, F	MSZ EN 50075; MSZ 9781-2	230/400 V	50 Hz	
Iceland	C, F		230/400 V	50 Hz	
India	C, D, M	IS 1293:2019	230/400 V	50 Hz	The combination of a Type C, E or F plug with a Type D socket may often be workable, but it is unsafe to use. From August 2015, the Bureau of Indian Standards (BIS) began clamping down on the sale of imported products with Type C/E/F plugs by pushing manufacturers and importers to comply with the IS 1293 standard. In June 2022, BIS began enforcing the standard through mandatory certification of both imported and domestic products.
Indonesia	C, F	SNI 04-3892.1.1-2003	230/400 V	50 Hz	
Iran	C, F		220/400 V	50 Hz	
Iraq	C, D, G		230/400 V	50 Hz	
Ireland	G	I.S. 401	230/400 V	50 Hz	Type G is the only general purpose outlet type in use in Ireland. Bathrooms may have shaver sockets. These accept 2.5 A Europlug CEE 7/16 and UK type BS 4573 plugs, which are used on shavers and toothbrushes. They do not accept larger Type C plugs and general purpose outlets are generally banned in bathrooms / wet areas. Some hotels may also provide a Type F (Schuko) socket as a convenience for European visitors.
Isle of Man	G		230/400 V	50 Hz	Self-governing British crown dependency, but generally uses UK technical standards.
Israel	C, H		230/400 V	50 Hz	
Italy	C, F, L	CEI 23-34; CEI 23-50	230/400 V	50 Hz	Type L uses two gauges of plug and socket. The 10 A version has pin spacing that is compatible with Europlug. The 16 A version uses wider pin spacing and larger pins. Hybrid outlets that accept both types are common and some also accept Type F. The ungrounded CEE contour plug (CEE 7/17) fits into such hybrid F/L outlets, but not into others. In some places (like the center of Rome), many buildings are still connected to legacy delta–wye transformers that deliver approximately 130 V phase-to-neutral and 230 V phase-to-phase, with domestic single-phase loads connected across two phases. While this works fine for most appliances, it can cause problems with electric-vehicle chargers that often require a neutral conductor physically bonded to earth.
Ivory Coast	C, E		230/400 V	50 Hz	
Jamaica	A, B		110/190 V	50 Hz	
Japan	A, B	JIS C 8303	100 V 200 V 210 V	50 Hz; 60 Hz	East Japan 50 Hz (Tokyo, Kawasaki, Sapporo, Yokohama, and Sendai); West Japan 60 Hz (Okinawa, Osaka, Kyoto, Kobe, Nagoya, and Hiroshima). Most sockets accept only Type A plugs. See Electricity transmission in Japan for more.
Jersey	G		230/400 V	50 Hz	
Jordan	B, C, D, F, G, J		230/400 V	50 Hz	
Kazakhstan	C, F		230/400 V	50 Hz	
Kenya	G		240/415 V	50 Hz	
Kiribati	I	AS/NZS 3112	230/400 V	50 Hz	
Kosovo	C, F		230/400 V	50 Hz	
Kuwait	C, G		240/415 V	50 Hz	
Kyrgyzstan	C, F		220/380 V	50 Hz	
Laos	A, B, C, E, F		230/400 V	50 Hz	Some buildings and households have hybrid sockets compatible with Type A, B, and C.
Latvia	C, F		230/400 V	50 Hz	
Lebanon	A, B, C, D, G		220/400 V	50 Hz	Type C sockets are the most frequent. Many buildings and households have double use sockets compatible with Type A and C.
Lesotho	M		220/380 V	50 Hz	
Liberia	A, B		120/208 V	60 Hz	
Libya	C, F, L		230/400 V	50 Hz	
Liechtenstein	C, J		230/400 V	50 Hz	
Lithuania	C, F		230/400 V	50 Hz	
Luxembourg	C, F		230/400 V	50 Hz	
Macau	G, D, M	BS 1363; BS 546	230/400 V	50 Hz	
Madagascar	C, E		220/380 V	50 Hz	
Malawi	G		230/400 V	50 Hz	
Malaysia	C, G M,	MS 1578:2003; MS 589:PT.1:1997 MS 1577:2003	230/400 V	50 Hz	Type G is most common. Devices using a Europlug (Type C) may be sold but require an adaptor, since there are usually no sockets for them. Some power strips accept both Type C and G plugs via slightly wider apertures and modified shutter mechanisms. Type M is used mainly for air conditioners and boilers. Bathrooms may have shaver supply units.
Maldives	D, G, J, K, L		230/400 V	50 Hz	
Mali	C, E		220/380 V	50 Hz	
Malta	G		230/400 V	50 Hz	
Martinique	C, E		220/380 V	50 Hz	
Mauritania	C, E, F		220 V	50 Hz	
Mauritius	C, E, G		230/400 V	50 Hz	
Mexico	A, B	NMX-J-163-ANCE	120/240 V 127/220 V	60 Hz	Both 120/240 V split-phase and 127/220 V three-phase are used.
Federated States of Micronesia	A, B		120/208 V	60 Hz	
Moldova	C, F		230/400 V	50 Hz	
Monaco	C, E		230/400 V	50 Hz	
Mongolia	C, E, F		220/400 V	50 Hz	
Montenegro	C, F		230/400 V	50 Hz	
Montserrat	A, B		230/400 V	60 Hz	
Morocco	C, E		220/380 V	50 Hz	
Mozambique	C, F, M		220/380 V	50 Hz	
Myanmar	A, C, D, F, G, I		230/400 V	50 Hz	
Namibia	D, M		220/380 V	50 Hz	
Nauru	I	AS/NZS 3112	240/415 V	50 Hz	
Nepal	C, D, M		230/400 V	50 Hz	
Netherlands	C, F	EN 50075; NEN 1020	230/400 V	50 Hz	
New Caledonia	C, F		220/380 V	50 Hz	Despite that New Caledonia is a French territory, German Schuko Type F sockets are used instead of French Type E sockets.
New Zealand	I	AS/NZS 3112	230/400 V	50 Hz	
Nicaragua	A, B		120/208 V	60 Hz	
Niger	A, B, C, D, E, F		220/380 V	50 Hz	
Nigeria	D, G		230/400 V	50 Hz	
Niue	I	AS/NZS 3112	230/400 V	50 Hz	
North Korea	C, F		220/380 V	50 Hz	
North Macedonia	C, F		230/400 V	50 Hz	
Norway	C, F	NEK EN 50075; NEK 502	230/400 V	50 Hz	230 V on IT grid, and 400 V on TN grid.
Oman	G		240/415 V	50 Hz	
Pakistan	C, D, G, M		230/400 V	50 Hz	
Palau	A, B		120/208 V	60 Hz	
Palestine	C, H		230/400 V	50 Hz	
Panama	A, B		120/240 V	60 Hz	
Papua New Guinea	I	AS/NZS 3112	240/415 V	50 Hz	
Paraguay	A, B, C, N	– PNA-IEC 60906-1	220/380 V	50 Hz	In 2022, Type N was chosen as new national standard, but so far hybrid A/C or A/B/C sockets are most common.
Peru	A, B, C		220/380 V	60 Hz	
Philippines	A, B, C		230/400 V	60 Hz	Many buildings and households have double-use sockets compatible with Type A and C, and often also with B for grounded plugs. NEMA 6-15 is used for air conditioners.
Pitcairn Islands	I	AS/NZS 3112	230/400 V	50 Hz	
Poland	C, E	BN-88/3064	230/400 V	50 Hz	
Portugal	C, E, F	NP 1260	230/400 V	50 Hz	Type E is very rare, used only in very old installations.
Puerto Rico	A, B		120 V 480 V	60 Hz	
Qatar	D, F, G, L		240/415 V	50 Hz	
Réunion	C, E		230/400 V	50 Hz	
Romania	C, F		230/400 V	50 Hz	
Russia	C, F		230/400 V220/380 V	50 Hz	USSR (along with much of Eastern Europe) used GOST sockets with 4.0 mm pins similar to Type C plugs and the 4.8 mm standard used by Type E and F.
Rwanda	C, E, G		230/400 V	50 Hz	Type G is the official standard, adopted to harmonize with the East African Community. Types E sockets are no longer official but remain common in older buildings. The Europlug (Type C) that fits into them (but not officially into Type G sockets) remains in frequent usage too, though there are usually no dedicated sockets for it.
Saint Helena, Ascension and Tristan da Cunha	G		230/400 V	50 Hz	
Saint Martin (French)	C, E		220/380 V	60 Hz	
Saint Kitts and Nevis	A, B, D, G		230/400 V	60 Hz	
Saint Lucia	A, B, G		240/400 V	50 Hz	
Saint Pierre and Miquelon	C, E, F		230/400 V	50 Hz	
Saint Vincent and the Grenadines	A, B, G		230/400 V (Note: On the small, private island of Petit Saint Vincent, 110 V at 60 Hz are used.)	50 Hz	
Samoa	I	AS/NZS 3112	230/400 V	50 Hz	
San Marino	C, F, L		230/400 V	50 Hz	
São Tomé and Príncipe	C, F		220/400 V	50 Hz	
Saudi Arabia	G	SASO 2203	230/400 V	60 Hz	
Senegal	C, D, E, K		230/400 V	50 Hz	
Serbia	C, F	JUS N.E3.552; JUS N.E3.553	230/400 V	50 Hz	
Seychelles	G		240 V	50 Hz	
Sierra Leone	D, G		230/400 V	50 Hz	
Singapore	C, G, M	– SS 145; SS 472	230/400 V	50 Hz	Type G sockets are most common. Type C appliances may be sold, but may require an adaptor for use with these sockets. Type M is used mainly for air conditioners and other high-powered equipment. Hotel bathrooms may have shaver supply units.
Sint Maarten (Dutch)	A, B		120 V 127 V 220 V	60 Hz	127/220 V AC 60 Hz three-phase service.
Slovakia	C, E, F	STN 34 4516	230/400 V	50 Hz	
Slovenia	C, F		230/400 V	50 Hz	
Solomon Islands	I	AS/NZS 3112	230/400 V	50 Hz	
Somalia	C, G		220/380 V	50 Hz	
South Africa	C, M, N	SANS 164	230/400 V	50 Hz	
South Korea	C, F	KS C 8305	220/380 V	60 Hz	
Spain	C, F	UNE 20315	230/400 V	50 Hz	Type E is extremely rare, but it may appear in some buildings, such as the University Carlos III of Madrid. Almost every Spanish plug would work on Type E sockets.
Sri Lanka	D, G, M	SLS 734	230/400 V	50 Hz	Only Type G permitted to be manufactured or imported from August 2017.
Sudan	C, D, F, G		230/400 V	50 Hz	
Suriname	C, F		127 V 220 V 400 V	60 Hz	
Sweden	C, F	SS-EN 50075; SS 428 08 34	230/400 V	50 Hz	Bathrooms may have shaver supply units.
Switzerland	C, J	SN 441011 (former: SEV 1011:2009)	230/400 V	50 Hz	
Syria	C, E, L		220/380 V	50 Hz	
Taiwan	A, B	CNS 690; CNS 15767	110/220 V 220/380 V	60 Hz	Sockets in older buildings are often unearthed and accept only Type A plugs. High-power appliances such as air conditioners and ovens may run on 220 V via split-phase.
Tajikistan	C, F, I		220/380 V	50 Hz	
Tanzania	D, G		230/400 V	50 Hz	
Thailand	A, B, C, O	TISS 166-2549	230/400 V	50 Hz	Hybrid A/B/C sockets are most common; in addition to American (A, B) and Europlugs (C) they also accept the newly introduced Thai plug (O). Belgian/French and Schuko plugs (E, F) also fit, but no earth contact is established, hence the sale of appliances with E or F plugs has been banned.
Timor-Leste (East Timor)	C, E, F, I		220/380 V	50 Hz	
Togo	C, E		220/380 V	50 Hz	
Tonga	I	AS/NZS 3112	230/400 V	50 Hz	
Trinidad and Tobago	A, B		115/230 V 230/400 V	60 Hz	
Tunisia	C, E		230/400 V	50 Hz	
Turkey	C, F		230/400 V	50 Hz	
Turkmenistan	B, C, F		220/380 V	50 Hz	
Tuvalu	I	AS/NZS 3112	230/400 V	50 Hz	
Uganda	G		240/415 V	50 Hz	
Ukraine	C, F		230/400 V	50 Hz	
United Arab Emirates	G	BS 1363	230/400 V	50 Hz	Bathrooms may have shaver supply units.
United Kingdom	G, D, M	BS 1363; BS 546	230/400 V	50 Hz	Type D mostly historical, nowadays used only for remotely switched lighting and similar. Type M historically used in domestic installations, now only for stage lighting (where they are increasingly replaced with Ceeform). Bathrooms may have shaver supply units.
United States	A, B NEMA 14-30; NEMA 14-50	NEMA 1-15; NEMA 5-15; NEMA 14-30; NEMA 14-50	120/240 V 120/208 V 277/480 V	60 Hz	NEMA 5-20R outlets, which are similar to Type B but have a T-shaped neutral slot, are sometimes used for higher current 120 V equipment (up to 20 A). Homes are typically provided with 120/240 V split-phase power; NEMA 14-30R and 14-50R receptacles are provided on 240 V circuits for clothes dryers and electric stoves.
US Virgin Islands	A, B	NEMA 1-15P; NEMA 5-15P	110 V 190 V	60 Hz	
Uruguay	C, F, I, L		230/400 V	50 Hz	Type I was the main standard until the 1990s, and still appears in old installations.
Uzbekistan	C, E, F		220/380 V	50 Hz	
Vanuatu	I	AS/NZS 3112	230/400 V	50 Hz	
Venezuela	A, B		120/208 V 120/240 V	60 Hz	Both 120/208 V three-phase and 120/240 V split-phase are used.
Vietnam	A, B, C, F	TCVN 6188-1	220/380 V	50 Hz	Most households use unearthed hybrid sockets that accept Type A and C plugs. Hybrid sockets that accept Type A, B, and C plugs are sometimes used in commercial installations. Type F plugs are frequently plugged into hybrid sockets, though this is somewhat unsafe, as no earth contact is made.
Yemen	A, D, G		240/400 V	50 Hz	
Zambia	C, D, G		230/400 V	50 Hz	
Zimbabwe	D, G		220/380 V	50 Hz	

== See also ==
- Electrical wiring
- Electric power transmission
- Electrification
- Electrical grid
- List of railway electrification systems
- Mains electricity
