= IEC 60038 =

Set of standard voltages

International Standard IEC 60038, IEC standard voltages, defines a set of standard nominal electricity supply voltages for low voltage and high voltage AC and DC systems.

== Tables ==
The standard primarily contains a set of tables, each of which define a set of standard nominal supply voltages that may be chosen from, as follows:

- Table 1 defines those for AC systems where voltage is to be within the range 100 to 1000.
- Table 2 defines those for DC and AC traction systems, and provides DC options from 400 to 3600, and AC options from 4750 to 27500.
- Table 3 defines those for three-phase AC systems where voltage is to be within the range 1kV to 35kV.
- Table 4 defines those for three-phase AC systems where voltage is to be within the range 35kV to 230kV.
- Table 5 defines those for three-phase AC systems where voltage is to exceed 230kV, and gives options up to 1200kV.
- Table 6 defines nominal voltages for equipment below 120 V AC, or 750 V DC.

== Low voltage systems (Table 1) ==
Standard nominal voltages that can be used for low voltage systems in the 100-1000V range are as follows:

- For three-phase 3 or 4-wire systems at 50 Hz:
  - 230 V (3-wire)
  - 230/400 V
  - 400/690 V
  - 1000 V (3-wire)
- For three-phase 3 or 4-wire systems at 60 Hz:
  - 120/208 V
  - 240 V (3-wire)
  - 230/400 V
  - 277/480 V
  - 480 V (3-wire)
  - 347/600 V
  - 600 V (3-wire)
- For single-phase 3-wire systems at 60 Hz (American split-phase):
  - 120/240 V

Note that with the exception of the American split-phase case, where two voltages are given separated by a slash, these represent 4-wire cases; the first voltage corresponding to that between phase and neutral, and the second between phases. Single voltage values are for 3-wire cases and thus correspond to that between phases. In the case of American split-phase, the first value is that between a hot and the centre-tapped neutral, while the second is that between the pair of hots. All AC voltages are RMS. Three-phase 3-wire is without neutral, while three-phase 4-wire is with neutral.

Of historical interest, it is noted that the 230/400 V three-phase option replaced the former 220/380 V and 240/415 V systems. Similarly the 380/660 V system was replaced with 400/690 V. Migration from these older voltage systems was required by amendment 1 to the 1983 edition of the standard, published in 1994. Those countries with a 220/380 V systems were required to bring their voltage within +6/-10% of 230/400 V, while those with a 240/415 V system were required to bring their voltage within +10/-6% of 230/400 V, as soon as possible, and no later than the year 2003, thus achieving all systems being within ±10% of 230/400 V by that deadline.

== See also ==
- Mains electricity by country
