= IEC 60906-1 =

International AC power plug standard

IEC 60906-1 plug

IEC 60906-1 is an international standard for AC power plugs and sockets. The standard was originally published by the International Electrotechnical Commission (IEC) in 1986 and is designated as "Type N"; the current edition is ed2.0 published in 2009.

It was designed "to provide a standard for a safe, compact and practical 16 A 250 V AC system of plugs and socket-outlets that could be accepted by many countries as their national standard, even if not in the near future." Although it is almost identical to the Swiss "Type J" SN 441011 T12 plug for 10 A 250 V a.c. standardized in 1937, its dimensions are slightly different and its polarization is flipped. (If the IEC 60906-1 socket has the protective/earth conductor at the top, the live conductor is on the right and the neutral one is on the left.)

As of March 2025, only South Africa and Paraguay have introduced standards based closely on IEC 60906-1, and only in South Africa the installation of sockets of this type has become mandatory. Brazil used it as the basis for its NBR 14136 standard, but this is not fully compatible with IEC 60906-1. In 2017, an analysis published by the European Union (EU) did not recommend the harmonization of domestic plug and socket systems in the EU, arguing that the existing systems are already reasonably safe and that a harmonization would cause huge costs and unnecessary electric waste.

== Features ==
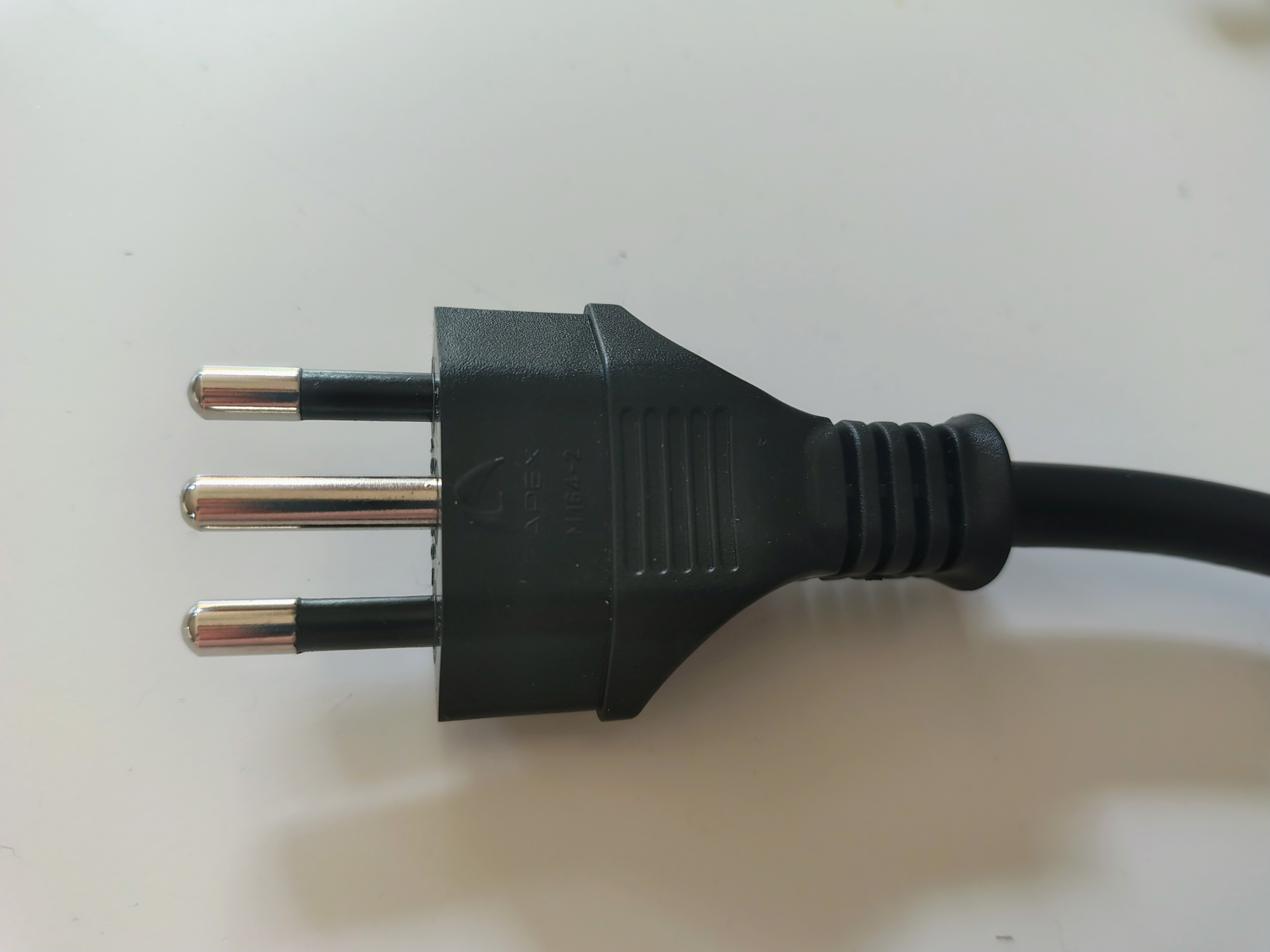
SANS 164–2 three-pin plug, fully compliant with the international IEC 60906-1 standard

IEC 60906-1 plugs and socket-outlets are rated 16 A, 250 V AC and are intended for use on distribution systems having nominal voltages between 200 V and 250 V AC. IEC 60906-1 defines both 3-pin connectors for class I appliances and 2-pin versions for class II appliances. (Additional oval-shaped 2-pin connectors for class 0 appliances defined in the first edition of the standard were never implemented and no longer appear in the current second edition.)

The IEC 60906-1 plugs are smaller than any other European plug with 16 A rating, being only slightly larger than the 2.5 A Europlug and providing much more reliable contact. The sockets are small enough that two can be installed in the space taken by a single Schuko or BS 1363 socket.

The socket has either a 10 mm deep recess or a 12 mm high rim, to exclude incompatible plugs. It ensures that the protective-earth pin establishes contact before the live and neutral pins. Sockets are required to have shutters for the live and neutral apertures.

As it uses the same 19 mm pin spacing as most existing European systems (Schuko, etc.), it would be possible to design sockets that can accept both the traditional plug as well as the IEC 60906-1 Class I and II plugs, thereby enabling a smooth transition to the new system. However, the IEC 60906-1 standard explicitly discourages the use of multi-standard sockets, claiming that such sockets are likely to create safety problems when used with plugs from other countries.

== Dimensions ==
IEC 60906-1 plugs are similar in size and shape to the Europlug, with the front profile being a flat hexagon. They are 35.5 mm wide. The 3-pin Class I plug is 17 mm high, whereas the 2-pin Class II plug is 14 mm high (similar to the Europlug). The parallel side faces are 26 mm apart, and the two pairs of side faces are orthogonal to each other. Like Schuko and Europlug, the live and neutral pin are 19 mm long and on centres spaced at 19 mm. The pins have a diameter of 4.5 mm, intermediate between Schuko (⌀4.8 mm) and Europlug (⌀4.0 mm). In common with the Europlug there is an insulating sleeve around the base of the live and neutral pins. The 3-pin version has a round protective-earth pin of the same length and diameter as the live and neutral pins, but with no insulating sleeve. The protective-earth pin's centre is offset 3 mm from the centre point between the live and neutral pin.

== Adoptors ==
=== South African SANS 164-2 standard ===
South Africa was the first only country to have incorporated IEC 60906-1 plugs and sockets into its own national standards, as SANS 164–2. SANS 164-2 was made the preferred standard in 2013, replacing the older SANS 164-1 (based on BS 546) but according to the South African Bureau of Standards (SABS) electrotechnical standards development manager, the new plugs and sockets would have "a long, long phase-in period, more than 20 years".

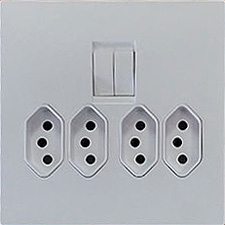
South African SANS 164–2, quadruple socket

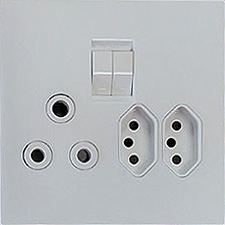
South African SANS 164-1 (old) & SANS 164-2 (new) sockets in a single plate

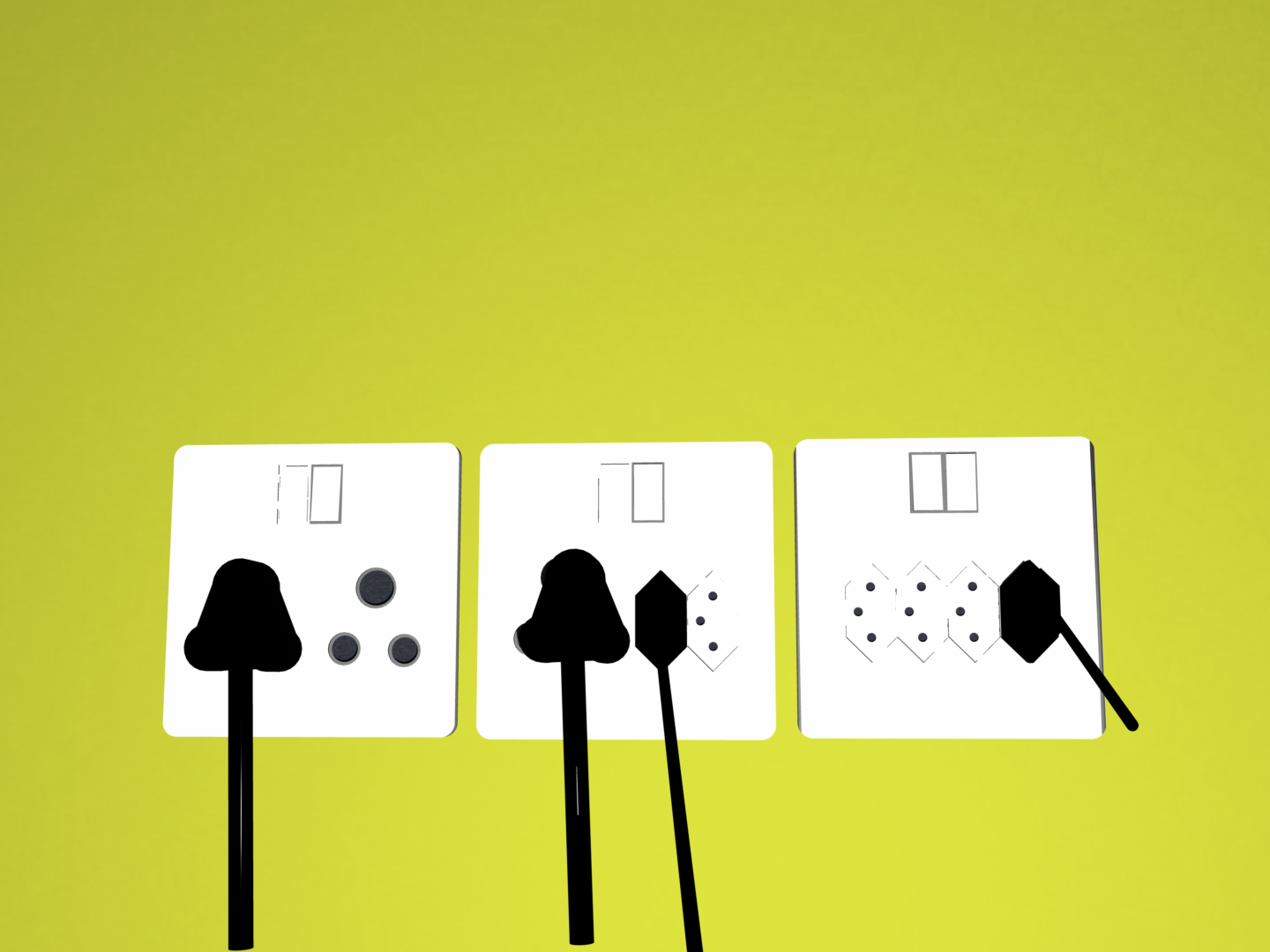
Left: Old outlet and plug, Middle: Old and new (multi-standard socket), Right: Socket for new plugs only

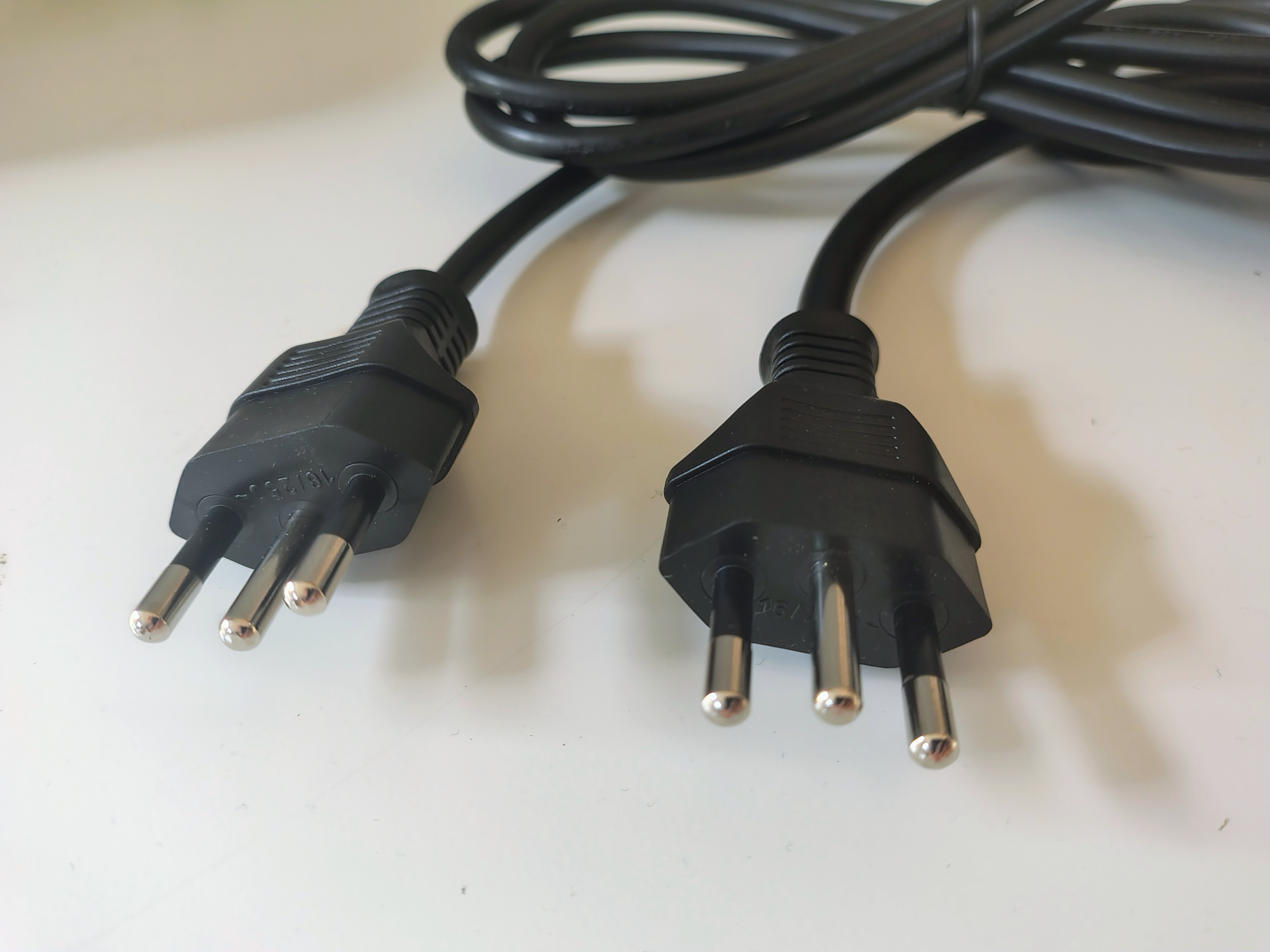
Two SANS 164–2 plugs

=== Brazilian NBR 14136 standard ===
According to the National Institute of Metrology Standardization and Industrial Quality in Brazil, the Brazilian Association of Technical Standards "began discussing the creation of a standard for plugs and sockets ... in the 1980s, based on the draft international standard based on IEC 60906-01. It was concluded with wide participation of the manufacturers of plugs and sockets and of electrical and electronic equipment, in July of 1998, with the publication of the norm ABNT NBR 14136."

There are a number of non-compliance issues with IEC 60906-1. Brazil uses both 127 V and 220 V mains supplies, and in many cases these are available in the same city and even the same household; so rather than using the IEC 60906-2 standard for the lower voltage it uses NBR 14136 for both, as many devices in Brazil support both 127 V and 220 V, either automatically or via toggling a switch. Whereas IEC 60906-1 specifies a single 16 A rating with 4.5 mm pins, NBR 14136 has both 10 A and 20 A ratings, the 10 A plug has a pin diameter of 4 mm, and the 20 A plug is 4.8 mm. NBR 14136 does not require shutters on the apertures, a further noncompliance with IEC 60906-1. The 10 A socket will accept only 10 A plugs, and Europlugs, while the 20 A socket will accept both 10 A and 20 A plugs, plus Europlugs.

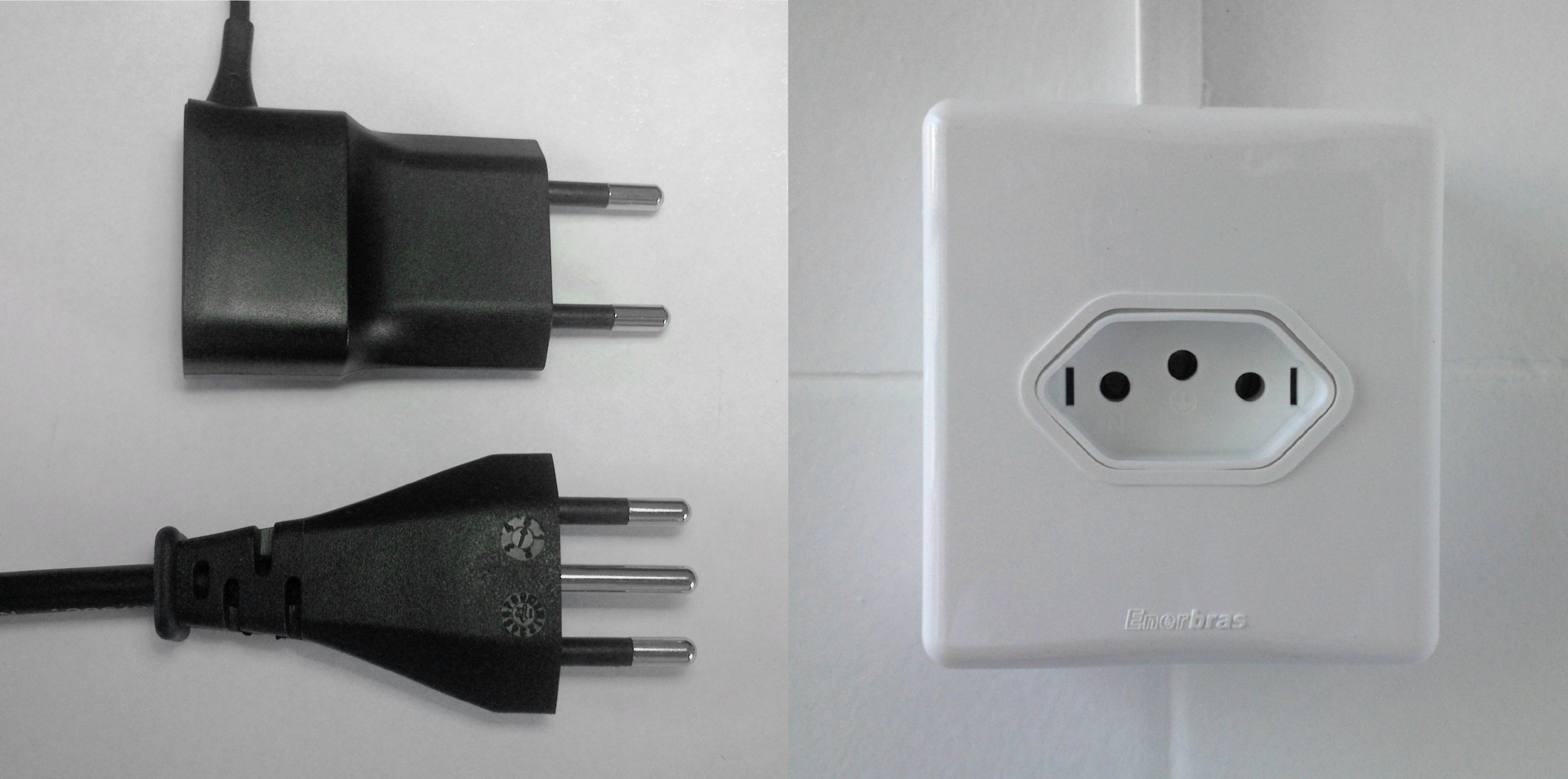
Two-pin charger, three-pin 10 A plug and 10 A socket-outlet conforming to Brazilian Standard NBR 14136.

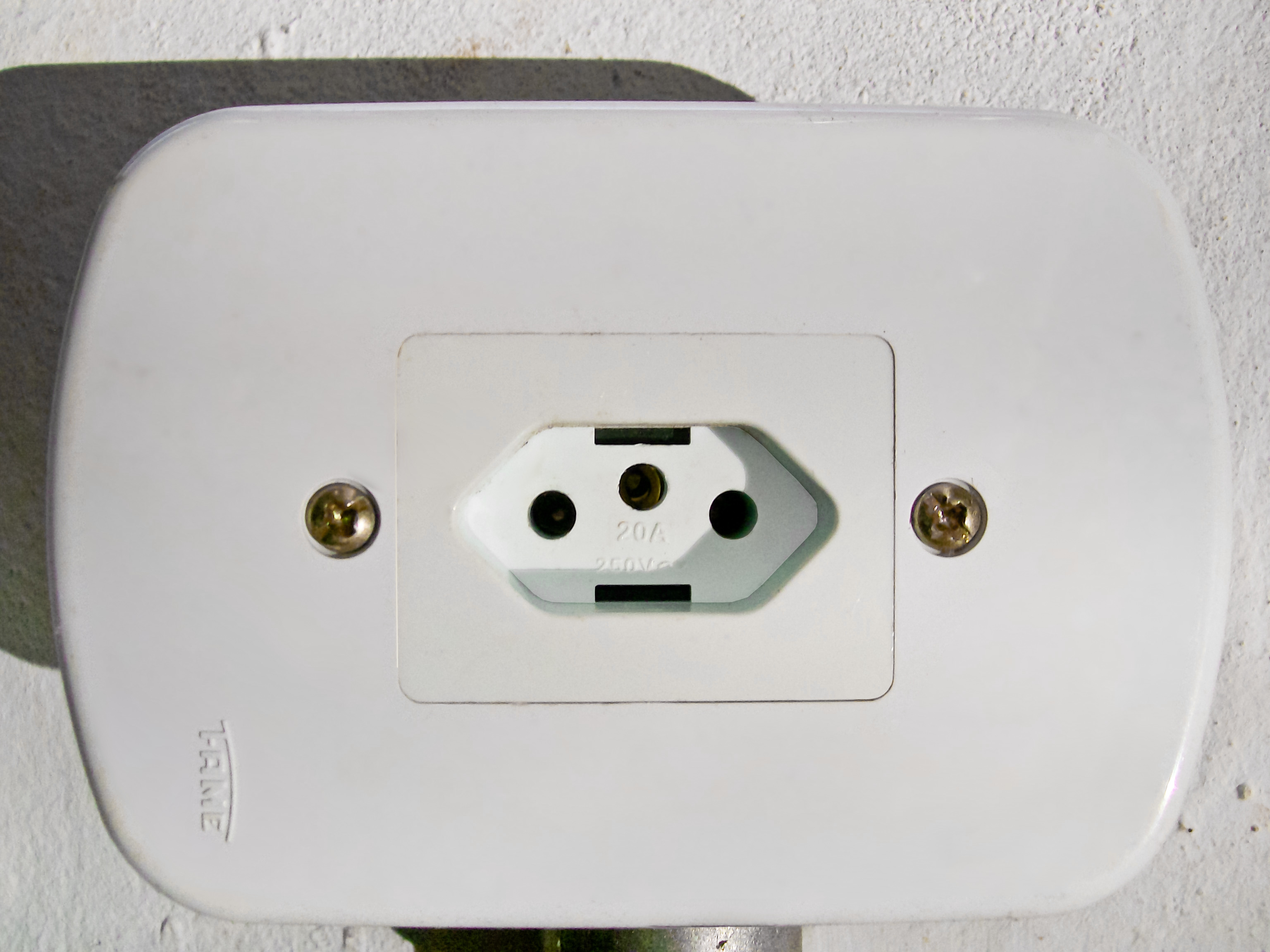
A 20 A Brazilian socket based on the IEC 60906-1 standard.

Diagram of the a Brazilian NBR 14136 plug with insulated pins.

=== Paraguay ===
In November 2022, the National Institute of Technology, Standardization, and Metrology (INTN) of Paraguay adopted the IEC standard as national standard PNA-IEC 60906-1. Initially its application is voluntary, but it is planned to make it mandatory at some point in the future. Like South Africa, Paraguay adopted the IEC standard without any changes, hence there is only one size of sockets and plugs rated for 16 A and sockets must have shutters for the live and neutral pins.

As of March 2025, there is no indication that sockets of this type are commonly installed in Paraguay.

=== Possibility of acceptance in European Union ===
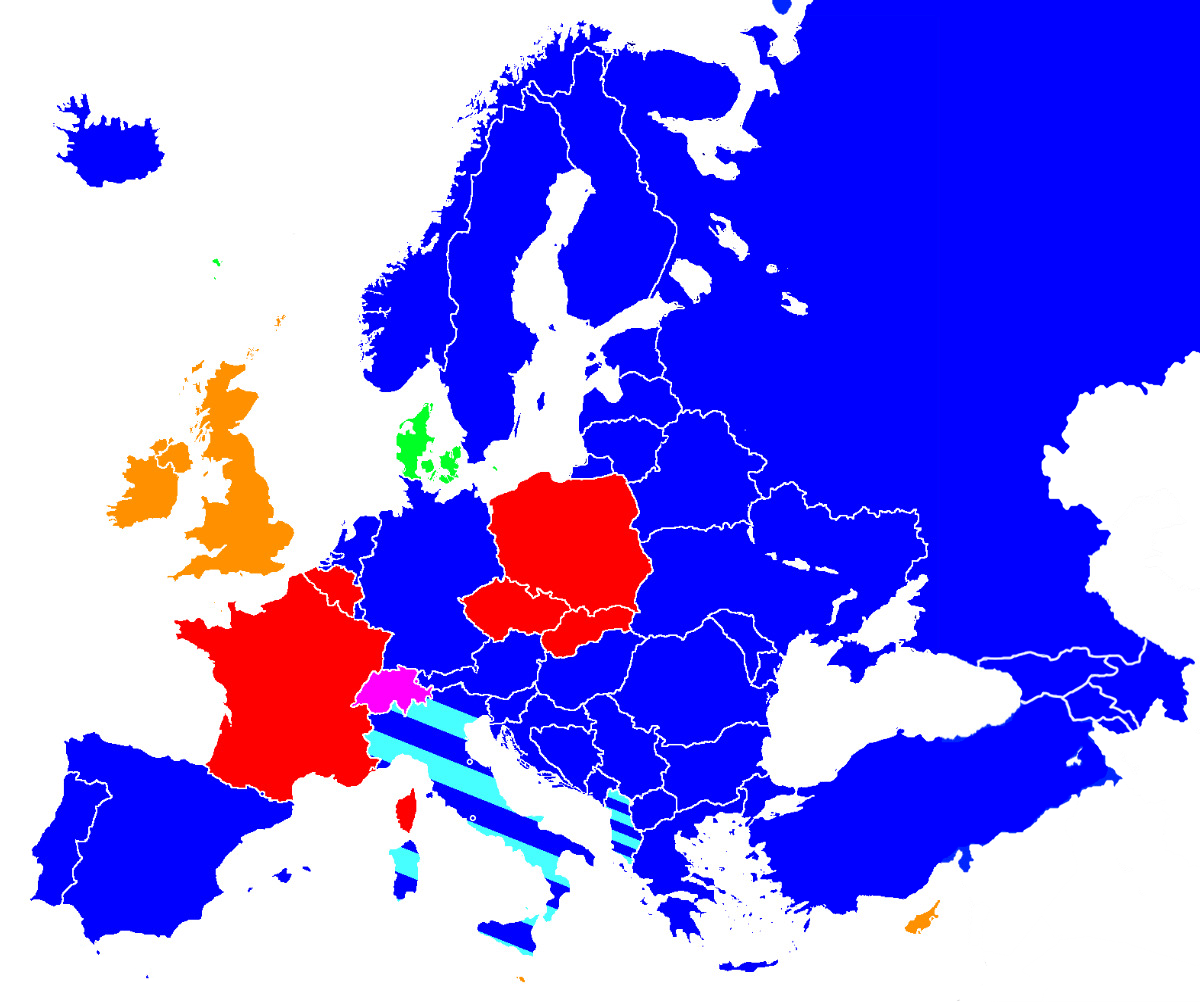
Currently used AC mains plugs in Europe. Schuko (Type F, CEE 7/4 plug, CEE 7/7 plug) French (Type E, CEE 7/6 plug, CEE 7/7 plug) British (Type G, BS 1363) Swiss (Type J, SN 441011) Danish 107-2-D1 (Type K) Italian CEI 23-50 (Type L)

In the 1990s the EU requested the European Committee for Electrotechnical Standardization (CENELEC) to devise a harmonized plug and socket system for Europe. In 1995 that attempt was abandoned as CENELEC delegates could not agree an acceptable solution, and CENELEC forecast that converting European households, offices and factories to a common standard would cost about $125 billion.

In response to a suggestion that the European Commission introduce a common system across the whole of the EU, the commission's Regulatory Fitness and Performance (REFIT) programme issued recommendations in 2017. REFIT found that "the harmonisation of plug and socket outlet systems in Europe, by introducing changes in national wiring legislations (would have) important transitional periods (above 75 years)", and that the cost to "replace the old socket-outlets (and the corresponding plugs of the appliances being used)" was estimated at €100 billion, "generating a huge environmental impact, producing some 700000 tons of electrical waste". REFIT does not recommend harmonizing the plugs and socket-outlet systems in Europe.

== Comparison with traditional systems ==
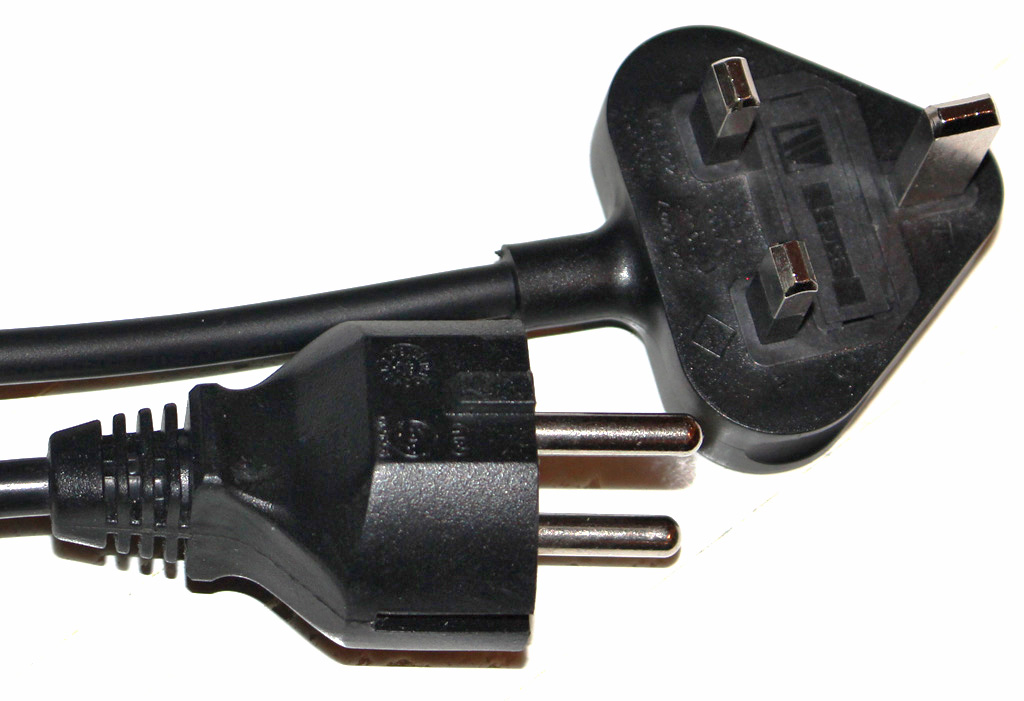
BS 1363 (upper) & Schuko (lower) plugs – both much larger than IEC 60906-1 plugs

Modern injection moulding technology enables robust and safe plugs to be smaller than the Schuko and BS 1363 systems, which were designed in the early- and mid-20th century respectively.

=== BS 1363 ===
The IEC 60906-1 and BS 1363 systems have some common safety features in that plugs and sockets are polarised, and that sockets are required to have shutters for the live and neutral pins. The IEC 60906-1 plugs are rated for up to 16 amperes, while the BS 1363 plugs—which are larger—are rated for 13 amperes. The unfused IEC 60906-1 is incompatible with UK law which requires an appropriately-rated fuse in the plug to protect the attached flexible cord.

=== Schuko ===
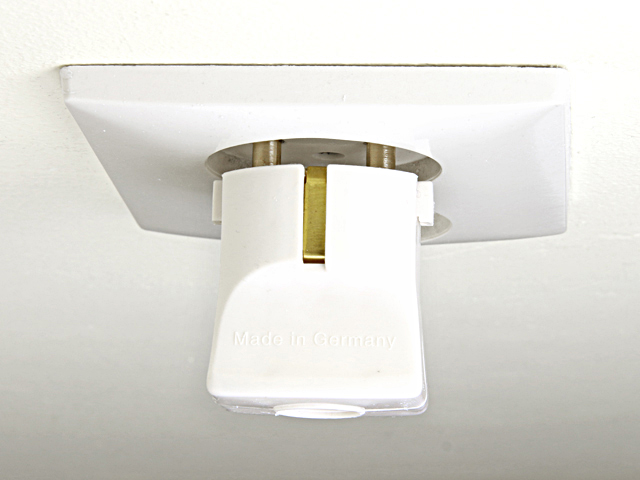
Schuko plug partially inserted into a CEE 7/1 unearthed socket. The live pins are in contact while exposed. There is no connection for the earthing contact.

The IEC 60906-1 system also has advantages over the Schuko and French systems currently used in most of Europe and large parts of Asia:

- The Schuko plug is larger; its face going into the socket has approximately twice the area of the IEC 60906-1 plugs (ca. 10 cm^{2} for the Schuko vs. ca. 4.6 cm^{2} for the earthed IEC 60906-1 plug and 3.8 cm^{2} for the non-earthed IEC 60906-1 plug).
- Shock hazard can occur due to mateability of the Class I (earthed) equipment with Schuko plugs being inserted into commonly used two pin (unearthed) sockets that lack protective-earth contacts. This can for instance be the case with the CEE 7/1 unearthed socket, which has been or is currently being phased out in most countries, as well as with sockets that remain standard in some countries such as Denmark, India, Israel, and Thailand.

The French system (Type E) shares both these problems.

Socket forms from SN 441011
	Single phase, Earthed	Three-phase, Earthed
10 A	Type 13	Type 15
16 A	Type 23	Type 25

=== Swiss plug ===
The earthed IEC 60906-1 plug (IEC designation "Type N") looks similar to the Swiss SN 441011 type 12 plug (IEC designation "Type J") designed in 1937. However, the latter has smaller diameter pins (4.0 mm), the earth pin is offset more (5 mm), it is only rated for 10 A and the polarization is flipped. Therefore, there is no compatibility between these earthed 3-pin plugs.

The two types of plug systems also differ in that IEC 60906-1 plugs (both 2 pin unearthed and 3 pin earthed) always have been defined to have partially sleeved live and neutral pins, while the Swiss type 11 (unearthed) and type 12 (earthed) plugs formerly were allowed to be without partially sleeved pins. However, since 2013, only type 11 and 12 plugs with partially sleeved live and neutral pins are allowed to be imported and distributed in Switzerland to reduce the risk of electrical shocks.

=== Italian plug ===
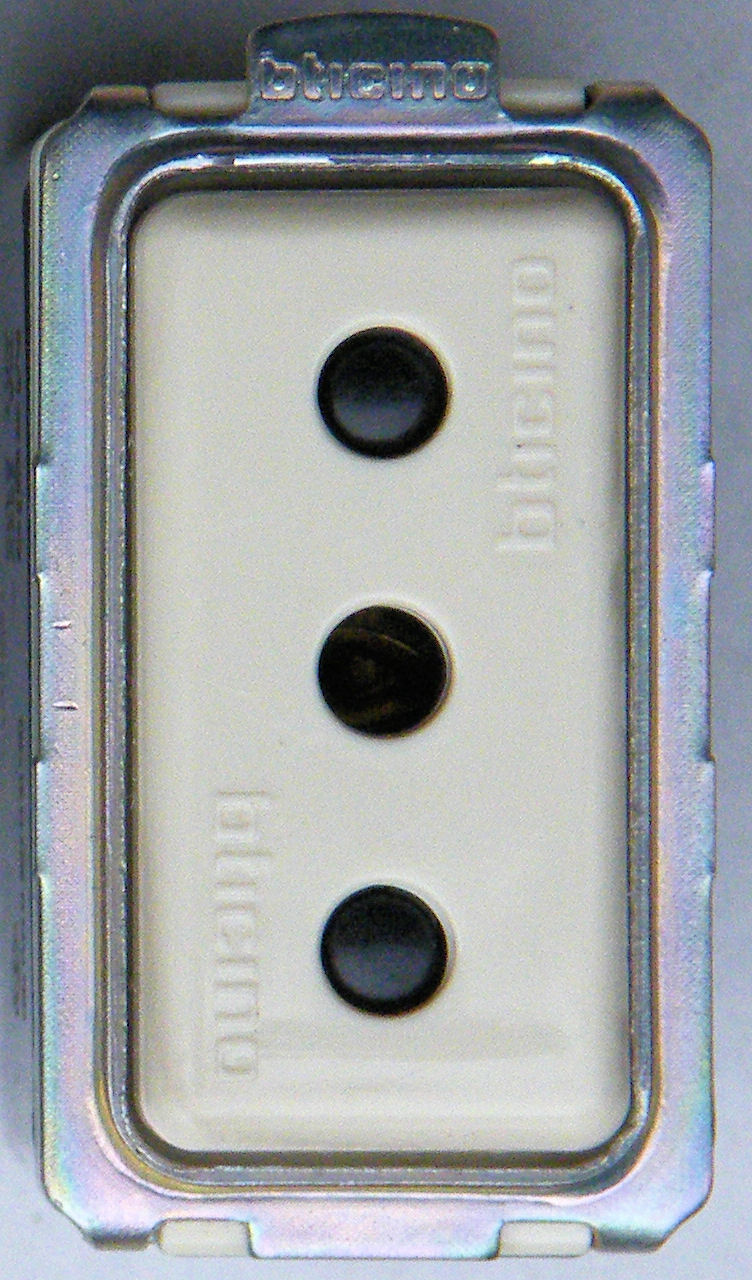
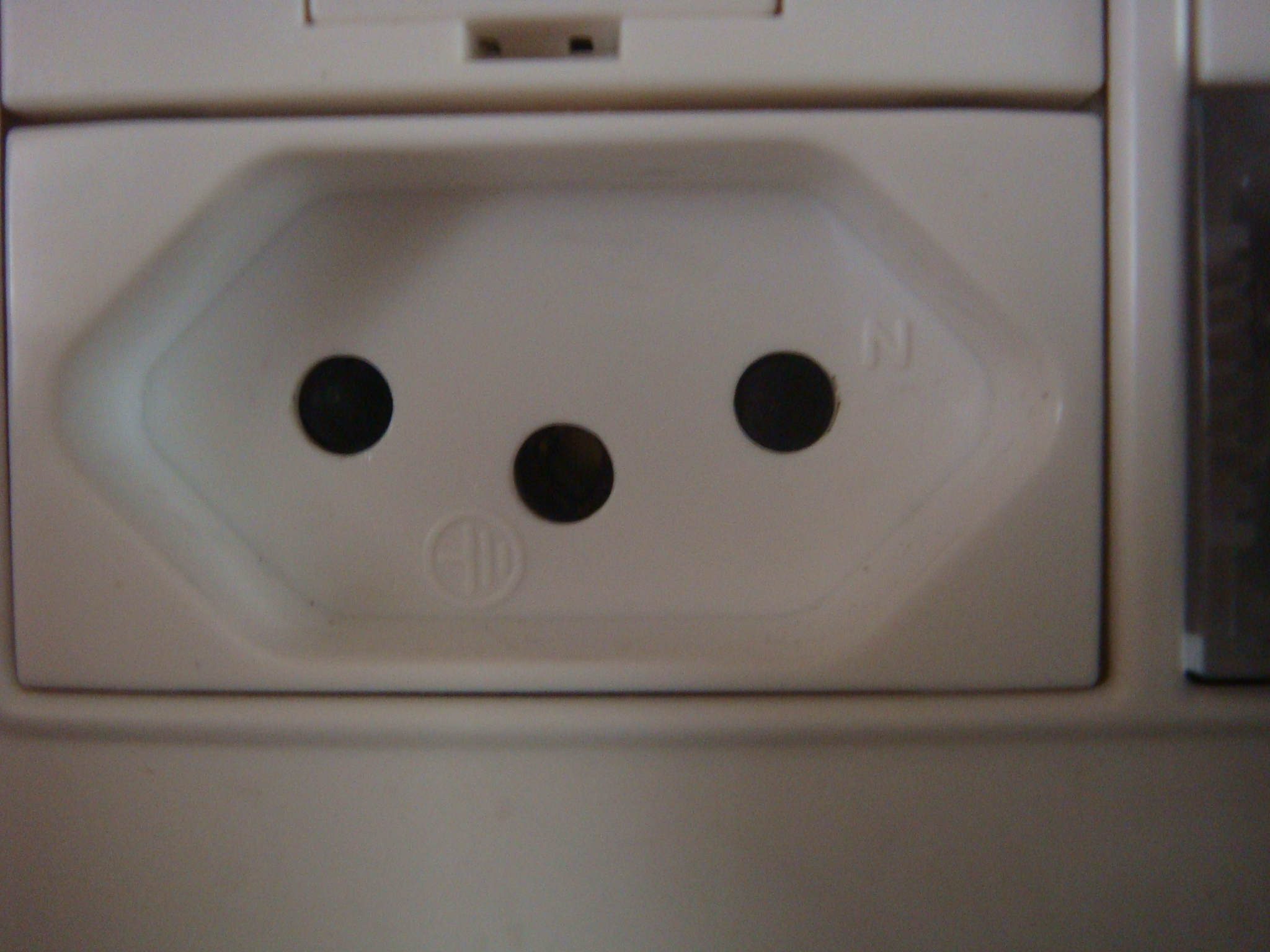
Side by side comparison of a reversible Italian CEI 23-50 10 A socket (left) and a non-reversible NBR 14136 10 A socket (right).

The IEC 60906-1 is similar to the Italian plug CEI 23-50 10 A ("Type L"), with the same front profile shaped as a flat hexagon and the same position of the live and neutral pins (the centres spaced 19 mm apart). However, the pins of the Type L 10 A are 4 mm in diameter (as in the Europlug) and the earth pin is aligned with the two others (no offset is present), making the Italian plug unpolarised. Moreover, the Italian plug is rated for up to 10 amperes (although a 16-ampere version exists with different and incompatible size), while the IEC 60906-1 plugs are rated for 16 amperes.

== See also ==
- AC power plugs and sockets
- Europlug
- DC connector § IEC 60906-3:1994
