= SN 441011 =

Swiss standard for AC power plugs and sockets

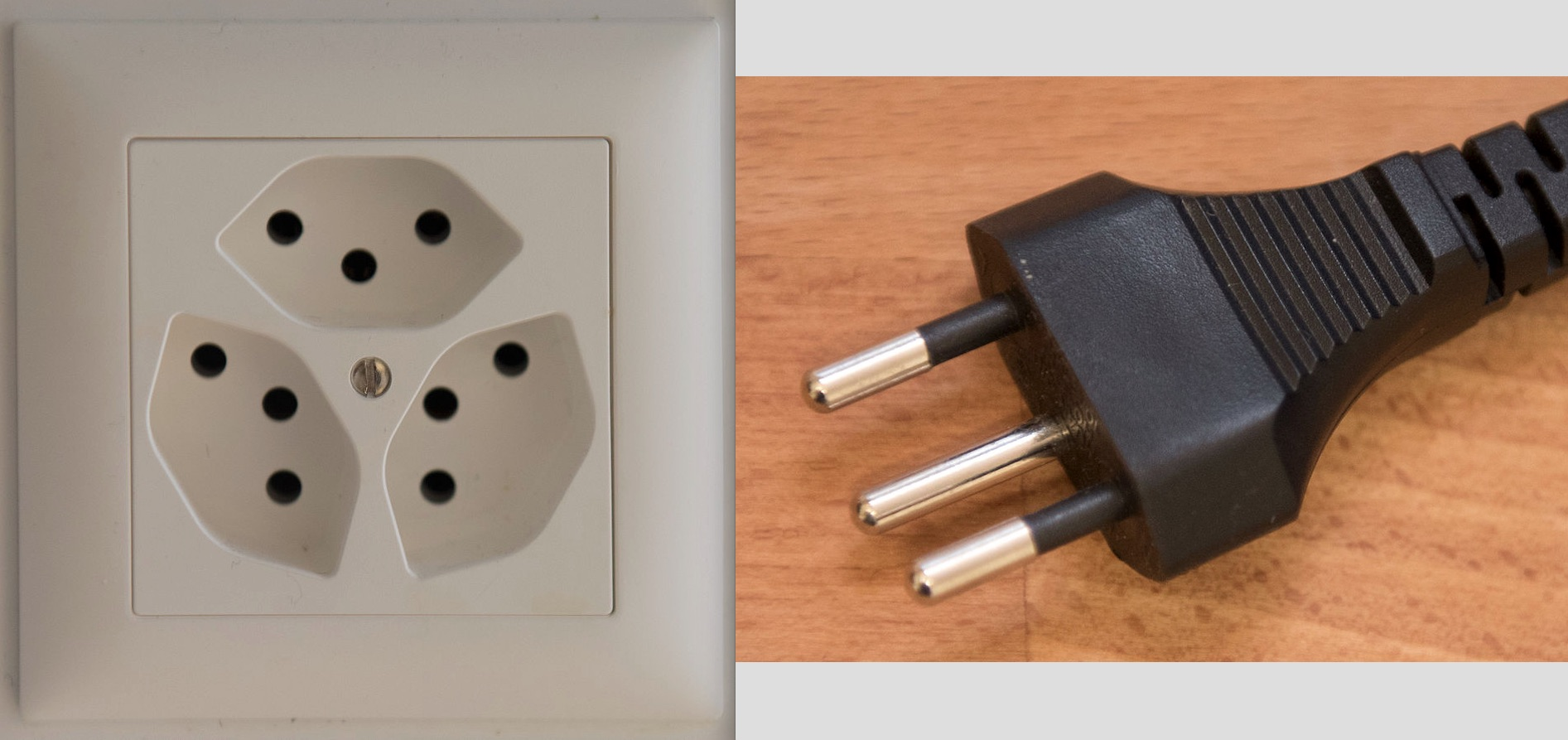
Type J: The 10 ampere SN 441011 type 13 socket (here: a triple socket) and type 12 plug

SN 441011, until 2019 SEV 1011, is the Swiss national standard for AC power plug for domestic use and similar purposes. The plug SN 441011 Type 12 and the socket SN 441011 Type 13 are also designated internationally as Type J, and the Europlug fits in all Swiss sockets. As well as Switzerland, these sockets are used in Liechtenstein.

== Details ==
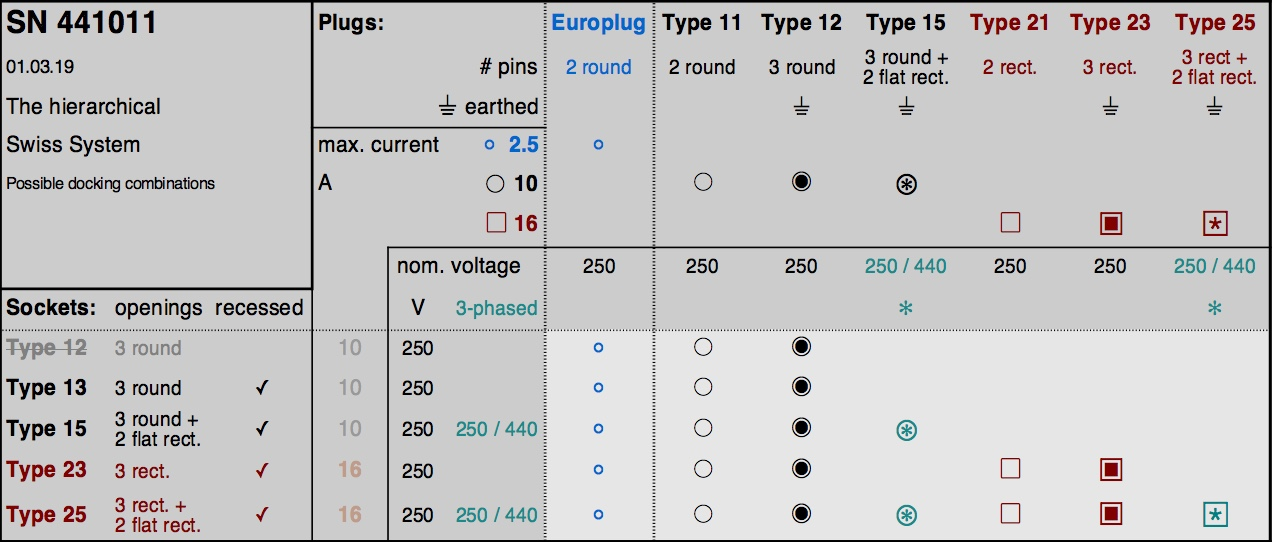
SN 441011, overview of the hierarchical Swiss System

The plug-in system defined in the standard for 250 V / 440 V alternating voltage at 50 Hz is structured to be “hierarchically downward compatible”. This means that sockets designed for 16 amps also accept plugs for 10 amps, but not the other way around, and that 2- or 3-pole (single-phase) plugs can also be used with 5-pole (three-phase) sockets. The Euro plug (2.5 A) also fits into all 4 socket types.

Polarization of the T13 socket. Blue (left): neutral conductor. Green-yellow (middle): protective conductor. Brown (right): phase conductor.

In all versions with three or five contact pins (Types 12/13, 15, 23 and 25) the middle pole is the protective contact. Although the contact pins are of the same length, the protective contact is in advance because the sockets for the neutral conductor and phase conductor(s) are sunk deeper in the socket. The offset arrangement of the contacts ensures reverse polarity protection (with a socket, the phase conductor is on the right and the protective conductor is at the bottom). All new sockets are equipped with protective collars. Sockets without protective collars were allowed outside of wet rooms until 2016, but existing sockets of this type can continue to be operated.

== History ==
The Swiss standard was first described in SEV 1011 (ASE1011/1959 SW10A-R). On 4 December 2009, the TK23 Technical Committee issued the new revised edition of the Swiss standard SEV 1011:2009 for 10-A plugs and 11/12 sockets to provide, among other things, improved protection against contact with partially insulated pins can. As of 1 January 2013, imports into Switzerland of Type 11 and Type 12 plugs are only permitted with partially insulated plug pins. After the year 2016, only sockets type 13 with a recessed socket hole may be brought onto the market.

From the Type 12 proposed in 1937 and introduced in 1953, the international standard IEC 60906-1 was derived in 1986, on which only the national standards of Brazil (NBR 14136 or Type N) and South Africa (SANS 164-2) are based. Despite the great similarity, these are not compatible with SN 441011, as the polarity has been reversed in IEC 60906-1 and the earthing contact is only 3 mm offset from the center line instead of 5 mm. (A combined socket, which accepts both plugs according to SN 441011 and IEC 60906-1, would, however, be easy to implement, since a further hole for the earthing contact with the smaller distance would only have to be added opposite the previous central hole.) The hexagonal shape of the Euro plug (2.5 A) is also derived from the Swiss standard. This differs only slightly from the connector Type 11 (10 A).

== Types ==
=== Sockets ===
Socket forms from SN 441011
	Single phase, Earthed	Three-phase, Earthed
10 A	Type 13	Type 15
16 A	Type 23	Type 25

Other Swiss socket forms

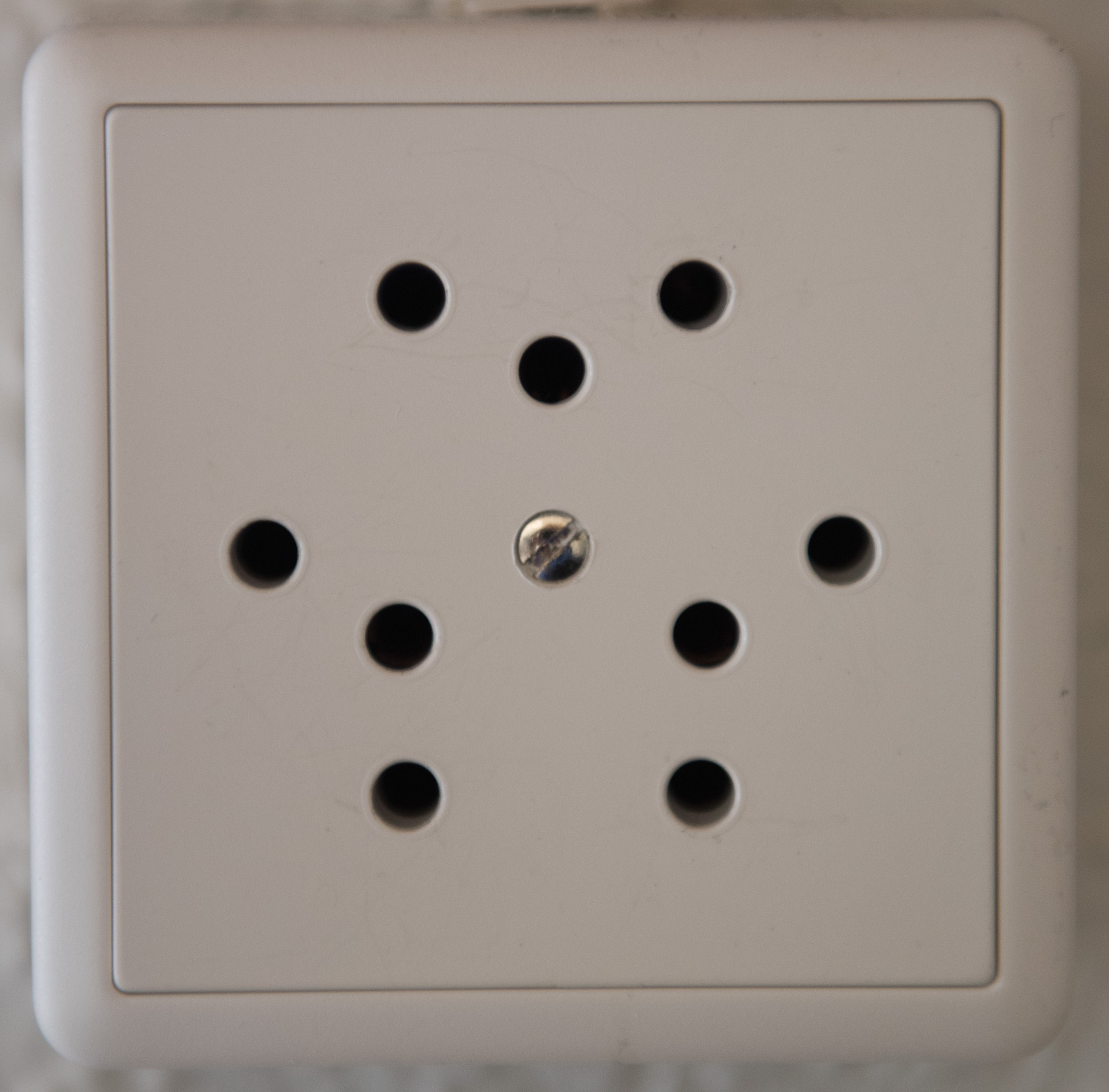
Type 12 triple socket (10 A), now obsolete and no longer sold or installed

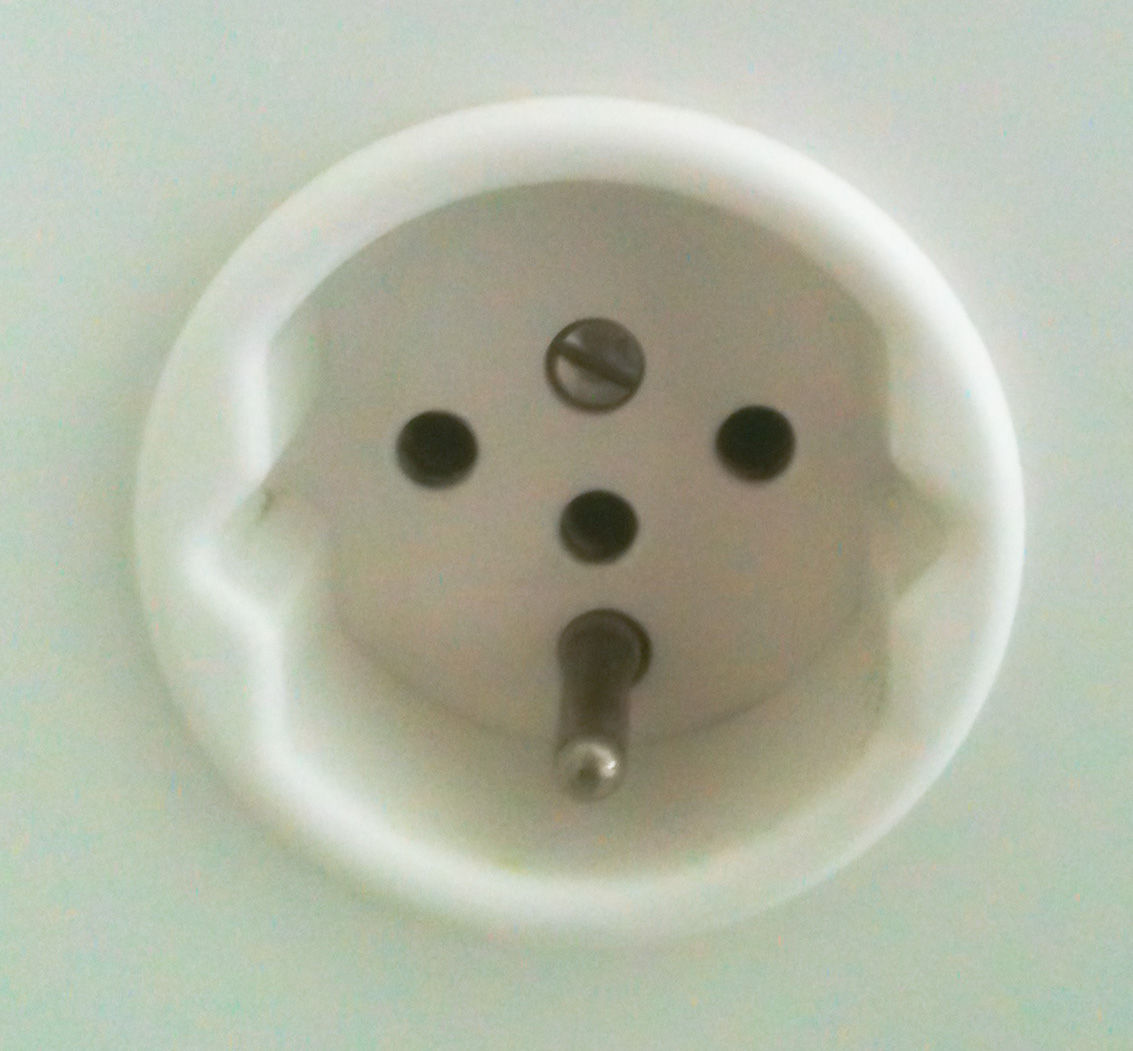
Type 14 single socket (10 A), now obsolete

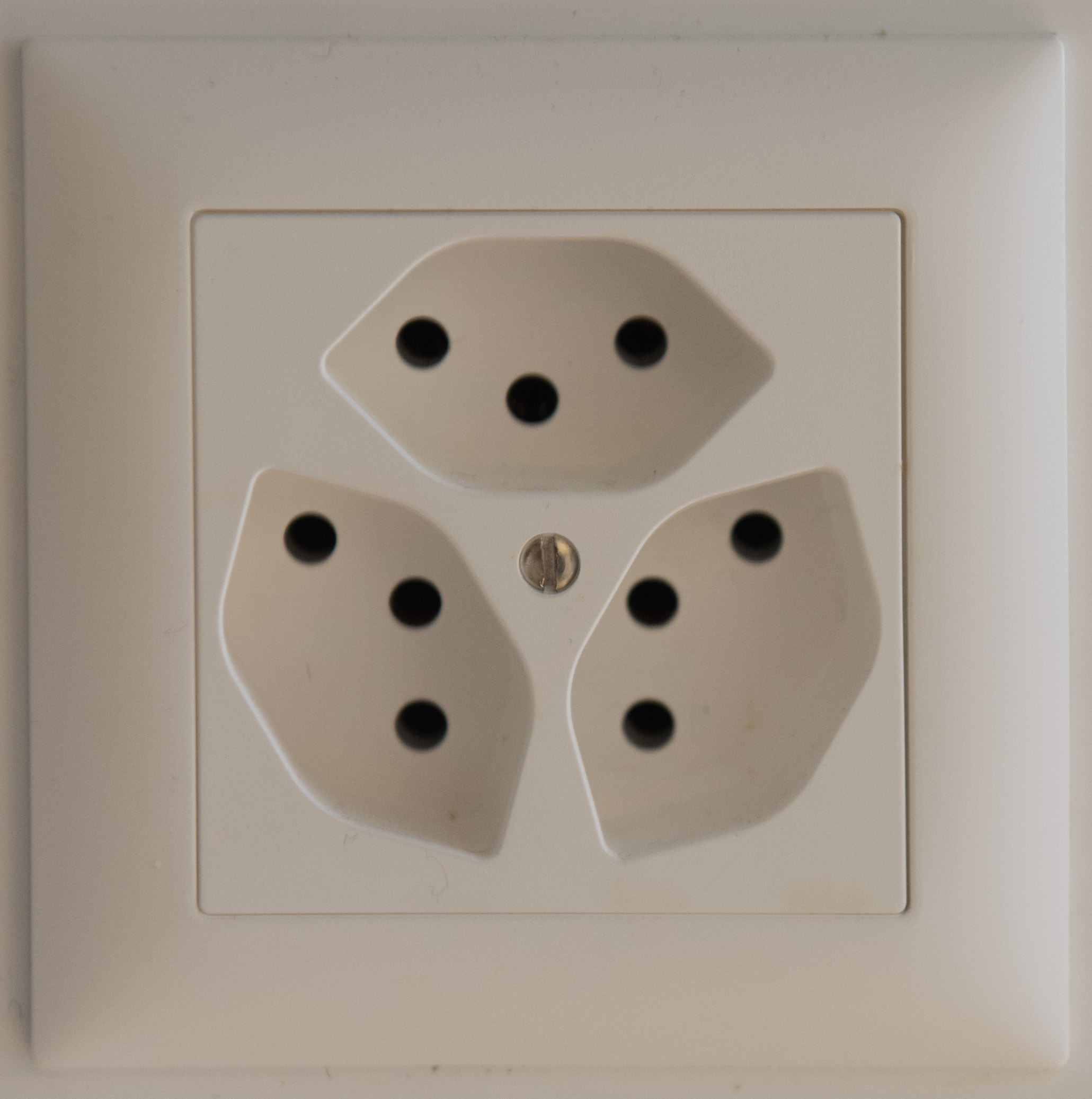
Type 13 triple socket (10 A)

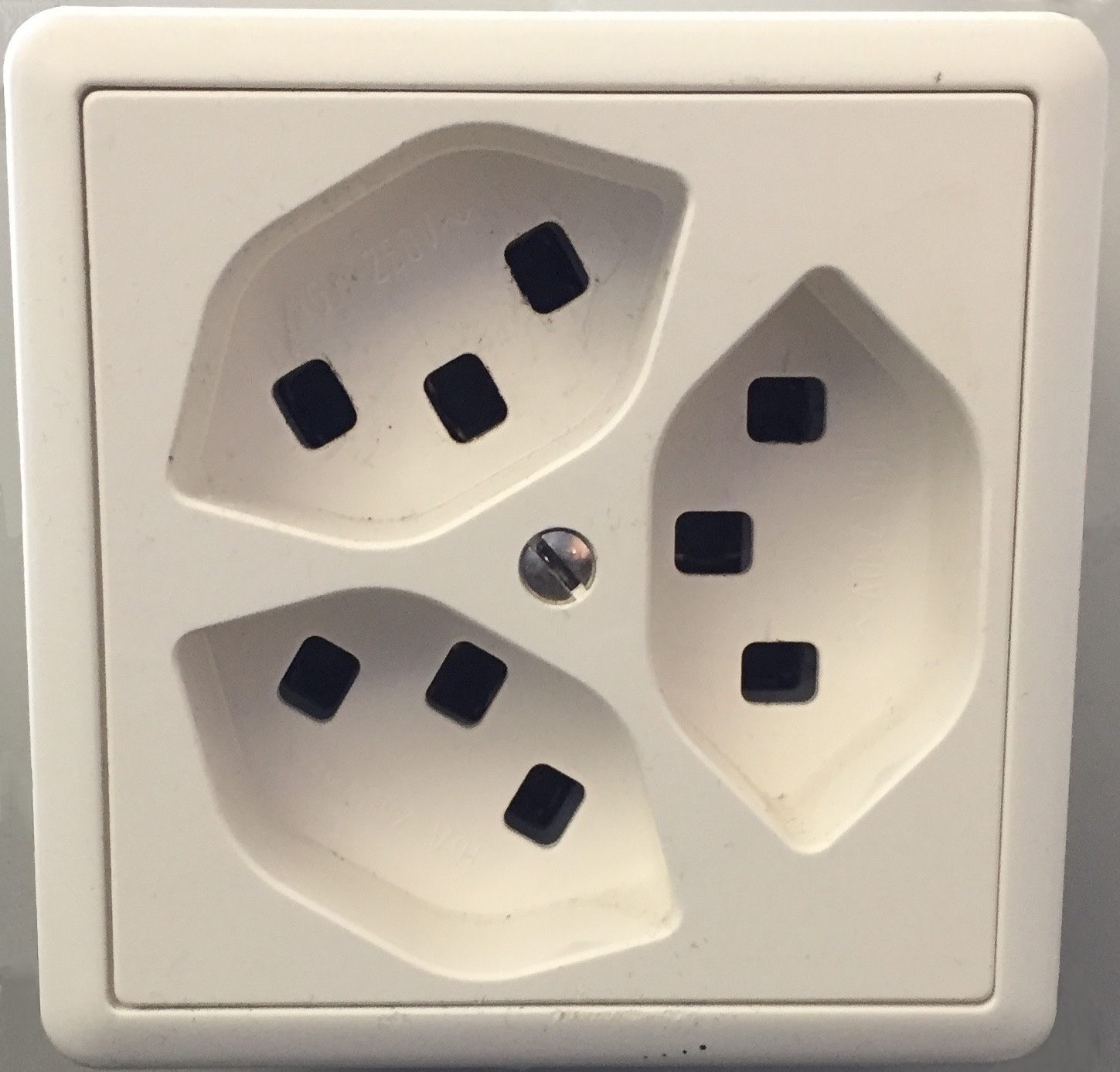
Type 23 triple socket (16 A)

=== Plugs ===
Plug forms from SN 441011
	Single phase, Live & Neutral	Single phase, Earthed, Live, & Neutral	Three-phase, Earthed, 3 × Live, & Neutral	Cross section of the contact pins
2.5 A	Europlug			π × 2² ≈ 12,57 mm²
10 A	Type 11	Type 12	Type 15	π × 2² ≈ 12,57 mm²
16 A	Type 21	Type 23	Type 25	4 × 5 = 20 mm²

== Standard documents ==
The Swiss standard is described in SN 441011 "Plugs and sockets for household use and similar purposes", which contains the following standard sheets:

- SN 441011-1: Description of the systems with risk analysis and national deviations from the IEC 60884 series
- SN 441011-2-1: Standard sheets and construction specifications for plug-in devices with degrees of protection IP20 and IP55
- SN 441011-2-2: Multiple and intermediate adapters, extension cables, socket strips as well as travel and fixed adapters
- SN 441011-2-3: Advices

Products according to the outdated standard SEV 1011:2009 may only be manufactured or imported until 28 February 2022.

Until 2019, SEV 1011:2009 (ASE1011 / 1959 SW10A-R) was the relevant standard.

On 4 December 2009, the technical committee TK23 published the new, revised edition of the then standard SEV 1011:2009 for 10 A plugs and sockets of type 11/12 in order to offer, among other things, improved protection against contact with partially insulated connector pins can.

From 1 January 2013, the import of Type 11 and Type 12 plugs into Switzerland will only be permitted with partially insulated pins. After 2016, only Type 13 sockets with a recessed socket hole may be brought onto the market.

== Dimensions ==
Geometric construction of the outer shape of the T12 and the T23 plugs

Hexagonal shape
All single-phase connectors have a hexagonal shape. The left and right side of the connector are formed by surfaces that are at 45° relative to the horizontal plane.
Dimensions of the protective collar for sockets
Collars of sockets according to T11 and T21 are at least 16 mm (+1 mm) wide, those according to T13 and T23 at least 21 mm (+2 mm) wide. All collars of these types are at least 36.5 mm long. Those of three-phase sockets have a dimension of 37.2 (± 0.7) × 39.5 (± 1) mm.
Protective collar depth for sockets
With single-phase sockets (T11, T13, T21, T23) the protective collar is 13 mm (+5 mm) deep, with three-phase sockets (T15, T25) 17.5 mm (+1 mm) deep.
Dimensions of the connector
Ungrounded T11 and T21 plugs are between 13 mm and 14.5 mm wide, while grounded T12 and T23 plugs are between 17 mm and 20 mm wide. All these plugs are between 35 mm and 36 mm long. Three-phase plugs have a dimension of 35.4 (± 0.7) × 30 (± 0.7) mm.
Pin length of the connector
The pins are 19 mm (± 0.5 mm) long on all types. The length of the insulation on the connector pins is 8 mm (± 0.25 mm).
Diameter of the pins and the openings
The pins of the 10 A connector are 4 mm (± 0.06 mm) in diameter. The diameter of the openings in the sockets is 4.5 mm (+0.2 mm). The pins of the 16 A plugs are rectangle 4 (± 0.06) x 5 (± 0.06) mm wide, the corresponding openings are rectangle 4.5 (+0.2) x 5.5 (+0.2) mm wide.
Distance between conductors
In both the 10 A and 16 A versions, the distance between the phase conductor and the neutral conductor is 19 mm (± 0.15 mm). The protective conductor is offset by 5 mm (± 0.1 mm). In the three-phase plugs and sockets (T15 and T25), L2 and L3 are offset by 8 mm (± 0.1 mm) from the protective conductor, i.e. the distance between L1 and L2 or between N and L3 is 13 mm.

== Development ==
=== Origins ===
The 10 A series has been gradually standardized:

- T12 in 1937.
- T11 in 1952.
- T13 in 1953.
- T15 in 1979.

Then the 16 A variant (types 21, 23, 25) was introduced in 1997.

=== Elimination of historical safety issues with types 11, 12 and 13 ===
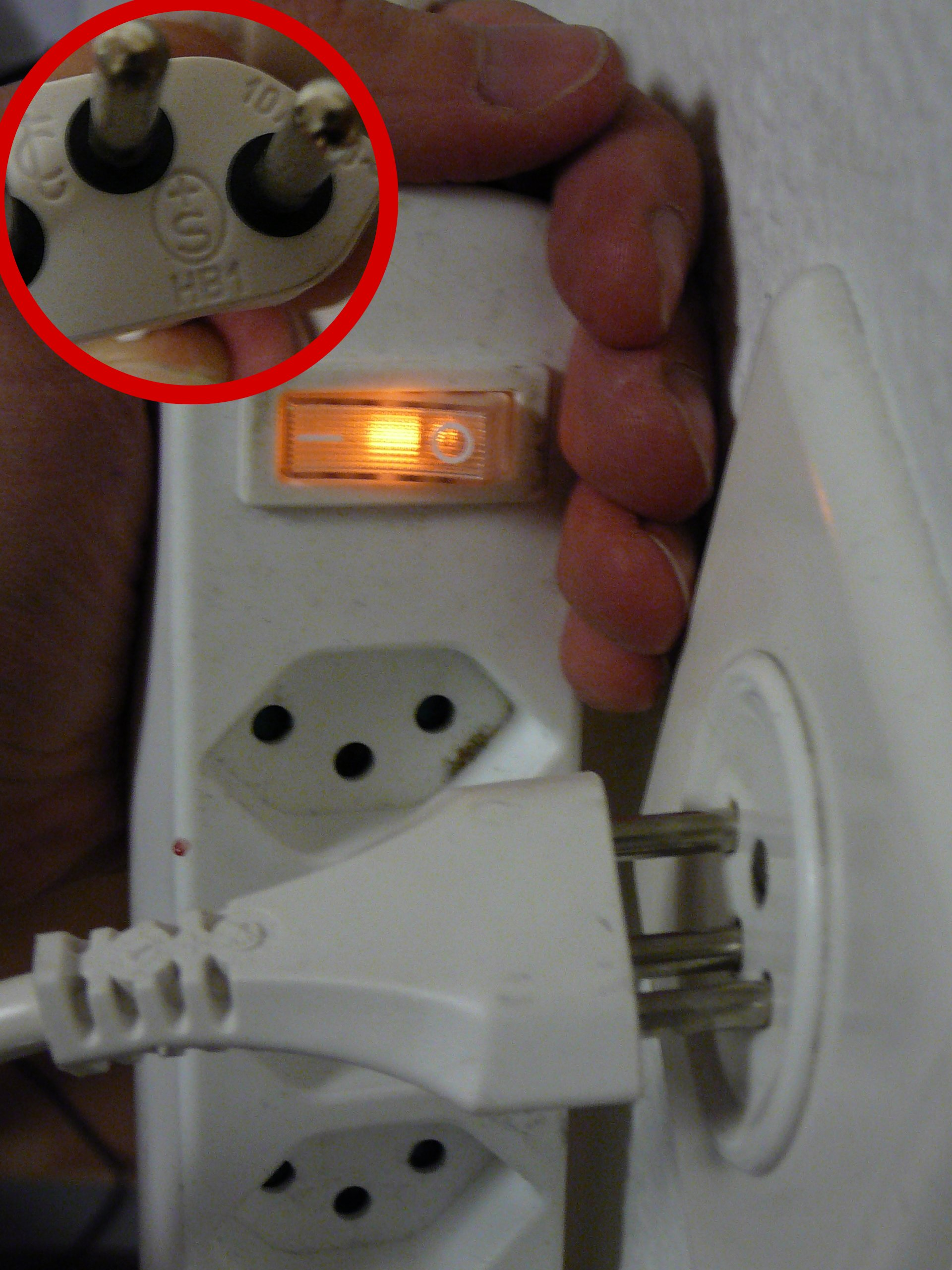
Pre-2009 T12 plug and pre-2017 T12 socket: fingers can touch dangerous voltage.

Originally, T12 plugs and sockets (the most common in domestic use) posed a safety concern. As the T12 sockets are flat and as the pins of the plugs did not have any insulation, the electrical contact was established in the pins even though the latter remained accessible, not fully inserted.

T13 sockets do not present this risk because they are recessed. When the electrical contact is made, the pins are fully within the recess and are therefore not accessible. T13 sockets were required in wet spaces (bathrooms, kitchens, etc.) and in many workplace environments.

The 2009 revision of the SEV 1011 standard therefore introduced two measures:

1. Eliminated T12 sockets (sale and installation prohibited after 31 December 2016) and instead mandates T13 sockets in all cases.
2. Requires partially insulated pins on T12 and T11 plugs, similar to Europlug. Plugs with uninsulated pins were prohibited for import and production after 31 December 2012, and for sale after 31 December 2016.

Measure 1 alone ensures electrical safety in new installations, but it does not improve the safety of existing installations. However, electrical outlets often remain in place for decades. Measure 2 then makes it possible to improve safety when using existing T12 sockets: when electrical contact is made in a partially insulated pin, the conductive part is no longer accessible, even with a non-recessed socket. Since electrical appliances are replaced comparatively often (more often than sockets), the situation should improve overall in a few years.

== See also ==
- Europlug
- AC power plugs and sockets
- IEC 60906-1 "Type N" derived from SN 441011 Type 12/13
