= Electrical wiring in the United Kingdom =

Electrical wiring in the United Kingdom refers to the practices and standards utilised in constructing electrical installations within domestic, commercial, industrial, and other structures and locations (such as marinas or caravan parks), within the region of the United Kingdom. This does not include the topics of electrical power transmission and distribution.

Installations are distinguished by a number of criteria, such as voltage (high, low, extra low), phase (single or three-phase), nature of electrical signal (power, data), type and design of cable (conductors and insulators used, cable design, solid/fixed or stranded/flexible, intended use, protective materials), circuit design (ring, radial), and so on.

Electrical wiring is ultimately regulated to ensure safety of operation, by such as the building regulations, currently legislated as the Building Regulations 2010, which lists "controlled services" such as electric wiring that must follow specific directions and standards, and the Electricity at Work Regulations 1989. The detailed rules for end-use wiring followed for practical purposes are those of BS 7671 Requirements for Electrical Installations. (IET Wiring Regulations), currently in its 18th edition, which provide the detailed descriptions referred to by legislation.

UK electrical wiring standards are largely harmonised with the regulations in other European countries and the international IEC 60446 standard. However, there are a number of specific national practices, habits and traditions that differ significantly from other countries, and which in some cases survived harmonisation. These include the use of ring circuits for domestic and light commercial fixed wiring, fused plugs, and for circuits installed prior to harmonisation, historically unique wiring colours.

== Common terminology ==
=== Regulatory ===
BS 7671 "Requirements for Electrical Installations. IET Wiring Regulations" (the regs, or wiring regs)
These are detailed rules for the design, installation and sign-off for end-user electrical installations. Compliance with BS 7671 is not mandatory, but official guidance states following BS 7671 is one way to demonstrate compliance with the building regulations.
xx^{th} edition
Reference to a specific edition of the BS 7671 regulations.
Building regulations – "Part P"
Section of the Building Regulations for England and Wales addressing electrical wiring and safety in residential situations and outbuildings.
Local authority building control (LABC; building control)
Local council department responsible for overseeing and administering building regulations.
Competent person scheme
Private organizations authorised by the state to supervise, accredit, and control the registration of installers, who, as members of this scheme, may self-certify that any domestic work classed as notifiable to a LABC that they have undertaken, is compliant with building regulations, thus avoiding inspection by LABC (or by a member of the third-party certifier scheme).
Minor electrical installation works certificate (MEIWC)
Formal certificate for confirming that minor work items, such as the addition of a new socket or light to an existing circuit, have been designed, constructed, inspected and tested in accordance with BS 7671.
Electrical installation certificate (EIC)
Formal certificate for confirming that a major piece of work, such as a completely new installation; complete rewire; addition of a whole new circuit; or replacement of a consumer unit, has been designed, constructed, inspected and tested in accordance with BS 7671.
Electrical installation condition report (EICR, ICR); previously the periodic inspection report (PIR)
Formal report of the condition of an existing wiring installation.
Permit to work
Formal confirmation that electrical wiring is isolated and fully made safe, prior to working on it, required prior to any high voltage works and other high risk activities.
Skilled Person (electrically); (formally "Competent Person")
Defined by BS 7671 as "Person who possesses, as appropriate to the nature of the electrical work to be undertaken, adequate education, training and practical skills, and who is able to perceive risks and avoid hazards which electricity can create". The Electricity at Work Regulations requires persons to be competent to prevent danger and injury.

=== Distribution within premises ===
Consumer unit, consumer control unit, or consumer distribution unit (CU, CDU, CCU; historically and commonly, fuse board/box)
Distribution board designed for ordinary low voltage single phase premises, primarily domestic and light commercial wiring. 3-phase power distribution boards are usually known as distribution boards.
Distribution board (DB)
Panel that splits power from one main source into separate circuits, each with independent protection.

=== Breakers and safety devices ===
Fuse
An overcurrent protection device. Prior to the invention of the resettable circuit breaker, distribution boards (then called fuseboxes) held fuses to protect individual circuits. The fuses used in fuseboxes were either of the cartridge type, similar to those found in UK plugs, or replaceable fuse-wire held within two-prong enclosures. Other standard use of fuses include those within appliance plugs, and the main fuse located on the end of the service (supply) cable (at the service head).
Breaker (circuit breaker, CB)
Any fixed device that breaks a circuit (that is, while it is drawing current) upon fault condition detection. Unlike a fuse, a circuit breaker can be reset by flipping a switch.
Miniature circuit breaker (MCB)
An overcurrent protection circuit breaker. These have standardised current ratings and tripping characteristics, and can be installed in close proximity in consumer units and distribution boards.
Residual-current device (RCD), also residual current circuit breaker (RCCB)
A circuit breaker triggered by unequal currents in line and neutral wires (i.e., electrical power is passing to earth). Mandatory for most circuits as of 17th Edition regulations.
Residual current circuit breaker with overcurrent protection (RCBO)
Combination of RCD and MCB; breaks circuit on being triggered either as an RCD or by overcurrent.
Surge protection device (SPD)
A transient overcurrent or overvoltage protection device; safely diverts away very short-lived spikes of current or voltage. Type 1 devices provide protection from direct lightning strikes to vulnerable structures (those having a conductive structure, a lightning rod, or an overhead power supply). These should always be used in combination with type 2. Type 2 devices protect against indirect strikes. Type 3 devices are supplementary to type 2, installed near sensitive equipment.
Arc fault detection device (AFDD)
A circuit breaker triggered by detection of an electric arc; breaks circuit on detecting an electric arc, which could develop from the likes of loose wires.
Earth leakage circuit breaker (ELCB)
An obsolete circuit breaker triggered by voltage on the earth wiring. This was a precursor to the RCD, with disadvantages of covering fewer fault scenarios, and potentially not working at all in the presence of parallel earth paths (e.g. bonding of gas/water pipes).
Isolator switch (or isolator)
Used for isolating a device from its power supply for maintenance or safety reasons. These are commonly being fitted in recent years, alongside fitting of new electricity meters, for the benefit of enabling electricians to replace consumer units without the hassle of arranging for the DNO to temporarily isolate the supply by removing the supply's main fuse (or taking on the potential danger and legal risks of doing so themself). There is a very important difference to be aware of between a device categorised as a switch vs. an isolator, and these devices may commonly be referred to as isolator/isolation switches when they may not actually be rated as anything more than isolators. A switch is a device capable of safely disconnecting the supply even if devices in the installation were drawing the full maximum load the installation was rated for. An isolator is not, it should only be used when the installation is drawing no power, i.e. the main switch in the consumer unit is off. When a supply is switched off under load, some degree of electrical arcing takes place across the contacts. A switch is designed to safely handle this. An isolator is not and could become weakened or instantly fail in a dangerous way, depending upon the size of the load. Utilising an isolator incorrectly as a switch is thus a significant hazard and this danger may well be unintuitive for many.

=== Wires and cables (conductors) ===
Live
A power-carrying conductor. This term is commonly used incorrectly by the general public in place of line, owing to changes to standard definitions since the 1980s. By definition it applies to any conductor that is intended to be energised during normal use, including a neutral conductor, but not by convention a PEN conductor. I.e line and neutral are live conductors, but earth is not.
Line (L; or phase line)
A power-carrying conductor in a typical low-voltage or domestic installation. Colour-coded brown (pre-2004: red).
Neutral (N)
A power-carrying conductor in a typical low-voltage or domestic installation, usually bonded to Earth (ground) voltage by the supplier. Colour-coded blue (pre-2004: black).
Earth (E; or protective earth (PE), or circuit protective conductor (CPC))
A conductor that provides a connection to Earth for safety and protection purposes, for both end-user devices and metal objects and components in the installation. Colour-coded green/yellow striped, though may be bare (uninsulated) within sheathed cable (pre-1976: solid green).
Conduit
A form of wire containment comprising plastic or metal tubing. Access points for maintenance and inspection are required at certain intervals of length.
Trunking
An alternative form of containment to conduit, comprising U-shaped plastic or metal with a removable lid.
Meter tails (or, tails)
The single-core cables connected to the electricity meter. On the supply side these connect the meter to the line and neutral conductors of the supply cable, via the service head (or cut out) located on the end of the supply cable. On the consumer side these conductors are then joined to the distribution board, possibly through an isolator (as is becoming more common).
Singles
A cable consisting of a single conductor.
Multi-core
A cable consisting of two or more conductors (not counting any earth conductor).
Twin and earth (T&E)
A commonly used type of multi-core cable, characterised by its flat profile and grey-coloured polyvinyl chloride sheath. It contains three conductors, two of which are insulated (line and neutral), and it is from this that the name twin and earth derives.
Steel-wire armoured (SWA)
Steel wire protected cable, mandatory for outdoor or buried use unless equivalent protection is provided via containment.
Flex
Refers to the flexible cord of a portable appliance.

=== Voltage and phases ===
High voltage
Any voltage in excess of low voltage. This is usually found only in industrial processes and electricity transmission and distribution networks.
Low voltage
Exceeding extra-low voltage, but not exceeding 1000 volts AC RMS or 1500 volts DC between conductors, and not exceeding 600 volts AC RMS or 900 volts DC between conductors and Earth. Almost all domestic; light commercial (e.g., offices) and industrial (for three-phase machinery) power is low voltage for regulation purposes.
Extra-low voltage (ELV)
Not exceeding 50 volts AC RMS or 120 volts ripple-free DC.
Separated extra-low voltage (SELV)
Extra-low voltage system that is also electrically isolated.
Single phase, three phase
At low voltage electricity may be supplied by the distributor (DNO) as either single or three phase. A single phase supply will comprise a single line conductor and a neutral conductor. A three phase supply will comprise three line conductors each pair with a phase separation of 120 degrees and (optionally) a neutral conductor. A separate earth conductor will normally be supplied in both cases but may not be present depending on the connection type.

=== Earthing (bonding) ===
Bonding (including main bonding, supplementary bonding and equipotential bonding)
Connection made to Earth, for protective purposes, either for individual components, for other metal objects in the premises (such as gas, water, or oil piping), or for the installation (or some part of it) as a whole.
Earth/ground rod
A long rod placed into the ground, bonding, with low impedance, the installation to Earth potential. Usually made from copper-clad, galvanised or stainless steel or copper, for corrosion prevention. There are other types of Earth bonding, such as: an Earth plate, an Earth mesh, or an Earth ring.

=== Circuit terminology ===
Accessory
A switch, socket, ceiling rose, etc., forming part of an electrical installation.
Load
Something that requires and consumes electricity to function, e.g. a lightbulb, appliance, etc.
Circuit
A set of electrical wires and connections, forming part of an installation, between a distribution board and a fixed load, or between a distribution board and an accessory or daisy-chained set of accessories for connecting loads (sockets or light fittings), or between two distribution boards, enabling power to be provided. I.e. a final circuit or distribution circuit.
Distribution circuit
A circuit whereby one distribution board supplies power to another (via a protective device like a breaker).
Final circuit
A circuit providing power to a set of sockets, light fittings, or fixed equipment, from a single protective device (breaker) in a distribution board. (Not applicable to RCDs in a split way configuration which each sit behind a set of MCBs – each MCB would serve an individual final circuit in such a setup). Each final circuit will be arranged in a radial or ring final form if not simply serving a single fixed appliance. It may also have one or more fused or unfused spurs attached. The use of the word final comes from the fact that these circuits are the last piece of the power distribution infrastructure, finally delivering generated power to where it will be consumed.
Radial
A circuit where the conductors providing the power circuit (and earthing) are simply connected from one accessory (e.g. socket) to the next in a daisy-chain like fashion. You might think of this as the supplied power radiating out from the source to reach each accessory.
Ring (or ring final)
A ring final circuit is similar to a radial except what would be the end of the circuit instead loops back to the source protective device in the distribution board. Thus each individual conductor, line, neutral and earth, actually forms a loop (or ring), from the source, out, and back around to the source again. This has long been a standard means for wiring domestic and other light commercial premises in the UK, but is not often seen elsewhere in the world. It allows power between source and accessories to be split between two parallel paths. On the downside though it's more difficult to test, and should a break in a connection occur it could go unnoticed leading to one side of the ring potentially taking on an excessive amount of current flow, and increased earth fault loop impedance increasing disconnection times.
Loop
This term applies to radial lighting circuits where junctions are made at ceiling roses with line and switched line wires. Not to be confused with the loop-like arrangement of a ring final circuit.
(Unfused) spur
A branch off of a final circuit supplying a single accessory, especially from a ring final circuit.
Fused spur
A spur branched off of a final circuit via a connection protected by a suitable fuse, and thus one that may connect to more than one accessory.
A de-energized circuit
A circuit that is isolated from power and not at a potential different from Earth, and thus safe to work on.

== Wiring colours ==
=== Conductor colours ===
The standard wiring colours in the UK, as of 2006, are the same as elsewhere in Europe and follow international standard IEC 60446. This colour scheme had already been introduced for appliance flexes in the UK in the early 1970s, however the original red/black colour scheme recommended by the IEE for fixed wiring was retained until 2006, albeit with change to a green/yellow striped earth in 1976. As a result, the international standard blue/brown scheme is as of 2006 found in most appliance flexes. In fixed wiring, the blue/brown scheme is only found in newer (post-2004) installations, and the old IEE red/black scheme is likely to be encountered in existing installations for many more decades.

Earlier in the 20th century, green and blue were used as a neutral alongside black, which became the only neutral colour from 1943. In the 13th edition of the regulations, published in 1955 (and known then as the IEE regulations), black was used for both neutral and earth, although only for fixed wiring. It was changed to green in the 14th edition in 1966 and then a phased change to green/yellow in amendments to the 14th edition over the following decade.

An amendment to the 18th edition changed functional earth from cream to pink, which came into effect in September 2020.

Conductor identification colours as specified in the regulations
		1916 (7th Ed.)	1924 (8th Ed.)	1934 (10th Ed.)	1943 (11th Ed.)	1955 (13th Ed.)	1966 (14th Ed.)	1969 (14th Ed.)	1976 (14th Ed.)	1992 (15th Ed.)	2004 (16th Ed.)	2020 (18th Ed.)
Protective earth (PE)		Not specified				Black	Green	Green Green/Yellow	Green/Yellow	Green/Yellow	Green/Yellow	Green/Yellow
Neutral (N)		Green	Black Blue	Black	Black	Black	Black	Black	Black	Black	Blue	Blue
Single phase	Line (L)	Red	Red	Red	Red	Red	Red	Red	Red	Red	Brown	Brown
Three-phase	L1	Red	Red	Red	Red	Red	Red	Red	Red	Red	Brown	Brown
Three-phase	L2	Yellow White	Yellow White	White	White	White	Yellow	Yellow	Yellow	Yellow	Black	Black
Three-phase	L3	Blue	Green	Green	Blue	Blue	Blue	Blue	Blue	Blue	Grey	Grey
Functional earth (FE)		Not specified								Cream	Cream	Pink
Flex	L	Not specified				Red	Red	Brown	Brown	Brown	Brown	Brown
Flex	N	Not specified				Black	Black	Blue	Blue	Blue	Blue	Blue
Flex	PE	Not specified				Green	Green	Green/Yellow	Green/Yellow	Green/Yellow	Green/Yellow	Green/Yellow

The standard colours in fixed wiring were harmonised in 2004 with the regulations in other European countries and the international IEC 60446 standard. For a transitional period (April 2004 – March 2006) either set of colours were allowed (but not both), provided that any changes in the colour scheme were clearly labelled. From April 2006, only the new colours should be used for any new wiring.

==== Potential for confusion ====
The UK changed colour codes three decades after most other European countries, as in 1977 the change of neutral and phase colours was not considered safe by the IEE. Blue, previously used as a phase colour, is now the colour for neutral. Black, which was previously used for neutral, now indicates a phase.

Household wiring does not usually use three-phase supplies and the clash only occurs in three-phase systems. Wiring to the old standard can be detected by use of a red wire. The new standard colour code does not use red. Where new wiring is mixed with old, cables must be clearly marked to prevent interchange of phase and neutral.

Variation in the earth/ground conductor's colour at an earlier date than the remainder of the colours means its colour should not be used as an indication of the old vs new standard cable or colour assignment.

==== Other colour schemes ====
On telecommunications nominal 48 V DC supplies, the live is usually −42 V (flat batteries) to almost −57 V (float charge).

The IEC currently specifies a colour-coding for new local DC distribution. These are:

Function	Alphanumeric	Colour
2-wire unearthed DC power circuit
Positive	L+	Brown
Negative	L−	Grey
2-wire earthed DC power circuit
Negative (−) earthed
Positive	L+	Brown
Negative	M	Blue
Positive (+) earthed
Positive	M	Blue
Negative	L−	Grey
3-wire DC power circuit
Positive	L+	Brown
Mid-wire	M	Blue
Negative	L−	Grey

There is a long history of colour changes; prior to 1964 white was used instead of yellow as the second phase, and before World War II, a black earth and a green third phase in place of green earth and white phase was permitted. The regulations permitted (and still do) the use of any wire colour that is not an earth colour, providing it is unambiguously identified at all connections by clear labelling or by correctly coloured over-sleeving. It was not uncommon on commercial builds of the 1960s with a three phase supply for the phase colours (red, yellow, blue) to be used throughout single phase sub circuits thus indicating the phase origin of the supply, in this case no over-sleeving was used and can give rise to confusion when encountered today.

Direct current mains supplies are only of historical interest in the UK but the colour coding was red for live and black for earthed (regardless of the polarity). Hardly any loads were polarity sensitive when direct current systems were introduced (principally incandescent lighting, heating systems or series direct current motors) and it was considered more important to identify the live wire than the polarity. In later years of direct current supplies, however, much more equipment became sensitive to polarity, such as many domestic radios & television sets. Where all three wires were available, the historical colour code was red (positive), black (middle) and white (negative). The negative line changed to yellow in 1964, and then to blue in 1966.

=== Outer sheath colours ===
The colour of the outer sheath is currently grey, or white for low halogen material. Previously cables from different manufacturers were available variously in grey or white, with no significance attached to the sheath colour. The grey colour was adopted by cable manufacturers to match older lead or silver sheathed flat cables, with some manufacturers using a silver grey polyvinyl chloride. Additionally twin & earth cable was available in red for fire alarms until the early 2000s.

== Circuit design ==
UK fixed wiring circuits, unlike those found in almost all other countries, make widespread use of ring circuit designs, as well as radial circuit designs often seen in other countries. (This was one of the recommendations of the Electrical Installations Committee, convened in 1942 as part of the Post War Building Studies programme, which in 1944 determined that the ring final circuit offered a more efficient and lower cost method to support a greater number of sockets.) It continues to be the usual wiring method for domestic and light commercial socket and device wiring in the UK. Lighting circuits, which typically have lower power requirements, are usually radially wired, confusingly sometimes called "loop" wiring.

In both ring and radial circuits, the circuit wiring starts at a consumer unit or distribution board, and traverses in turn a number of sockets or devices (point-to-point style), before terminating. The difference is that a radial circuit simply ends upon reaching the last connected device in any branch, whereas in a ring circuit the termination is made by joining the end of the circuit from the last device back to its starting point. A ring circuit therefore forms a continuous ring, while a radial may be a simple linear chain, though it may split and have several branches. This means that in a ring there are two independent paths from the supply to every device. Ideally, the ring acts like two radial circuits proceeding in opposite directions around the ring, the dividing point between them dependent on the distribution of load in the ring. If the load is evenly split across the two directions, the current in each direction is half of the total, allowing the use of wire with half the current-carrying capacity. In practice, it is impossible to ensure the load does split evenly, so regulations require a thicker wire, of at least 2/3 the current capacity of the fuse or circuit breaker.

The innovation that made ring circuits feasible in the UK was the introduction of plugs that contained their own fuse. There were three competing designs, but only one ultimately survived and became the version specified in British Standard 1363. BS1363 plugs could historically be fitted with a range of fuses up to 13A. Only the 3A and 13A are the official choices, though 5A are available and often fitted to small appliances that take a large inrush current. This means that every load plugged in is covered by an appropriate protective device in its plug, so that the whole ring may then be protected by (usually) a 32A breaker at the distribution panel. In contrast, circuits feeding any other kind of socket outlet need to be protected by a breaker that will not allow the socket's rating to be exceeded, and so the radial circuits generally used with outlets such as the European Schuko style outlets generally have to be protected by a 16A breaker at the distribution panel; this limits the total load on the circuit, and hence such circuits tend to have fewer socket outlets.

Cables are most commonly a single outer sheath containing separately-insulated line and neutral wires, and a non-insulated protective earth to which sleeving is added when exposed. Such cable is commonly referred to as twin and earth or simply T&E. Standard sizes have a conductor cross sectional area of 1, 1.5, 2.5, 4, 6 and 10 mm^{2}. Most domestic wiring uses:

UK house wiring conventions
Type	Breaker rating	Live conductor size
Lighting	6A	1mm^{2} T&E
Power (radial)	16A	2.5mm^{2} T&E
Power (ring)	32A	2.5mm^{2} T&E
Cooker/shower	32A	4mm^{2} T&E

The earthing conductor is uninsulated since it is not intended to have any voltage difference from surrounding earthed articles. Additionally, if the insulation of a line or neutral wire becomes damaged, then the wire is more likely to earth itself on the bare earth conductor, and in doing so either to trip the circuit breaker, RCD, or to rupture the fuse by drawing too much current.

== Earthing and bonding ==
Earthing and bonding are used together to provide shock protection by avoiding a dangerous combination of magnitude and duration of the voltage to which people may be exposed in the event of a fault within the installation or outside the installation. (Exposure may be from e.g. hand to hand or hand to foot, between simultaneously accessible conductive surfaces, which might include the Earth itself, mildly conductive floors and walls, metal taps, pipes, electrical appliances etc. Examples of faults are an insulation failure between a line conductor and a metallic frame of an appliance within the installation, a break in a combined protective-earth and neutral conductor in the supply, or an insulation fault in the supply transformer causing the whole low-voltage system to rise in potential.) Conductors for these protective functions of earthing and bonding are insulated with green/yellow (striped) colour coding, which is not permitted for any other conductors.

Earthing connects exposed conductive parts of electrical equipment to a main earthing terminal (MET), which is connected to a "means of earthing" that somehow connects it to the Earth itself (the ground/soil/planet!). In installations fed from low-voltage public supplies in the UK this means of earthing can be any of the methods TN-S, TN-C-S or TT defined in BS 7671. In the event of an insulation fault from a live conductor to an appliance's metal frame (an exposed conductive part), the frame could—if not so connected—be dangerous if touched by someone who is also for example standing outside on the ground, or standing inside on a concrete floor, or holding a tap whose pipe connects it electrically into the ground. Protective earthing limits the combination of magnitude and duration of the dangerous voltage that could exist between the exposed conductive part and the Earth itself. In conventional installations in the UK the voltage between an appliance frame and the Earth itself during a zero-impedance fault has a dangerous magnitude: it might be reduced to about half of the 230 V line-earth voltage, which is well above the 50 V usually accepted as safe for an AC system, or it might be nearly 230 V in a TT system with a poor earth electrode for the installation. The duration of this voltage must therefore be limited, which is done by "automatic disconnection of supply" (ADS) either by overcurrent protection devices (OCPDs), or by residual current devices (RCDs) that specifically detect the current escaping from the intended circuit, allowing them to have a far lower tripping current. In TT systems it is almost always necessary to have an RCD, as earth electrodes usually have many times higher resistance than a typical supply cable, so earth-fault currents are relatively low. In the TN-S or TN-C-S systems none of the "earth fault" current necessarily passes through the Earth itself, as there is a metallic circuit for the entire earth-fault loop: adequate ADS times may often be achieved by normal OCPDs. However, the connection to the Earth itself is always relevant, since the Earth forms a mildly conductive surface that we cannot easily avoid (e.g. a person standing on the ground and touching a metal appliance or tap or building-framework that is connected with the electrical installation's protective earthing system). In TT systems the installation's earth electrode needs to have low enough impedance to operate protection if a safe voltage (usually taken as 50 V) between the installation and remote earthing is exceeded; in TN systems the system's neutral point needs a low resistance connection to Earth to prevent a fault between a line conductor and some unintended earth electrode from displacing the neutral-point potential to a dangerous level compared to the Earth.

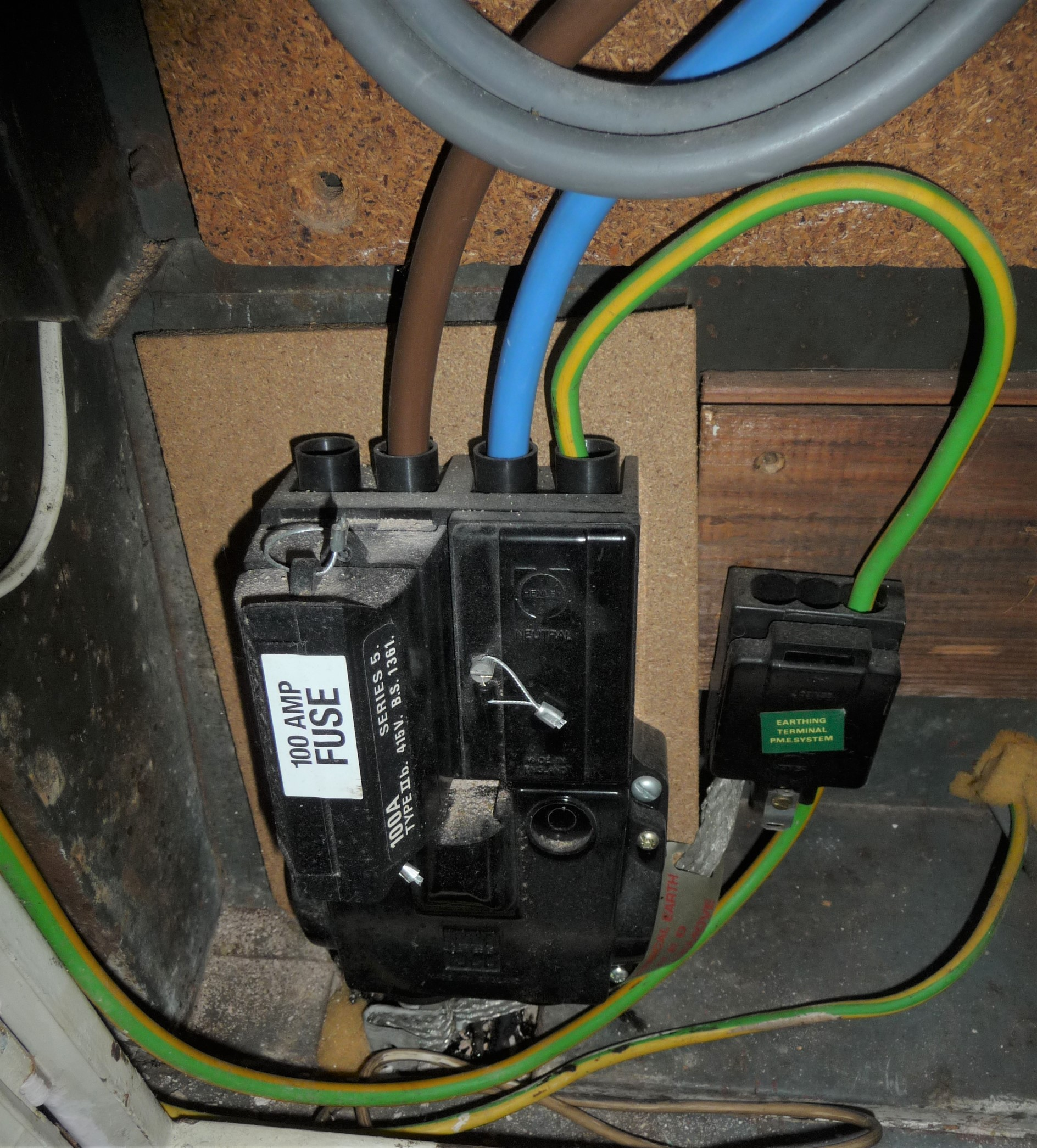
UK 230 volt domestic incoming underground electrical supply cable terminating in a service head with a 100 A main fuse on the line conductor (brown). The earthing system is TN-C-S per the green/yellow earthing conductor being connected within the neutral (blue conductor) side of the service head. A secondary earthing connection (per a local code of practice in areas prone to underground mining subsidence) is taken from the supply cable outer (lead) sheathing, using a bare braid, which is joined to the primary earthing through a connector block to the right. This additional earthing qualifies it as a PME (protective multiple earthing) setup, hence the label on the connector block.

Bonding is the connection of conductive parts together, to reduce the voltage between them. This is an important measure for electric shock protection. When this protective function is the purpose of bonding, BS 7671 describes the bonding by the term "protective equipotential bonding"; this does not mean that the bonding guarantees perfect equipotentiality, but just that it reduces the differences of potential. In the following, this formal term is abbreviated to "bonding". Without adequate bonding, dangerous voltages could arise between conductive parts that can be touched simultaneously, either due to problems outside the installation, or to faults in the installation.

Main bonding connects "extraneous conductive parts" such as mains water / gas supply pipes, structural parts of buildings, communication cable sheaths, lightning protection systems etc., to the main earthing terminal. These parts could otherwise introduce potentials that are different from the potential of the installation's earthing system. The main bonding avoids dangerous differences in potential being introduced into the installation, between different extraneous conductive parts (e.g. two different pipework systems), or between extraneous conductive parts and exposed conductive parts.

Supplementary bonding connects simultaneously touchable conductive parts in local parts of an installation: the parts may be a mixture of exposed conductive parts and extraneous conductive parts. This reduces the voltage between them, even in fault conditions. Supplementary bonding is particularly used in situations such as bathrooms, where body resistance is low and therefore requires magnitude and duration of touch voltages to be very limited.

In special circumstances (not domestic installations) bonding with deliberate lack of connection to Earth (earth-free local equipotential bonding) may be used. Bonding, by the IEC 60364 terminology used in BS 7671, should not be seen as just an extra to earthing. In recent US practice, which differs considerably from IEC principles and terminology, "bonding" is used more widely as a term for all the aspects of earthing that are not literally connections with the Earth itself ("grounding"); so the connection of protective earth conductors to the supply neutral (since the TN-C-S system is the only permitted form in their residential installations) is now named bonding rather than earthing. This is not the case in the UK.

== Supply, metering and distribution ==
=== Single phase (standard for domestic and light commercial) ===
A single phase supply typically consists of an armoured cable connected to a service head (aka. cut out), the sealed box containing the main supply fuse. This fuse will typically be rated either 60, 80 or 100 amps. Separate line and neutral cables (tails) go from here to an electricity meter. More tails proceed from the meter into a consumer unit (or fusebox in older installations), possibly via an isolator. Some installations may have multiple consumer units (or an old fusebox along with one or more consumer units), in which case the meter tails may first go into a junction box from which they split out to each individual unit. Such junction boxes are typically known as Henley blocks (a splitter box used in low voltage electrical engineering made by W.T.Henley & Co.), or "Isco" blocks, both names deriving from common brands.

An older property, pre-1960s approximately, if it has not yet been upgraded, may still have a fusebox covering all or part of the installation. Such an old fusebox will contain a main switch and a set of fuses, possibly of the rewirable kind. A more modern consumer unit will contain at a minimum a main switch and an individual miniature circuit breaker (MCB) for each final circuit. Fuses and MCBs are overcurrent devices providing overload, short-circuit and earth fault protection.

Additionally:

- Since the 17th edition of the wiring regulations new installations are typically required to use a 30 mA residual-current device (RCD) on certain circuits. For installations having a TT earthing system, this may be crucial to achieving acceptable disconnection times during short-circuit or earth fault conditions. Within a consumer unit RCD protection may be found in the form of either RCBOs (residual current circuit breakers with overcurrent protection) which combine MCB and RCD technology, or a 'split-way' arrangement in which one or more RCCBs each protect a subset of MCBs that need RCD protection. Reductions in the cost of devices and the principle of least disruption now favour use of RCBOs. Of note, not all RCD protection is equal; there are four types of RCD: types AC, A, F and B. As of the 18th edition of the regulations only type A is now permitted for general use. Type AC is likely to be found in older installations.
- Since the 18th edition it has become common practice for many new installations to include a surge protection device (SPD) for protection from direct and/or indirect lightning strikes. Of note, since an SPD could fail in such a way that it forms a short-circuit, they may be fitted in combination with a dedicated MCB.
- Also since the 18th edition, some installations are now required to use arc-fault detection devices (AFDDs).

The ownership of an installation can typically be divided into three parts: (1) The service cable and service head (cut out and its main fuse) belong to the regional distribution network operator (DNO). (2) The electricity meter, along with the tails connecting it to the service head, plus if there is a supplier-fitted isolator, the isolator and tails between the meter and isolator, belong to the electricity supply company (energy supplier; the company who will bill for any energy consumed). (3) The consumer unit and obviously its final circuits, plus the tails connecting the consumer unit either directly to the meter or to a supplier-fitted isolator, belong to the owner of the premises. (If an owner has their own isolator fitted between the meter and consumer unit, then naturally they would own it and the tails on both sides of it.) The owner of the property may own any Henley blocks between the meter and consumer unit(s), or they could belong to the supplier.

Service heads, meters and energy supplier-fitted isolators are always fitted with security tags (though often missing) as both a safety measure and an attempt to stop or deter meter tampering and electricity theft. Interfering with the DNO or energy supplier-owned equipment without their authorisation may be a crime.

==== Supply voltage ====
The supply voltage in single phase installations is nominally 230 V AC (RMS) at 50 Hz. However, in practice it will typically be around 240 V. This is so because distributors are not actually required to provide exactly 230 V, but rather a voltage within an asymmetric tolerance of ^{+10%}_{−6%} of 230 V, meaning anything between 216.2 and 253.0 V is acceptable; and furthermore because prior to the introduction of this standard, the previous standard had been 240 V, or more specifically 240 V ±6% (225.6–254.4 V), which almost perfectly falls within the new standard, so distributors lacked sufficient motivation to change the infrastructure to provide a new typical voltage of 230.

The 230 V ^{+10%}_{−6%} standard was implemented on 1 January 1995 (Electricity Supply Regulations, SI 1994, No. 3021) following a Europe-wide agreement reached in 1988 to unify the various national voltages, which had ranged between 220 and 240 V, to a common European standard (CENELEC Harmonization Document HD 472 S1:1988). Though in practice this new standard may have made little difference to the voltage provided to premises by distributors, owing to the allowed tolerance range, there was however a significant change in terms of device manufacturing – in order to get a CE compliance marking, devices must correctly operate across a voltage range of 230 V ±10%, enabling pan-European compatibility.

It was proposed that the ^{+10%}_{−6%} tolerance of the new 230 V standard be widened to ±10% by around 2003 but this has never transpired.

Note that 240 V AC RMS means a momentary peak voltage of plus or minus 339 volts (see this explanation), occurring 50 (either positive or negative) or 100 (both, opposing) times per second. At the tolerances mentioned above, the peak voltage could be (momentarily) larger still.

=== Three-phase supply ===
Three phase power is usually supplied as needed, for commercial and industrial premises. While three phase loads take balanced power from the three phases, any single phase loads are distributed to try to ensure equal loading of the three phases, and a neutral may be provided to take any imbalance. Each row of breakers in the distribution board is fed from a different phase (L1, L2, and L3), to allow 3-pole common-trip breakers to have one pole on each phase. The distributor's service head will contain a main fuse for each phase. Nominal voltage is usually 230 V AC between phase and neutral, and 400 V AC between phases.

Some very large industrial facilities may instead receive power at voltages as high as 132 kV AC RMS (high-voltage).

== Isolating devices ==
Single-pole switches are most commonly used to control circuits. These switches isolate only the line conductor feeding the load and are used for lighting and other smaller loads. For larger loads like air conditioners, cookers, water heaters and other fixed appliances a double-pole switch is used, which also isolates the neutral for greater safety. A three or four-pole isolator or circuit breaker is used for three-phase loads, for devices with both permanent and switched supplies (such as bathroom extractor fans) and also at the distribution board to isolate all the phases. A three-phase installation with a TT earthing system is an example where four-pole devices would be required.

== Outlets and accessories ==
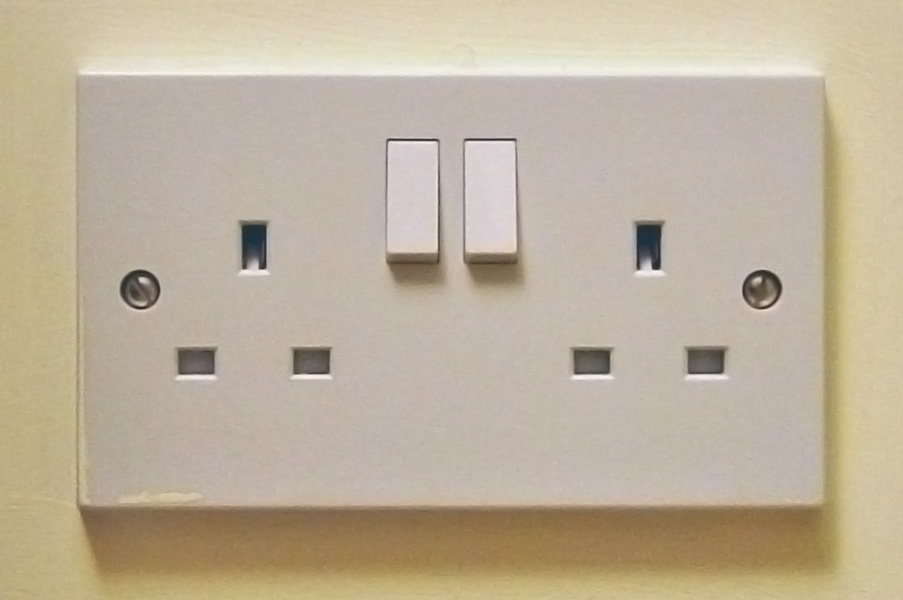
British 13 A double socket

Many accessories for electrical installations (e.g., wall sockets, switches) sold in the UK are designed to fit into the mounting boxes defined in BS 4662:2006—Boxes for flush mounting of electrical accessories—Requirements, test methods and dimensions, with an 86 mm × 86 mm square face plate that is fixed to the rest of the enclosure by two M3.5 screws (typ. 25 mm or 40 mm long) located on a horizontal centre line, 60.3 mm apart. Double face plates for BS 4662 boxes measure 147 mm × 86 mm and have the two screws 120.6 mm apart.

Accessories in the BS 4662 format are only available in a comparatively limited range of designs and lack the product diversity and design sophistication found in other European markets. The UK installation-accessory industry is therefore occasionally criticised for being overly conservative. As many modern types of electrical accessories (e.g., home automation control elements from non-UK manufacturers) are not available in BS 4662 format, other standard mounting boxes are increasingly used as well, such as those defined in DIN 49073-1 (60 mm diameter, 45 mm deep, fixing screws 60 mm apart) or, less commonly in the UK, ANSI/NEMA OS-1.

The commonly used domestic wall-mount socket used in the UK for currents up to 13 A is defined in BS 1363-2 and normally includes a switch. For higher currents or three-phase output, IEC 60309 sockets are to be used instead.

Many high load non-UK-sourced appliances need IEC 60309 connectors (or wiring via a British Standard "20 A connection unit") in the UK because of the lower plug rating.

=== Plug and accessory fuses (or, cartridge fuse) ===
Flexible appliance cords require protection at a lower current than that provided by the final circuit overcurrent protection device. This additional protection device may be contained within either the appliance plug (by far the most common solution) or the connection unit (a fused socket or possibly a fused spur protecting the socket). It is normally a ceramic cartridge fuse to BS 1362:1973, commonly rated at either 3 A (red), 5 A (black), or 13 A (brown), but some accessories and adaptors use a ceramic cartridge fuse to BS 646:1958. (Note that it is not intended that the fuse should protect the appliance itself, for which it is still necessary for the appliance designer to take the necessary precautions).

In the case of permanently connected equipment, a fused connection unit (FCU) to BS 1363-4 is used, this may include an isolator switch and a neon bulb to indicate if the equipment is powered.

== Residential wiring ==
=== Cable types ===
In domestic wiring, the following cable types are typically used:

==== Internal wiring ====
- Twin and earth, or multiple core, polyvinyl chloride-insulated and -sheathed cables, or
- Single-core polyvinyl chloride-insulated cables in conduit (fixed internal wiring; less common in domestic installations)
- Flexible cords

==== Supply side wiring ====
- 2-, 3-, or 4-core polyvinyl chloride-insulated, steel-wire armoured, polyvinyl chloride-sheathed cables
- Polyvinyl chloride-insulated, polyvinyl chloride-sheathed (unarmoured cables)
- 3- and 4-core XLPE-insulated, steel-wire armoured, polyvinyl chloride-sheathed cables

=== Selection of conductors and circuit breakers ===
The selection of conductors must be made taking into consideration both the maximum voltage drop allowed at the load end and also the current carrying capacity of the conductor. Conductor size and voltage drop tables are available to determine the selection, which will be based on the load current supplied and factors such as building insulation.

The choice of circuit breaker is also based on the normal rated current of the circuit. Modern circuit breakers have overload and short circuit current protection combined. The overload protection is for protection of the equipment against sustained small-to-medium increase in current above the rated current, while short circuit protection is for the protection of the conductors against high over-currents due to short circuits.

For domestic circuits the following choices are typically adopted for selecting conductor and circuit breaker sizes.

Circuit breaker and conductor selection
Capacity	Conductor size, copper		Circuit breaker capacity (A)
Capacity	Main (mm^{2})	Earth (mm^{2})	Circuit breaker capacity (A)
Up to 600 W	1.5	1.5	6
600–1,200 W	1.5, or 2.5	1.5	10
1,200–1,800 W	2.5, or 4.0	2.5	16
A1 ring circuit (serves max. 100 m^{2} area)	2.5	2.5	30, or 32
A2 radial circuit (serves max. 75 m^{2} area)	4.0	2.5	30, or 32
A3 radial circuit (serves max. 50 m^{2} area)	2.5	1.5	20
Air conditioner 18,000 BTU/hr (1.5 TR)	6.0	6.0	30, or 32
Cooker	6.0	6.0	30, or 32
Water heater	4.0	4.0	20

For distribution boards the incomer circuit breaker rating depends on the current demand at that board. For this the maximum demand and diversity are taken into consideration, based on which the probable current is calculated. Diversity is the condition that all appliances are not likely to be working all at the same time or at their maximum ratings. From this the maximum demand is calculated and the currents are added to determine the load current and hence the rating of the circuit breaker.

=== Special locations ===
==== Bathrooms ====
The installation of electrical devices in bathrooms and shower rooms is regulated in Section 701 of BS 7671:2018, and Part P of the Building Regulations in England and Wales. For such rooms, four special zones are defined, in which additional protection is required for electrical facilities:

- Zone 0 is the smallest cuboid volume that contains the bath, shower basin, etc.
- Zone 1 is the area above zone 0, up to a height of 2.25 m above the floor.
- Zone 2 is the area above zone 1 up to a height of 3 m, as well as the area that is horizontally within 0.6 m from zone 1.
- Older regulations defined zone 3 as the area above zone 2 up to a height of 3 m, as well as the area that is horizontally within 2.4 m from zone 2; from BS 7671:2008, this is replaced by the term outside the zones. This includes any space under the bath or shower that can only be accessed with a tool.

Within zone 0, no devices are allowed apart from suitable equipment and/or insulated pull cords. Previously, in zone 1, only separated extra-low voltage (SELV) devices were permitted. Any AC transformer supplying such a device must be located outside zones 0–2. Since the introduction of the 17th edition of the IET Wiring Regulations in 2008, 230 V fixtures such as light fittings and extractor fans are permitted in zones 1 and 2, subject to those fixtures meeting the appropriate ingress protection ratings. The minimum required ingress protection rating in zone 0 is IPX7 in zone 1 and IPX4 in zone 2. If water jets are likely to occur, at least IPX5 is required in zones 1–3. Otherwise, in zone 3 and beyond, an ingress protection rating of IP20 is the minimum required. Equipment in zones 1 and 2 must be protected by a 30 mA residual current device (RCD).

Shaving sockets (with isolating transformer) are permitted in zone 2 if direct spray from a shower is unlikely, even if they are only IP20. Before the 2008 regulations, such shaving sockets were the only sockets permitted in a bathroom or shower room. Since BS 7671:2008 normal domestic sockets are permitted, at distances greater than 3 m from the edge of the zones, providing the circuit is RCD protected. As the new regulations require all general purpose sockets not for use by skilled or instructed persons to be RCD protected, this effectively permits normal wiring in the larger bathroom. (Earlier British wiring rules in bathrooms used to be far more restrictive, leading to British peculiarities in bathrooms such as the use of cord switches. The 2011 edition of the wiring regulations is more flexible now, placing restrictions on bathroom installations that are now similar to those in other European countries.)

==== Swimming pools ====
For swimming pools, Section 603 of BS 7671 defines similar zones. In some of these zones, only industrial sockets according to IEC 60309 are permitted, in order to discourage the use of portable domestic appliances with inappropriate ingress protection rating.

==== Portable outdoor equipment ====
For use outdoors or in other wet locations (but not bathrooms) special sockets are made. These can be divided into three main groups: industrial sockets, which are totally different from the standard sockets; sockets with the same pinout as normal sockets but that will only seal properly when the correct plug and socket are used together (e.g., the 5 A, 13 A, and 15 A variants of Lewden sockets); and sockets that completely enclose a normal plug with a seal around the flex (e.g., MK Masterseal).

Sockets that are outside or can "feasibly supply equipment outside the equipotential zone" (a wording that is fairly ambiguous and the exact interpretation of which is subject to some controversy) should be protected by a 30 mA, or lower, RCD to provide additional safety. Since 2008, all sockets for general use should be RCD protected, removing the questions that used to arise, such as if a socket by the door might power a lawnmower does it need an RCD?

== Construction sites ==
The risk of electrical shock on construction sites can be reduced by several measures, including reduction of the normal 230-volt distribution voltage to 110 volts for electrical lighting and power tools. By using a centre-tapped transformer, each conductor of the circuit is only at 55 volts with respect to Earth. This reduces the chance of dangerous electrical shock when using power tools in wet locations. Where 230 volts must be used, a residual current device (RCD) can be used to detect small leakage currents and automatically isolate faulty equipment. In sites where hazardous flammable gases or liquids are present, special wiring rules are applied to reduce the probability of a spark igniting a fire or explosion.

== Legal and regulatory ==
=== Legal basis ===
In England and Wales, the Building Regulations (Approved Document: Part P) require domestic electrical installations to be designed and installed safely according to the "fundamental principles" given in British Standard BS 7671 Chapter 13, most recently updated in July 2018. These are very similar to the fundamental principles defined in international standard IEC 60364-1 and equivalent national standards in other countries. Accepted ways for fulfilling this legal requirement include:

- the BS 7671 regulations, colloquially referred to as "the regs";
- the rules of an equivalent standard approved by a member of the EEA (e.g., DIN/VDE 0100);
- guidance given in installation manuals that are consistent with BS 7671, such as the IET On-Site Guide and IET Guidance Notes Nos. 1 to 8.

In Scotland, the Building (Scotland) Regulations 2004 apply.

Installations in commercial and industrial premises must satisfy various safety legislation, such as the Electricity at Work Regulations 1989. Again, recognised standards and practices, such as BS 7671 "Wiring Regulations", are used to help meet the legislative requirements.

=== Regulations ===
All new electrical work in England and Wales within a domestic setting must comply with Part P of the Building Regulations first introduced on 1 January 2005, which are legally enforceable. One way of achieving this is to apply British Standard BS 7671 (the "Wiring Regulations"), including carrying out adequate inspection and testing to this standard of the completed works. British Standard BS 7671 (the "Wiring Regulations") is not statutory, thus someone doing electrical work is allowed to deviate from the wiring regulations to some degree, but it is generally accepted that it is best to follow the wiring regulations to the highest standard possible. Electrical work does not have to be compliant with BS 7671, but if a casualty or fatality occurs as a direct result of that electrical work, and this results in a legal action, then it may be necessary to justify major deviations from the principles of BS 7671 and other appropriate standards.

Some of the restrictions first introduced with the 2005 version of Part P of the Building Regulations were highly controversial, especially the rules surrounding work carried out by unregistered electricians, builders and DIYers. Under the new regulations, commencement of any work other than simple changes became notifiable to the local building control authority; "other than simple" in this context meant any work in a kitchen or bathroom other than like-for-like replacement, work in other areas more than just adding extra lights or sockets to an existing circuit, or meeting certain other criteria, such as outdoor wiring. To coincide with the new regulations, the Government approved several professional bodies to award "competent persons" status to enterprises which meet the minimum agreed criteria for Scheme entry. Scheme membership allows an enterprise to "self-certify" work that they carry out without the requirement to have undergone any formal installation training or to hold relevant qualifications in electrical installation practices – since practical competence can be assessment-based only. The minimum criteria for Scheme entry are set by the EAS Committee, on which all of the commercial enterprises running Competent Persons Schemes are actively represented.

The local authority's building control must be informed of any notifiable work carried out by someone who is not registered under this scheme before it is started (unless it is an emergency) and must subsequently be approved by them. Originally, it was widely understood by some local authorities that inspection by a qualified person (leading to authority approval) must be organised and paid for by the home-owner or person responsible for the site and this caused some considerable criticism.

On 6 April 2006, Part P was amended to clarify the requirements around certification of DIY work (or work completed by someone otherwise unable to self-certify) and to "make enforcement more proportionate to the risk".

The 2006 amendment made it clear that it is the responsibility of the building control authority to issue the necessary certificate (a Building Regulations Completion Certificate) once work has been completed. Any inspection required to safely issue that certificate must be determined by, and paid for by, the building control authority. This can be done "in house" or they may contract the work out to a specialist body. Although any inspections are at the expense of the building authority, notification of building work is a formal process and a building control fee is payable.

In some cases the installation of 12 V downlighters is notifiable whereas the installation of 230 V mains downlighters is not. This is because 12 V downlighters draw high currents, in comparison with a mains voltage lamp with the same power rating, and that combined with the wrong choice of cable could lead to a fire.

Additionally, whilst the Building Regulations apply equally to anyone carrying out electrical work in dwellings, without appropriate knowledge and test equipment it is not possible to ensure that the work carried out is safe. Registered Scheme members must issue appropriate certification for each job.

Another element of confusion is that the term "Special Locations" has different meanings in Part P of the Building Regulations and BS 7671 (the "Wiring Regulations").

Later revisions of part P (latest is 2013) retain the requirement to work to an appropriate standard, but have relaxed the requirements on both certification and notification for many more types of minor works, and crucially also permit a member of an approved body to inspect and 'sign off' notifiable aspects of any work of a third party such as DIYer whose work is of a suitable standard. This is intended to free up local authorities, who often do not have suitably qualified building control staff themselves. Due to uncertainty about who then becomes responsible for any hidden wiring, very few electricians are happy to sign off an installation that they have not been party to from the outset, and been able to agree stages to inspect and test before any covering in.

== See also ==
- AC power plugs and sockets: British and related types (contains more detailed history of electrical wiring styles in the UK)
- Electrical wiring in North America
- Pattress
- Technical standards in Hong Kong
