= Ring circuit =

Electrical wiring technique

In electricity supply, a ring circuit is an electrical wiring topology in which power is distributed through a continuous cable ring. Each conductor of the ring is connected to the source of the supply at both of its ends. The topology contrasts with the typical radial circuit configuration, in which nodes and the distribution point at the protective device are connected in a line or a line with branches or legs off the main line.

Ring circuits are used in distribution for power and lighting. Rings at the final consumer current draw off point either for power or lighting are known as a ring final circuit. Ring final circuits are often termed by the historical name ring main in the United Kingdom.

Ring circuits are subject to typical cable protection relating for all types of circuit topologies, in which the cable is at a higher amperage loading than the protective device's (breaker) value.

In the United Kingdom there is an anomalous ring final circuit with the cable at a lower amperage loading than the protective device. It is under a waiver, 433.1.204 in British Standards 7671.

Ring final circuits in the United Kingdom splits ring circuits into two types:

1. The 433.1.204 ring final having the cable at a lower maximum amperage rating than the protective device;
2. Ring circuits having the cable at a higher maximum amperage rating than the protective device.

== 433.1.204 ring final in the UK ==
If a circuit designed with the cable at a lower maximum amperage loading than the protective device then 433.1.204 of BS 7671 is triggered. The standard states that such a circuit must only be a ring final - not a radial or star. The 433.1.204 implementation of the ring circuit is predominately used in the United Kingdom where it was developed, and to a lesser extent in countries that adopted the British electrical standards.

The 433.1.204 ring final waiver in BS 7671 simply says in layman's terms:

1. The circuit must be a ring final (the two cable legs into the protective device double the circuits amperage rating over the cable's amperage rating);
2. Protective device must be either 30A or 32A MCB/RCBO/AFDD/fuse;
3. A minimum of 2.5mm^{2} cable used;
4. The cable must have copper conductors;
5. Minimum current capacity of the cable must be 20A, taking into account derating;
6. If socket-outlets are to be installed on the ring final they must only be the BS 1363 socket-outlet accessory family - the Type G 13A square pin plug and socket.

Further guidance for 433.1.204 is in Appendix 15 of BS 7671, recommending such as: a maximum coverage of 100 square metre floor area and that the load must be reasonably distributed around the ring final.

A ring final when designed to the 433.1.204 of BS 7671 enables the use of smaller diameter cable than used in a radial circuit of equivalent total current capacity, giving economic installation. The reduced diameter conductors in the flexible cords connecting an appliance to the plug intended for use with sockets on a ring final circuit are individually protected by a fuse in the plug. Its prime advantages over radial circuits are a reduced quantity of cable used, lower voltage drop at the furthest point of the circuit, and greater flexibility of connected appliances and equipment.

Because both ends of the ring's cable are connected to the same protective device, current can travel in two directions around the ring to reach any given load. If the load is evenly split across the two directions, the current in each direction is half of the total load, allowing the use of cable with half the total current-carrying capacity. In practice, the load does not always split evenly.

== Description ==
Diagram of a simple configuration of 433.1.204 ring final circuit. Consumer unit is at bottom left.

The ring starts at the consumer unit, also known as a Distribution board, visits each load in turn, returning to the consumer unit. The ring is fed from a fuse or circuit breaker in the consumer unit.

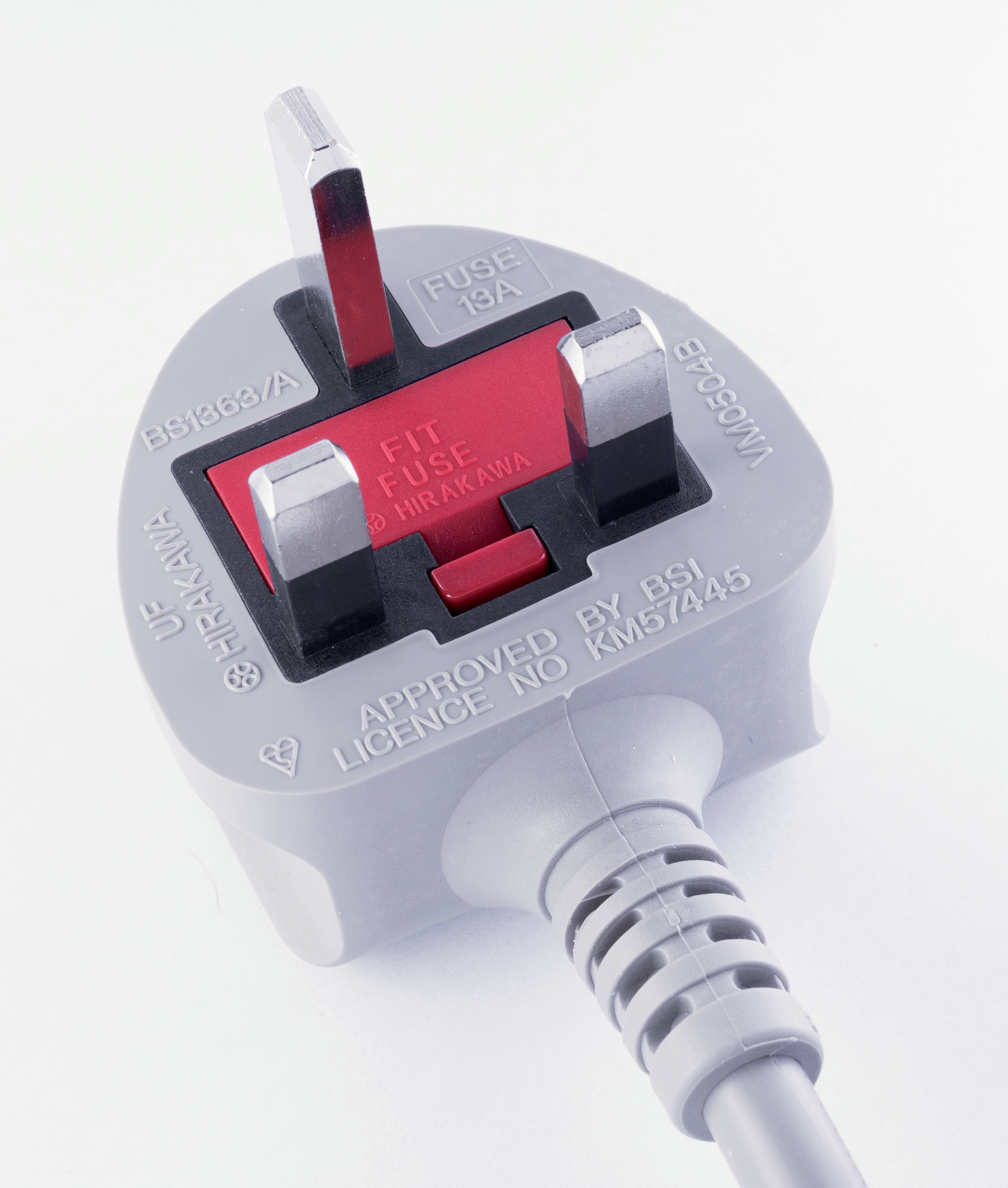
BS 1363 plug with fuse compartment visible

Ring circuits to BS 7671, 433.1.204 are commonly used in British wiring specifying only the use of socket-outlets on fused plugs to BS 1363. Because the protective device (breaker) rating is much higher than the cable's maximum amperage rating the ring final circuit can only be used with fused plugs on the socket-outlets, or 13 A fused connection units (FCU) for fixed appliances with flexible cords. 433.1.204 specifies 2.5mm^{2} cable, or 1.5mm^{2} mineral-insulated copper-clad cable, as the minimum size used and protected by a maximum of a 30A fuse or 32A circuit breaker.

== 433.1.204 ring final history ==
The ring circuit and the associated universal BS 1363 plug and socket-outlet system were developed in Britain between 1942 and 1947.

Pre-World War II practice was to use various sizes of plugs and sockets to suit the current requirement of the appliance, connected to suitably fused radial circuits. The ratings of the fuses were selected to protect both the fixed wiring and the flexible cord attached to the plug.

The Electrical Installations Committee, which was convened in 1942 as part of the Post War Building Studies programme, determined that the ring final circuit offered a greater number of sockets delivering at least 2kW to each socket, and a more efficient and lower cost circuit. Several designs for the socket-outlet system for the ring design were considered, with the new BS1363 13 A flat pin and fused plugs selected, a socket-outlet system developed independently of the final ring circuit. Of the two British Standards socket-outlet systems, the BS546 and the universal BS1363 by the 1960s BS1363 became the single standard for new radial and ring final installations.

The committee mandated the ring circuit to increase consumer safety, and estimated that using a ring circuit and single-pole fusing would reduce raw materials requirements by approximately 25% compared with pre-war standards.

The ring circuit remains the most common socket-outlet power circuit configuration in the United Kingdom. Ring final circuits are commonly used to a lesser extent in the Republic of Ireland, and were also adopted, for example, in the United Arab Emirates, Singapore, Hong Kong, Beijing, Indonesia, Cyprus, and Uganda, as well as perforce in many countries of the British Empire cum British Commonwealth. It does, however, present more complicated safety concerns than do radial circuits for plug-in solar power.

== Installation standards ==
Standards for ring final circuits that fall under BS 433.1.204 in the UK provide that the cable must be a minimum size of 2.5mm^{2} and the protective device being of 30A or 32A rating. This means that the risk of sustained overloading of the cable can be considered minimal.

British Standards 7671, 433.1.204 permit an unlimited number of 13A socket outlets to be installed on a ring circuit, with a recommendation in Appendix 15 that the floor area served does not exceed 100 m^{2}. In practice, most small and medium houses have one ring circuit per storey, with larger premises having more.

An installation designer may determine if additional circuits are required for areas of high demand. For example, it is common practice to have kitchens on their own ring circuit or sometimes a ring circuit shared with a utility room to avoid having heavy loads at one point on the main downstairs ring circuit. Since any load on a ring is fed by the ring conductors on either side of the load, it is desirable to avoid a concentrated load placed very near the consumer unit, since the shorter length of conductors will have less resistance carrying a disproportionate share of the load.

Unfused spurs from on a ring circuit wired in the same cable as the ring are allowed to run one socket (single or double) or one fused connection unit (FCU). Before 1970 the use of two single sockets on one spur was allowed, but has since been disallowed because of the popularity of double sockets. Spurs may either start from a socket on the ring or be joined to the ring cable with a junction box or other approved method of joining cables. BS 1363 compliant triple and larger sockets are always fused at 13A and therefore can also be placed on a spur. Since 1970 it is permitted to have more spurs than sockets on the ring, but it is considered poor practice by many electricians to have too many unfused spurs in a new installation.

Fused connection units (FCU) are in the BS 1363 accessories family conaining a 13A fuse. The FCU is design to supply fixed with or without flexible cables. The fuse is to protect the flex. They come in switched and unswitched versions.

Fixed appliances with a power rating of 3 kW or more (for example, water heaters and some electric cookers) or with a non-trivial power demand for long periods (for example, immersion heaters) may be connected to a ring circuit, but it is strongly recommended that instead they are connected to their own dedicated circuit. However, there are plenty of older installations with such loads on a ring circuit.

== Advantages ==
Proponents of the ring circuit point out that, when correctly installed, there are also a number of advantages to be considered.

=== Area served ===
For rooms that are square or circular, a ring circuit can deliver more power per unit of floor area for a given cable size than a simple radial circuit. The source impedance and therefore voltage drop to the furthest point is lower using a ring. To deliver the same power to the same room using radial circuits would require more circuits or heavier cable.

=== High integrity CPC ===
Safety levels are increased as all fittings on the ring are connected to the circuit protective conductor (CPC) conductor from two sides. Two independent faults are needed, one each side of a fitting or appliance to create an 'off earth' fault.

=== Continuous continuity verification from any point ===
The continuity of each conductor at all the points on the ring can be verified from any point. If this needs to be performed as part of live installation monitoring, verification can by a current clamp with the system energised.

== Disadvantages ==
The ring final circuit concept has been criticized compared to radials.

=== Fault conditions are not apparent when in use ===
Ring circuits may continue to operate without the user being aware of any problem if there are certain types of fault condition or installation errors. This gives both robustness against failure and a potential for danger.

Fault condition	Observations
Part of the ring missing or disconnected can result in 2.5mm^{2} cables running above rated current without this being obvious to the user.	Radials with a broken connection will not function (if L or N broken), or will function with no safety earth connection (if just E broken).
Inadvertent cross connection between two 32 A rings means that the fault current protection reaches 64 A and the required fault disconnection times are violated grossly.	Testing at installation can prevent this, and a similar problem applies to cross-connected radial circuits although would trip residual current protection devices if fitted to either or both radials as would be to current standards in most jurisdictions.
Spur circuits attached to the ring can overheat if not fused at the spur-point (i.e., if a BS 5733 or similar fused spur is not used)	This is almost certainly a breach of the appropriate electrical standards (e.g. BS 7671 in the UK): the maximum load on any unfused spur is a single fitting.

=== Safety tests are complex ===
At least one author claims that testing ring circuits may take 5–6 times longer than testing radial circuits. The installation tests required for the safe operation of a ring circuit are more time-consuming than those for a radial circuit.

=== Load balance required ===
Standard 433.1.204 of BS 7671 requires that the installed load must be distributed around the ring such that no part of the cable exceeds its rated capacity. In some cases this requirement is difficult to guarantee, and may be largely ignored in practice, as loads are often clustered (e.g., washing machine, tumble dryer, dish washer all next to kitchen sink) at a point not necessarily near the centre of the ring. However, the cable rating is approximately 67% that of the circuit breaker in a typical 433.1.204 32A breaker/2.5mm^{2} cable ring, which means a ring has to be significantly out of balance to create a problem.

In a ring circuit, if any poor joint causes a high resistance on one branch of the ring, current will be unevenly distributed, possibly overloading the conductor on the second leg of the ring. However, an AFDD protecting the ring should detect a loose joint if arcing occurs.

== See also ==
- Electrical wiring in the United Kingdom
