= AC power plugs and sockets: British and related types =

AC power plug and socket type

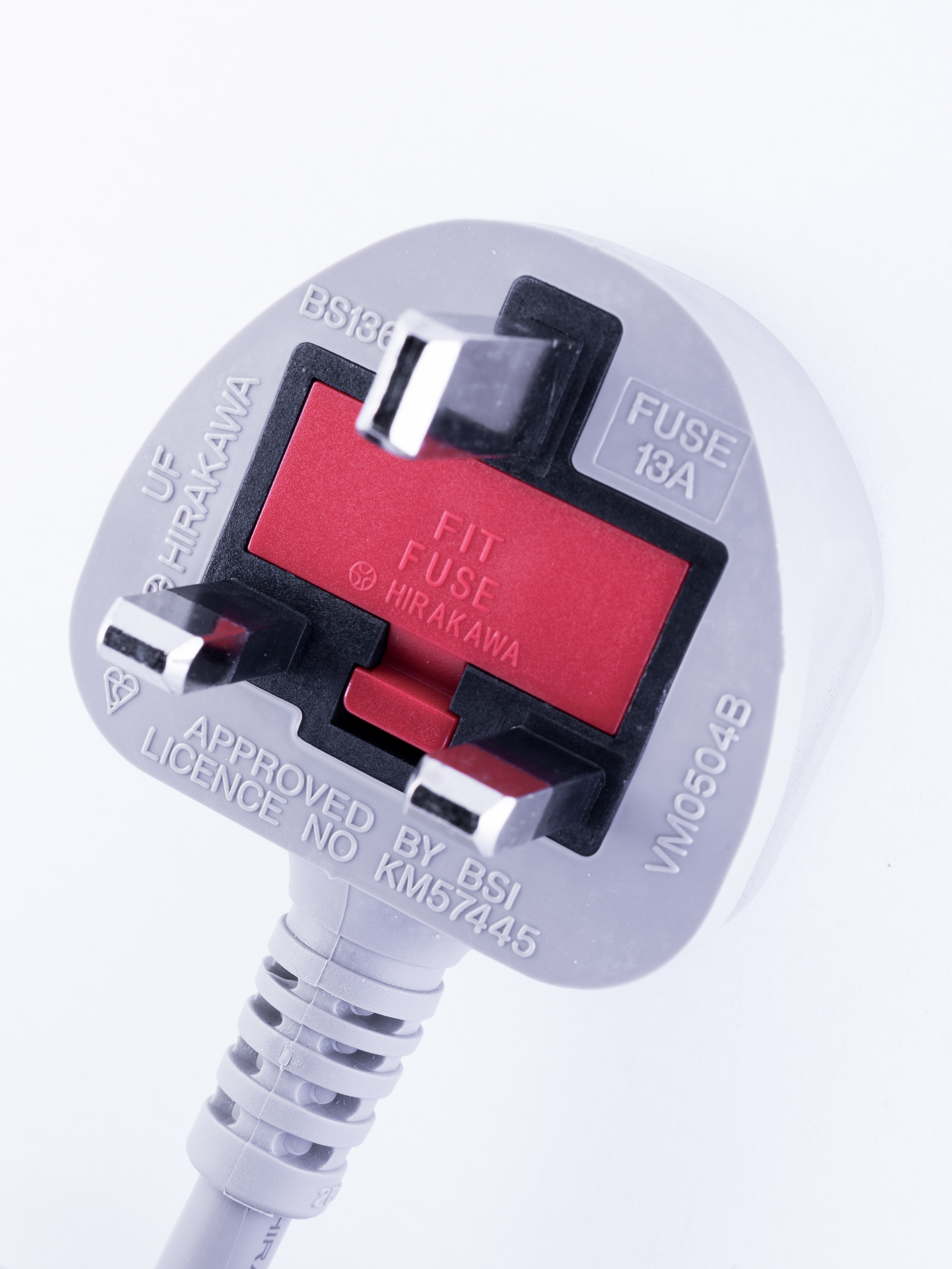
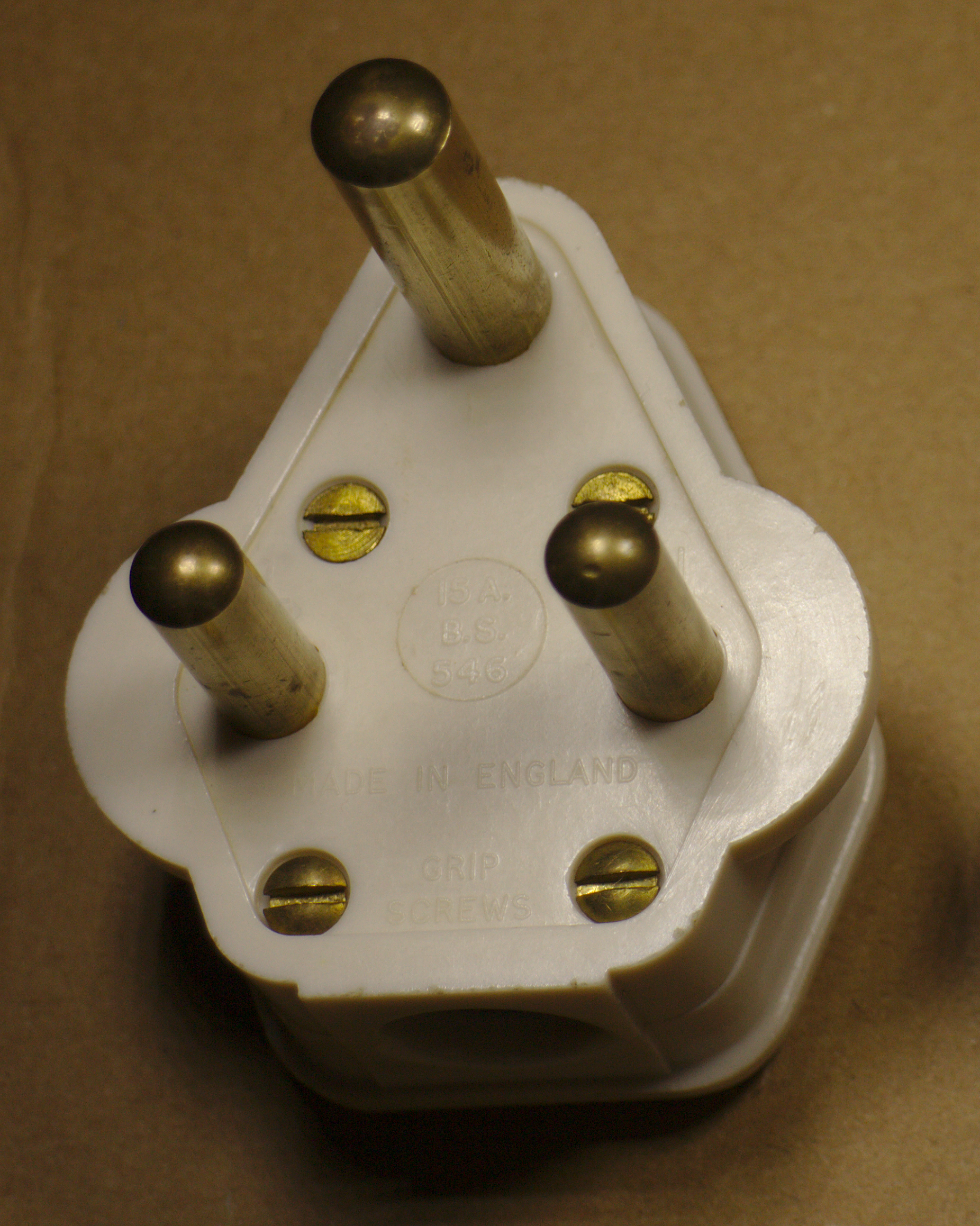
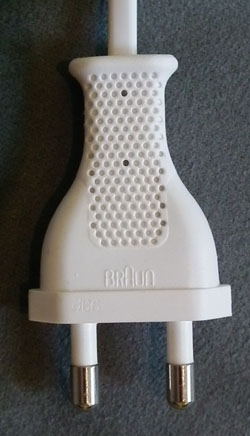
Current domestic British plug systems, from left to right: The dominant universal BS 1363; older BS 546 family of four plugs; low-power (0.2 A) BS 4573 shaver

In the United Kingdom, electrical plugs and sockets originated in the 1870s and were initially two-pin designs. These were initially sold as a mating pair, but gradually standards arose to enable the interchange of compatible devices. British Standards lists three types of socket-outlet systems primarily for domestic use:

1. The fuse-in-plug universal polarised maximum 13 A BS 1363. This family of accessories has one universal plug having a user replaceable fuse to suit the needed amperage of the appliance flex and appliance;
2. The unfused polarised BS 546. This family of socket-outlets has four plug types of differing sizes: 2 amps, 5 amps, 15 amps, and 30 amps;
3. The BS 4573 two-pin unpolarised socket and plug. This is a niche application socket-outlet used primarily for shavers and rechargeable toothbrushes.

A distinctive characteristic of the one BS 1363 socket-outlet and the BS 546 socket-outlet family are protective safety shutters behind the socket holes, and optional socket switches.

The BS 1363 universal socket-outlet plug differs from the BS 546 family by incorporating square pins rather than round pins and a user replaceable fuse from 1 A to 13 A.

The BS 1363, universal 13A socket-outlet system and connection units is the dominant type of single-phase socket-outlet system used in the United Kingdom, having only one plug type. The BS 546 socket-outlet family of four types tends to be used for niche applications, although the 5 A version has had a resurgence in switched lighting circuits. The BS 546 30 A plug has near disappeared from the UK market due to poor demand.

== Terminology ==
A plug is the movable part of a socket-outlet connector attached to an electrical device. The socket connects to the power source, either fixed on a building structure or installed on an item of electrical equipment. The plug has protruding pins (male) that fit into matching contact holes (female) in the sockets. Plug-in devices with incorporated plug pins perform other functions than connecting an appliance to a supply circuit and so are not interchangeable with plugs.

Sockets and plugs are designed to prevent exposure of bare energised contacts, to reduce the risk of users accidentally touching energized conductors. Safety features may include plug pins with insulated sleeves and sockets with blocking shutters.

The term plug is in general and technical use in all forms of English, common alternatives being power plug, electric plug, and plug top. The normal technical term for an AC power socket is socket-outlet, but in non-technical common use a number of other terms are used. The general term is socket, but there are numerous common alternatives, including power point, plug socket, wall socket, and wall plug. Modern British sockets for domestic use are normally manufactured as single or double units with an integral face plate and are designed to fit standard mounting boxes.

Electrical sockets for single phase domestic, commercial and light industrial purposes generally provide three electrical connections to the supply conductors. These are termed neutral, line and earth. Both neutral and line carry current and are defined as live parts. Neutral is usually at or near earth potential, being earthed either at the substation or at the service entrance (neutral-to-earth bonding is not permitted in the distribution board/consumer unit). Line carries the full supply voltage relative to the neutral. The protective earth connection allows the exposed metal parts of the appliance to be connected to earth, providing protection to the user should those exposed parts inadvertently come into contact with any live parts within the appliance. Historically, two-pin sockets without earth were used in Britain, but their use is now restricted to sockets specifically designated for shavers and toothbrushes.

An adaptor (in the context of plugs and sockets) is defined in IEC 60050 as "a portable accessory constructed as an integral unit incorporating both a plug portion and one or more socket-outlet portions". (There is an alternative spelling, 'adapter', but adaptor is the form usually used in standards and official documents.)

== Common characteristics ==
There are certain characteristics common to British mains plugs and sockets intended for domestic use. The brass pins appear relatively solid and large compared to other types. With the exception of BS 4573 which are round 2-pin reversible plugs and shaver socket-outlets commonly used for electric shavers and toothbrushes, British Standards for plugs specify a bottom entry flex (entry in other types is usually parallel to the axes of the pins). Since 1934, the contacts of a socket have been specified in terms of the pins of the plug, rather than by specifying the contact dimensions. The pins of both round pin and rectangular pin plugs are arranged in a triangular fashion, the earth pin being the larger and longer pin at the apex. Earthed sockets are designed to be incompatible with two-pin plugs. For both BS 546 and BS 1363 sockets, the left-hand contact is neutral and the right-hand contact is line.

== British plugs and sockets regulatory system ==
A Statutory Instrument, the Plugs and Sockets etc. (Safety) Regulations 1987, was introduced to specifically regulate plugs and sockets in the United Kingdom. This was revised by the Plugs and Sockets etc. (Safety) Regulations 1994. The guidance notes to the 1994 regulations state:

The Plugs and Sockets, etc. (Safety) Regulations 1994 (the "Regulations") were introduced to provide a regulatory regime to address issues regarding consumer safety. There were concerns that consumer safety was compromised by the substantial quantity of counterfeit and unsafe electrical plugs and sockets being placed on the UK market and also by the provision of electrical equipment without an appropriate means to connect it to the mains supply in the consumer's home.

The regulations include a requirement that all plug types must be tested and certified by a nominated approval body (normally BSI, ASTA-Intertek or NEMKO). They also require that all mains appliances for domestic use in the UK be supplied with approved BS 1363 plugs, but there is an exception for plugs fitted to shavers and toothbrushes which are normally a UK shaver plug (BS 4573) but may also be a Europlug (BS EN 50075). The regulations also contain a provision for the approval of non-BS 1363-conforming plugs when "the plugs are constructed using an alternative method of construction which provides an equivalent level of safety in respect of any risk of death or personal injury to plugs which conform to BS 1363 and is such that plugs of that type may reasonably be expected to be safe in use". Certifying bodies have used this provision by developing their own standards for novel devices, thus allowing the introduction of innovative developments; an example is the plastic ISOD (insulated shutter opening device) which was originally approved against either an ASTA Standard or the BSI PAS 003 (Note: although having a reference beginning 'PAS', PAS 003 was not a Publicly Available Specification but a BSI Product Approval Specification.)before becoming incorporated into BS 1363-1:1995 at the second amendment (AMD 14539) in 2003.

There is no European Union regulation of domestic mains plugs and sockets; the Low Voltage Directive specifically excludes domestic plugs and sockets. As such, no relevant retained EU law applies. EU countries each have their own regulations and national standards and CE marking is neither applicable nor permitted on plugs and sockets. Despite this CE marking is sometimes fraudulently used, especially on universal sockets.

== Early history ==
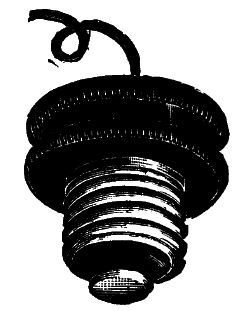
Lampholder plug from 1893 GEC (London) catalogue

When electricity was first introduced into houses, it was primarily used for lighting. As electricity became a common method of operating labour-saving appliances, a safe means of connection to the electric system other than using a light socket was needed. According to British author John Mellanby the first plug and socket in England was introduced by T. T. Smith in 1883, and there were two-pin designs by 1885, one of which appears in the (British) General Electric Company catalogue of 1889. Gustav Binswanger, a German Jewish immigrant who founded the General Electric Company, obtained a patent (GB189516898) in 1895 for a plug and socket using a concentric (co-axial) contact system.

The earthed consumer plug has several claimants to its invention. A 1911 book dealing with the electrical products of A. P. Lundberg & Sons of London describes the Tripin earthed plug available in 2.5 A and 5 A models. The pin configuration of the Tripin appears virtually identical to modern BS 546 plugs. In her 1914 book Electric cooking, heating, cleaning, etc Maud Lucas Lancaster mentions an earthed iron-clad plug and socket by the English firm of A. Reyrolle & Company. The 1911 General Electric Company (GEC) Catalogue included several earthed sockets intended for industrial use.

== British two-pin plugs and sockets ==
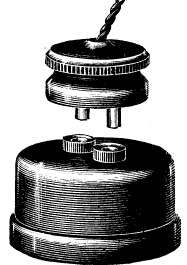
Early GEC 2-pin plug and socket as depicted in the 1893 GEC catalogue

The earliest domestic plug and socket is believed to be that patented by T. T. Smith in 1883. This was shortly followed by patents from W. B. Sayers and G. Hookham; these early designs had rectangular plugs with contact plates on either side. In 1885, two-pin plug designs appeared and in 1889 there were two-pin plugs and sockets in the GEC catalogue. The 1893 GEC Catalogue included three sizes of what was described as Double plug Sockets with capacities described not in amps, but as "1 to 5 lights", "5 to 10 lights" and "10 to 20 lights". These were clearly recognisable as two-pin plugs and sockets, but with no indication as to pin size or spacing, they were sold as pairs. The same catalogue included lampholder plugs for both BC and ES lampholders (capacity unspecified), and also a type of two-pole concentric plug and socket (similar to a large version of the concentric connectors used for laptop PC power connections) in the "1 to 5 lights" and "5 to 10 lights" capacities. Crompton and Company introduced the first two-pin socket with protective shutters in 1893, and the Edison & Swan Company was also manufacturing two-pin plug and sockets in the 1890s.

By the time the 1911 GEC Catalogue was published two-pin plugs and sockets were being offered with specifications in amps, but still with no indication as to pin size or spacing. The Midget Gauge was rated at 3 A, the Standard Gauge rated at 5 A, and the Union Gauge rated at 10 A. Also offered were two-way and three-way "T pieces" or multi-way adaptors for the 3 A and 5 A plugs, two-way only for the 10 A. Versions of the concentric plug and socket were now offered rated at 5 A and 10 A. At the same time Lundberg were offering the 2.5 A Dot, 5 A Universal, and 15 A Magnum, and Tucker were offering a range of 5 A, 10 A and 20 A plugs and sockets.

=== BS 73 ===
BS 73 Wall plugs and sockets (five ampere two-pin without earthing connection) was first published in 1915, and revised in 1919 with the addition of 15 A and 30 A sizes. By the 1927 revision of BS 73 four sizes of two-pin plugs and sockets were standardized: 2 A, 5 A, 15 A, and 30 A.

=== BS 372 ===
This was later superseded by BS 372:1930 part 1 Two-pin Side-entry Wall Plugs And Sockets for Domestic Purposes.

Following the introduction of BS 4573 in 1970 there were no longer any UK domestic uses for two-pin sockets except for shavers, so BS 372 was renamed "Two-pin Side-entry Wall Plugs And Sockets For Special Circuits" and subsequently withdrawn.

Characteristics of BS 73:1927 (BS 372:1930 part 1) two-pin plugs
Current rating	30 A	15 A	5 A	2 A
Pin diameter	0.312 inches (7.9 mm)	0.278 inches (7.1 mm)	0.200 inches (5.1 mm)	0.140 inches (3.6 mm)
Pin length	1.125 inches (28.6 mm)	0.812 inches (20.6 mm)	0.625 inches (15.9 mm)	0.500 inches (12.7 mm)
Distance between pin centres	1.25 inches (32 mm)	0.875 inches (22.2 mm)	0.656 inches (16.7 mm)	0.473 inches (12.0 mm)

=== BS 4573 (shaver plug/socket) ===
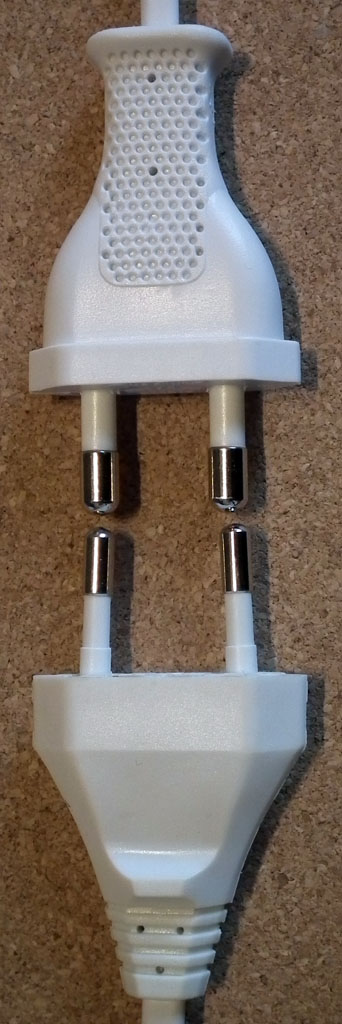
Comparison of (top) the BS 4573 shaver plug and the (bottom) Europlug

BS 4573 British Standard Specification for two-pin reversible plugs and shaver socket-outlets defines a plug for use with electric shavers. The pin dimensions are the same as those of the 5 A plug specified in the obsolete BS 372:1930 part 1 (as shown in the table above). Unlike the original, the plug has insulated sleeves on the pins. Shaver sockets are electrically separated and use induction to eliminate risk of shock for its intended use in bathrooms and washrooms. It is the only non-earthed system permitted in the UK today. Electric toothbrushes in the UK are normally supplied with the same plug. The sockets for this plug are rated at (and limited to) 200 mA (0.2 A). BS 4573 has no explicit specification for the plug rating, but Sheet GB6 of IEC 60083 states that a rating of 0.2 A applies to all BS 4573 accessories.

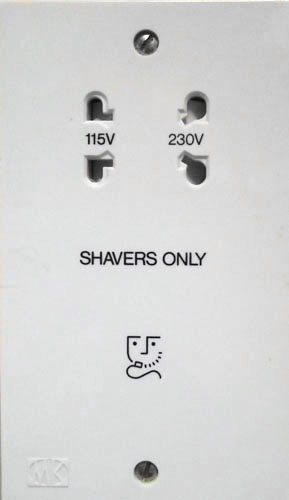
BS 4573 shaver supply unit; dual voltage and with isolating transformer

When installed in wet areas (e.g. bathrooms), for safety reasons it is normally found incorporated into a shaver supply unit which includes an isolation transformer and meets various mechanical and electrical characteristics specified by the BS EN 61558-2-5 safety standard to protect against shock in wet areas. Shaver supply units also typically accept a variety of 230 V two-pin plug types including BS 4573, Europlugs and Australian two-pin plugs. The isolation transformer often includes a 115 V output that supplies a two-pin NEMA Type A socket as well.

Shaver supply units must also be current-limited; BS EN 61558-2-5 specifies a minimum rating of 20 VA and maximum of 50 VA. BS 4573 and BS EN 61558-2-5 both require sockets to be marked with the shaver symbol defined in the IEC standard 60417-5225; the words "shavers only" are also often used but not required.

The British shaver plug looks similar to the Europlug (Type C). The BS 4573 plug has round 5.1 mm contacts, spacing 16.66 mm apart, while the Europlug has 4 mm pins converging slightly from a distance of 18.6 mm apart. The BS 4573 plug does not fit into a Schuko or Type E socket and requires an adapter.

== British three-pin (round) plugs and sockets ==
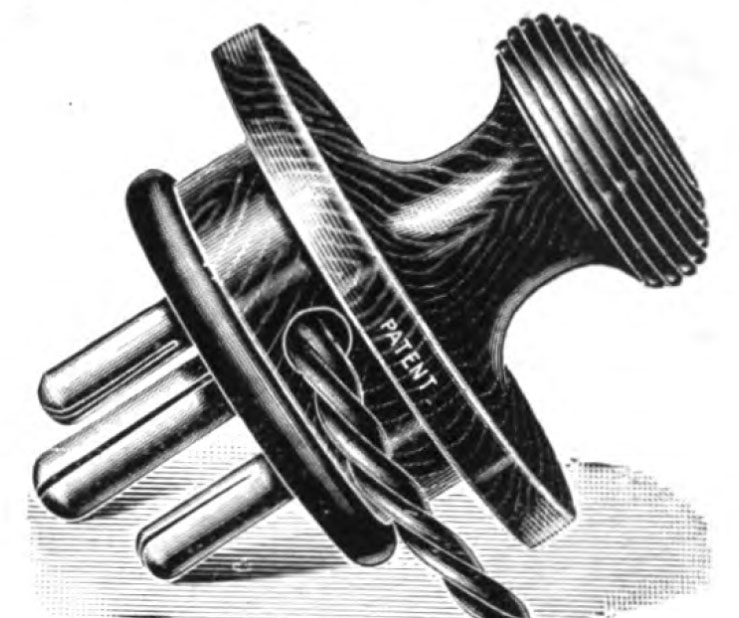
Illustration of "Tripin" three-pin earthed plug dated 1911. Note that the plug has the basic characteristics of the modern BS 546 plug, three round pins, the earth pin being longer and thicker than the other two, and with a side cable entry.

In the early 20th century, A. P. Lundberg & Sons of London manufactured the Tripin earthed plug available in 2.5 A and 5 A models. The Tripin is described in a 1911 book dealing with the electrical products of A. P. Lundberg & Sons and its pin configuration appears virtually identical to modern BS 546 plugs.

=== BS 317 ===
The first British standard for domestic three-pin plugs was BS 317 Hand-Shield and Side Entry Pattern Three-Pin Wall Plugs and Sockets (Two Pin and Earth Type) published in 1928.

=== BS 372 ===
This was superseded in 1930 by BS 372 Side-Entry Wall Plugs and Sockets for Domestic Purposes Part II which states that there are only minor alterations from BS 317.

=== BS 546 ===
In 1934, BS 372 Part II was in turn superseded by the first edition of BS 546 Two-Pole and Earthing-Pin Plugs and Socket Outlets. BS 546:1934 clause 2 specifies interchangeability with BS 372 Part II which includes the same four plug and socket sizes. (BS 372 Part I was a standard for two-pin non-earthed plugs which were never included in BS 546 and which were incompatible due to different pin spacings.)

Also in 1934 the 10th Edition of the IEE's "Regulations for the Electrical Equipment of Buildings" introduced the requirement for all sockets to have an earth contact.

Before the introduction of BS 317, GH Scholes (Wylex) introduced (in 1926) an alternative three-pin plug in three sizes, 5 A, 10 A and 15 A with a round earth pin and rectangular line and neutral pins. A fused 13 A version of this continued to be available after the introduction of BS 1363, illustrating that BS 546 was not used exclusively at any time.

Prior to BS 546, British Standards for domestic plugs and sockets included dimensional specifications for the socket contact tubes. In BS 546 there are no dimensions for socket contacts, instead they are required to make good contact with the specified plug pins.

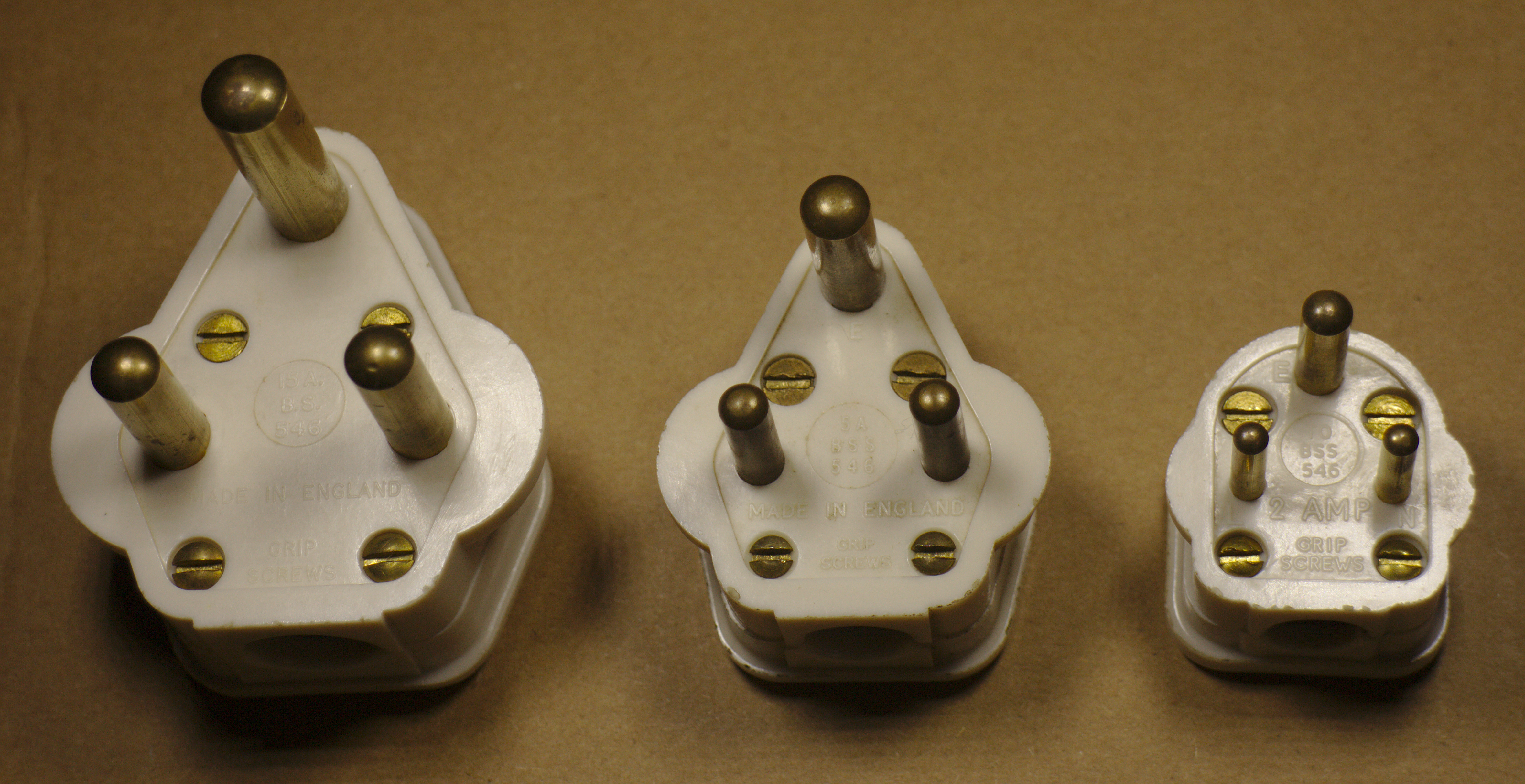
BS 546 plugs. Left to right: 15 A, 5 A, and 2 A. The first two correspond to Type M and Type D plugs respectively that are used today in former Empire territories including India and South Africa.

Although still permitted by the UK wiring regulations, BS 546 sockets are no longer used for general purposes. The type M is the largest in domestic use and is commonly used in the UK for indoor dimmable theatre and architectural lighting installations. When BS 546 was in common use domestically in the UK the standard did not require sockets to be shuttered, although many were. The current revision of the standard allows optional shutters similar to those of BS 1363. Current UK wiring regulations require socket outlets installed in homes to be shuttered.

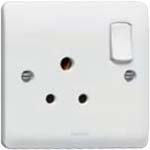
5 A switched socket-outlet to BS 546

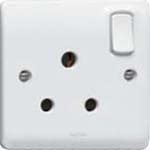
15 A switched socket-outlet to BS 546

There are four ratings of plug and socket in BS 546, 2 A, 5 A, 15 A and 30 A. Each has the same general appearance but they are different physical sizes to prevent interchangeability. They also have pin spacing which is different from the two-pin plugs specified in BS 372, so earthed plugs will not fit into unearthed sockets, and vice versa. Plugs fitted with BS 546 fuses have been optional since the original BS 546:1934 with maximum fuse ratings of 2 A in the 2 A plug, and 5 A in the 5 A, 15 A and 30 A plugs. In practice most BS 546 plugs are unfused with fused versions being unusual and expensive.

The larger top pin is the earth connection, the left-hand pin is neutral and the right-hand pin is line when looking at a socket or at the rear of a plug.

== BS 1363 three-pin (rectangular) plugs and sockets ==
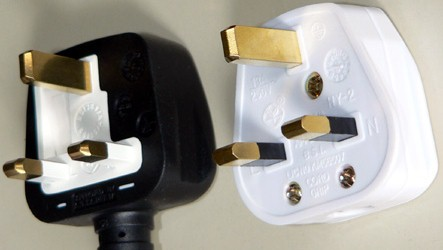
Left: a typical moulded BS 1363 plug, showing the fuse access from the underside of the plug. Right: a typical rewireable plug (before installation); the large central screw releases the cover, allowing access to the terminals and also the fuse; the two smaller screws secure an internal strain relief bar.

BS 1363 is a British Standard which specifies the common single-phase AC power plugs and sockets that are used in the United Kingdom. Distinctive characteristics of the system are shutters on the line and neutral socket holes, and a user replaceable fuse in the plug. It has been adopted in many former British overseas territories. BS 1363 was introduced in 1947 as one of the new standards for electrical wiring in the United Kingdom used for post-war reconstruction. This plug corresponds to Type G in the IEC table. BS 1363 is a newer alternative to the BS 546 plugs and sockets. The latter are still found in old installations, and in new installations for special applications such as remotely switched lighting, but BS 1363 has largely replaced them in common use. BS 1363 cannot be used for equipment requiring more than 13 A and is less commonly used for low-power portable devices (such as shavers and electric toothbrushes) and for mains-operated clocks.

Internal wiring.: 1. Cable grip; 2. Neutral terminal; 3. Earth terminal; 4. Line terminal; 5. Fuse

A BS 1363 plug has two horizontal, rectangular pins for line and neutral, and above these pins, a larger, vertical pin for an earth connection. Both line and neutral carry current and are defined as live parts. The earth pin also serves to operate the basic shutter mechanism used in many sockets. Correct polarity is established by the position of the earth pin relative to the other two pins, ensuring that the line pin is connected to the correct terminal in the socket-outlet.

BS 1363 plugs are required to carry a cartridge fuse, which must conform to BS 1362. Fuses are mechanically interchangeable; it is up to the end-user or appliance manufacturer to install the appropriate rating fuse. BS 1363 sockets must have shutters on the line and neutral contacts to prevent the insertion of a foreign object into the socket.

=== History ===
In 1941, Lord Reith, then the minister of Works and Planning, established committees to investigate problems likely to affect the post-war rebuilding of Britain. One of these, the Electrical Installations Committee, was charged with the study of all aspects of electrical installations in buildings. Amongst its members was Dame Caroline Haslett, President of the Women's Engineering Society, Director of the Electrical Association for Women and an expert on safety in the home. Convened in 1942, the committee reported in 1944, producing one of a set of Post War Building Studies that guided reconstruction.

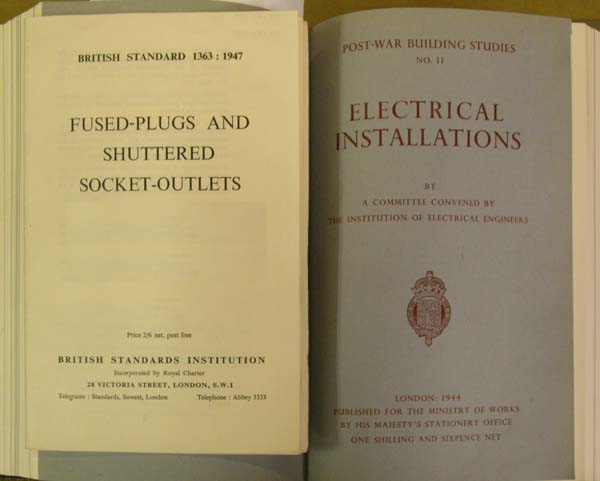
BS 1363:1947 "Fused-Plugs and Shuttered Socket-Outlets" which resulted from the report "Post-War Building Studies No. 11, Electrical Installations"

The plug and socket-outlet system defined in BS 1363 is a result of one of the report's recommendations. Britain pre-war had used a combination of 2 A, 5 A, and 15 A round pin sockets. In an appendix to the main report (July 1944), the committee proposed that a completely new socket-outlet with a user replaceable fuse in the plug to protect an appliance's flexible cord should be adopted as the "all-purpose" one socket and plug domestic standard.

The main report listed eight points to consider in deciding the design of the new standard. The first of these was stated as, "To ensure the safety of young children it is of considerable importance that the contacts of the socket-outlet should be protected by shutters or other like means, or by the inherent design of the socket-outlet." Others included flush-fitting as opposed to the 2 A, 5 A and 15 A sockets which mainly protruded from the wall being fitted on a pattress, a switch being optional, requirements for terminals, bottom entry for the cable, and contact design. The appendix added five further "points of technical detail" including requirements that plugs could not be inserted incorrectly, should be easy to withdraw, and should include a user replaceable fuse.

This requirement for a new system of plugs and sockets led to the publishing in 1947 of "British Standard 1363:1947 Fused-Plugs and Shuttered Socket-Outlets".

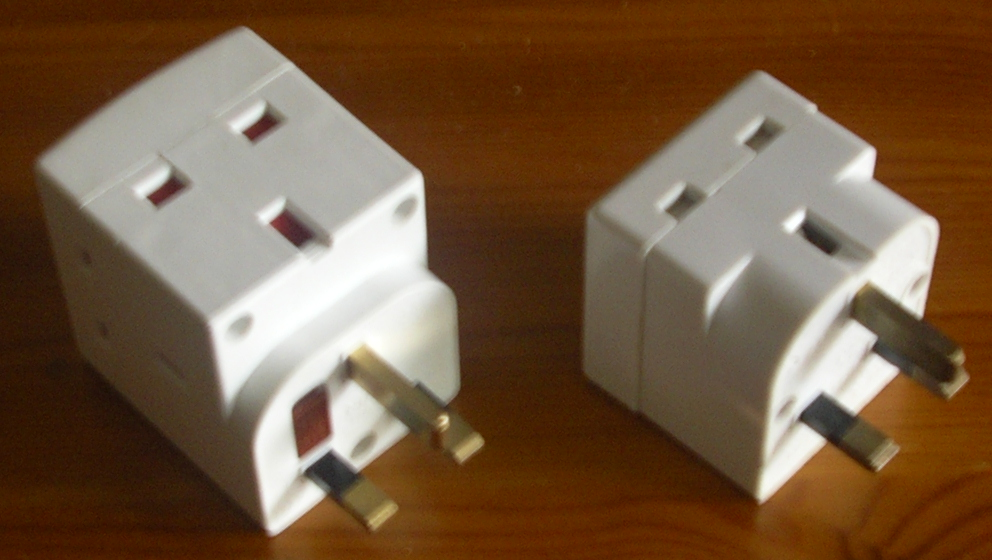
Tripler (left) and doubler (right). The tripler has a red fuse carrier visible.

One of the other recommendations in the report was the introduction of the final ring circuit system (often informally called a "ring main"). In this arrangement a cable connected to a fuse, or circuit breaker, in the distribution board was wired in sequence to a number of sockets before being terminated back at the distribution board, thus forming a final ring circuit. In the final ring circuit, each socket-outlet was supplied with current by conductors on both sides of the 'loop.' This contrasts with the radial circuit system (which is also used in the UK, often in the same installation) wherein a single cable runs out radially, like a spoke, from the distribution board to serve a number of sockets. Since the fuse or circuit breaker for a final ring circuit has to be rated for the maximum current the final ring could carry (30 A or 32 A for a breaker), additional protection is required at each socket-plug connection. Theoretically, such protection could have been designated either within the socket or within the plug. However, to ensure that this protection has a rating matched to the appliance flexible cord fitted to the plug, a fuse rated between 1 A and 13 A is incorporated into each plug. The fuse in the plug would be sized to protect the flexible cord for over-current. Wired connections may also be connected to the final ring, requiring to include a suitably rated user replaceable fuse and switch. The final ring circuit in the UK requires the use of BS 1363 plugs and sockets. However, the BS 1363 system is not limited to use with final ring circuits being suitable for radial circuits.

=== Variant pin configurations ===
Several manufacturers have made deliberately incompatible variants for use where connection with standard plugs is not acceptable. Common uses include filtered supplies for computer equipment and cleaners' supplies in public buildings and areas (to prevent visitors plugging in unauthorised equipment). Examples are one design made by MK which has a T-shaped earth pin, and the Walsall Gauge 13 A plug, which has each pin rotated 90°, the latter being in use on parts of the London Underground for 110 V AC supply, and also in some British Rail offices for filtered computer supplies.

Variant plugs

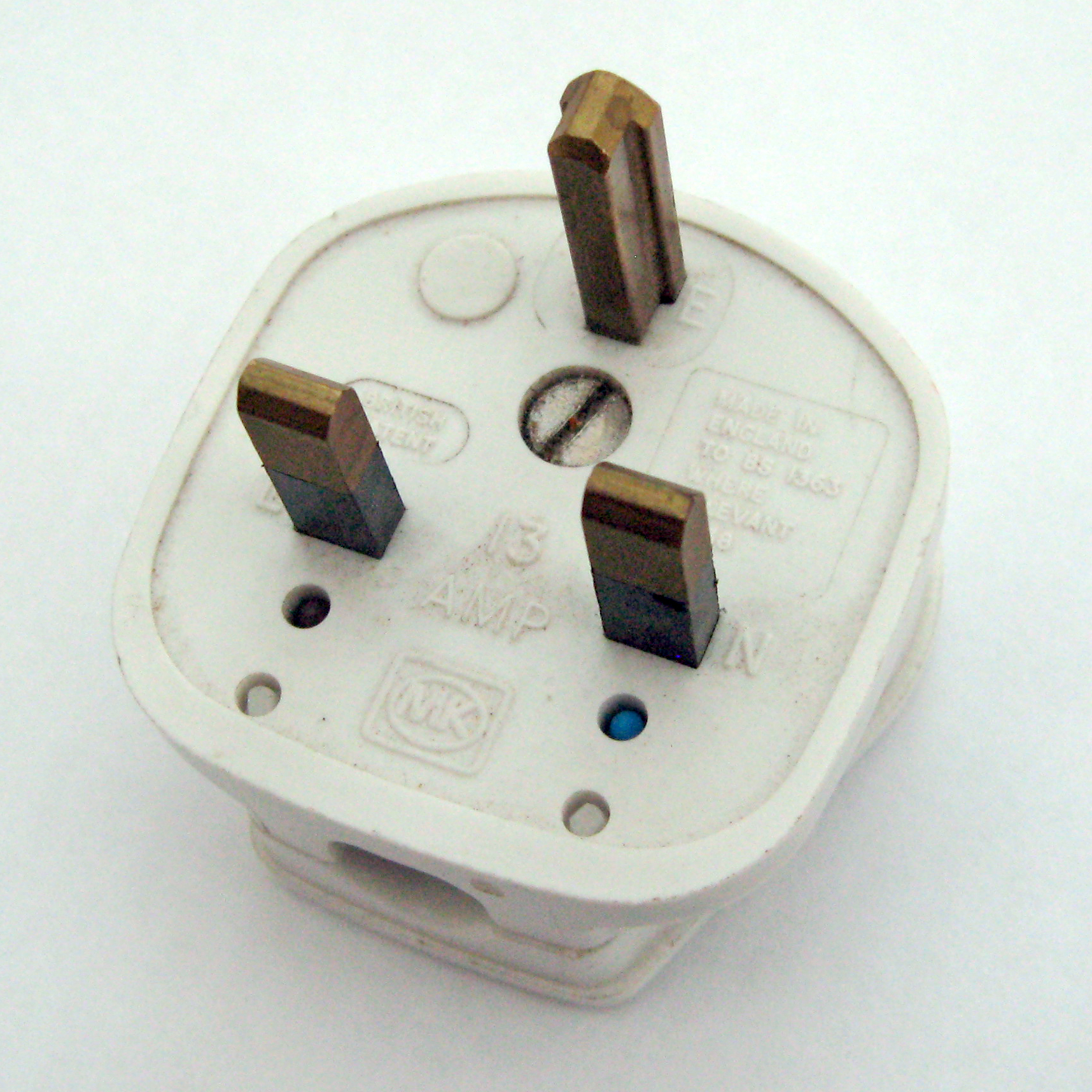
MK 13 A Plug with a T-shaped earth pin

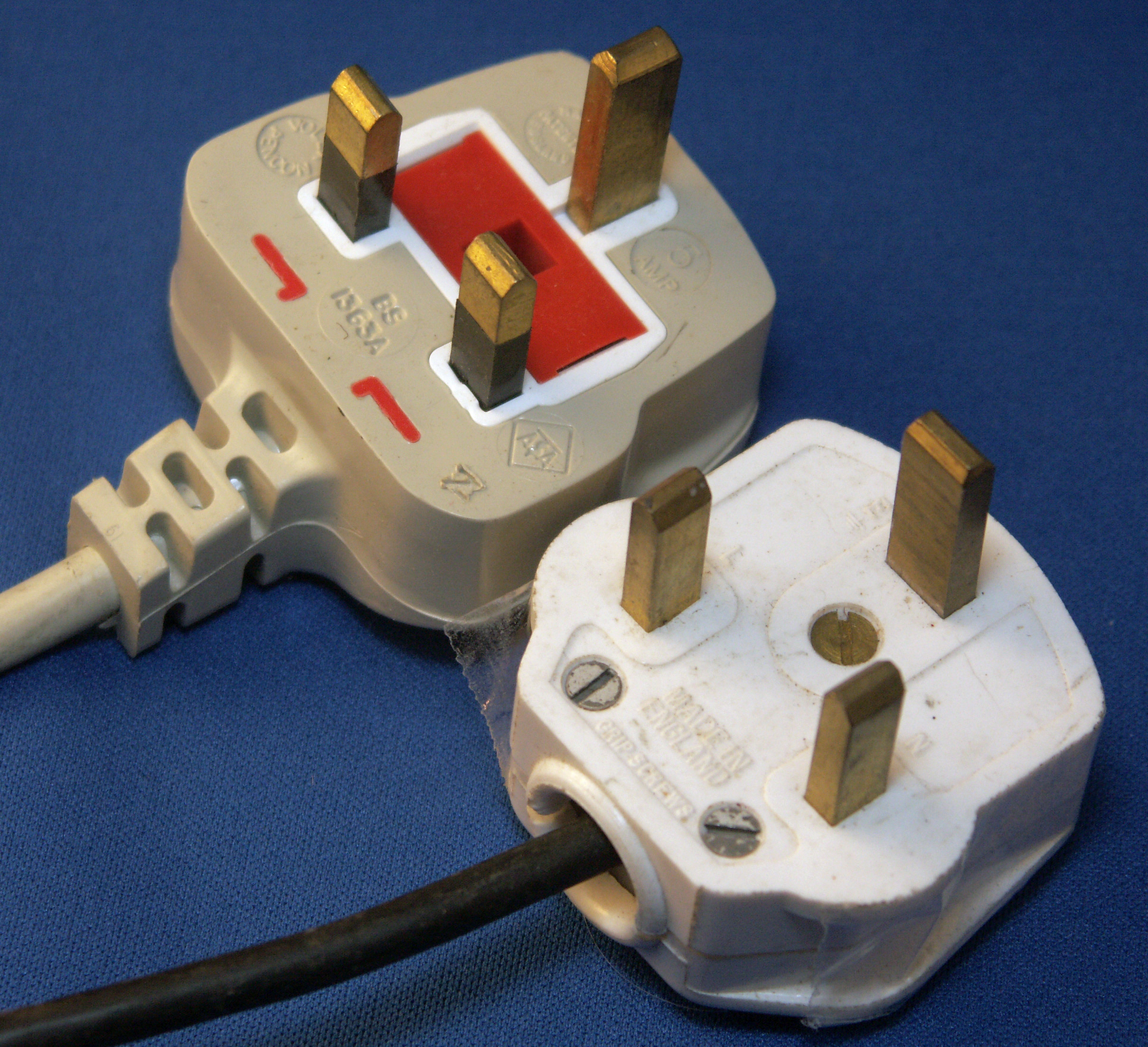
Walsall Gauge 13 A plug (bottom) compared with regular BS 1363 plug

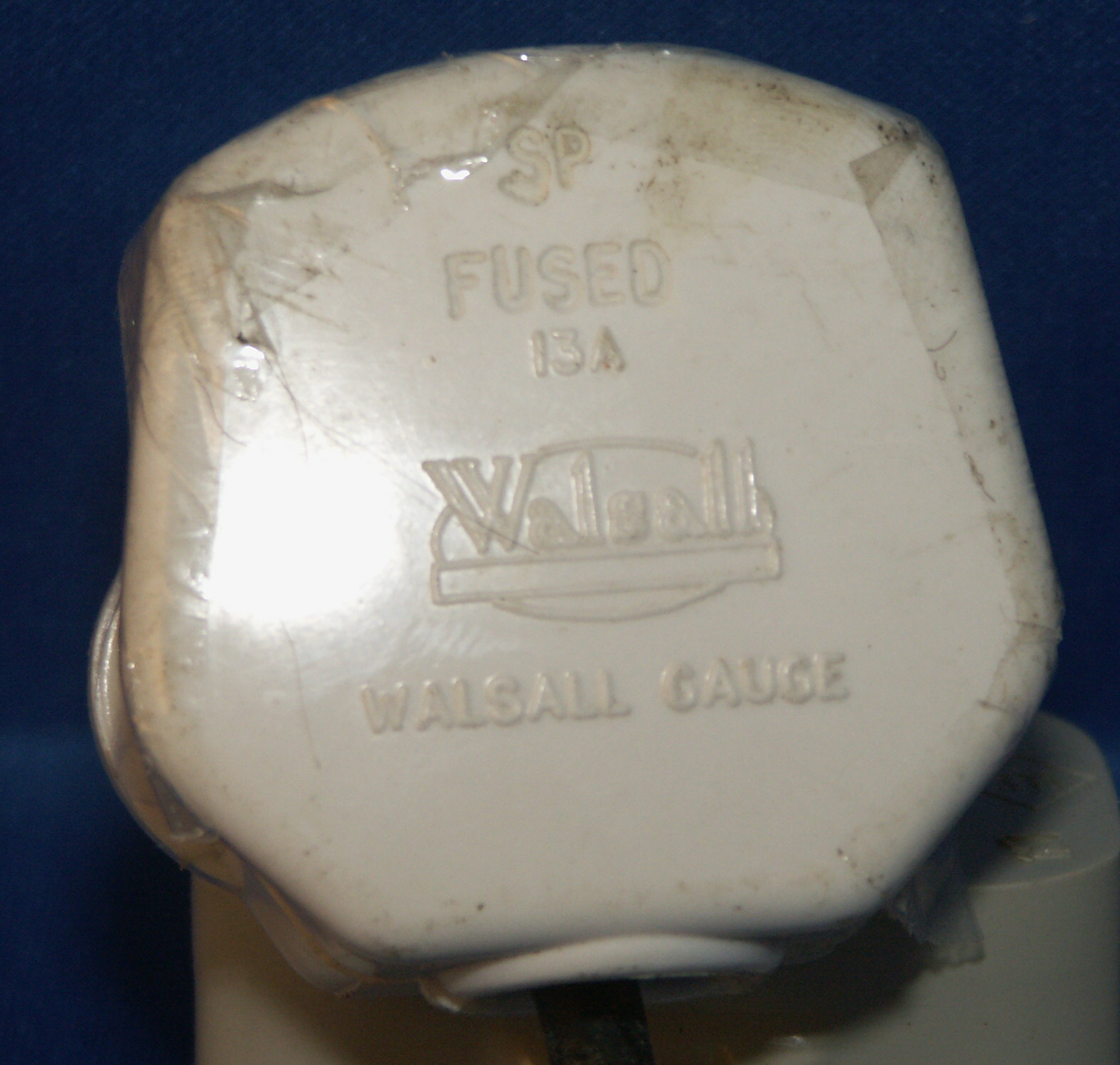
Walsall Gauge 13 A plug

== BS 8546 travel adaptors compatible with UK plug and socket system ==
BS 8546 applies to travel adaptors having at least one plug or socket-outlet portion compatible with BS 1363 plugs and socket-outlets. It was first published in April 2016 to provide a standard for travel adaptors suitable for the connection of a non-BS 1363 plug, or to a non-BS 1363 socket-outlet. It provides for an overall rating of 250 V AC, minimum current rating of 5 A, and a maximum of 13 A. Adaptors with BS 1363 plug pins must incorporate a BS 1362 fuse. BS 8546 travel adaptors may also include USB charging ports.

== British electric clock connector ==
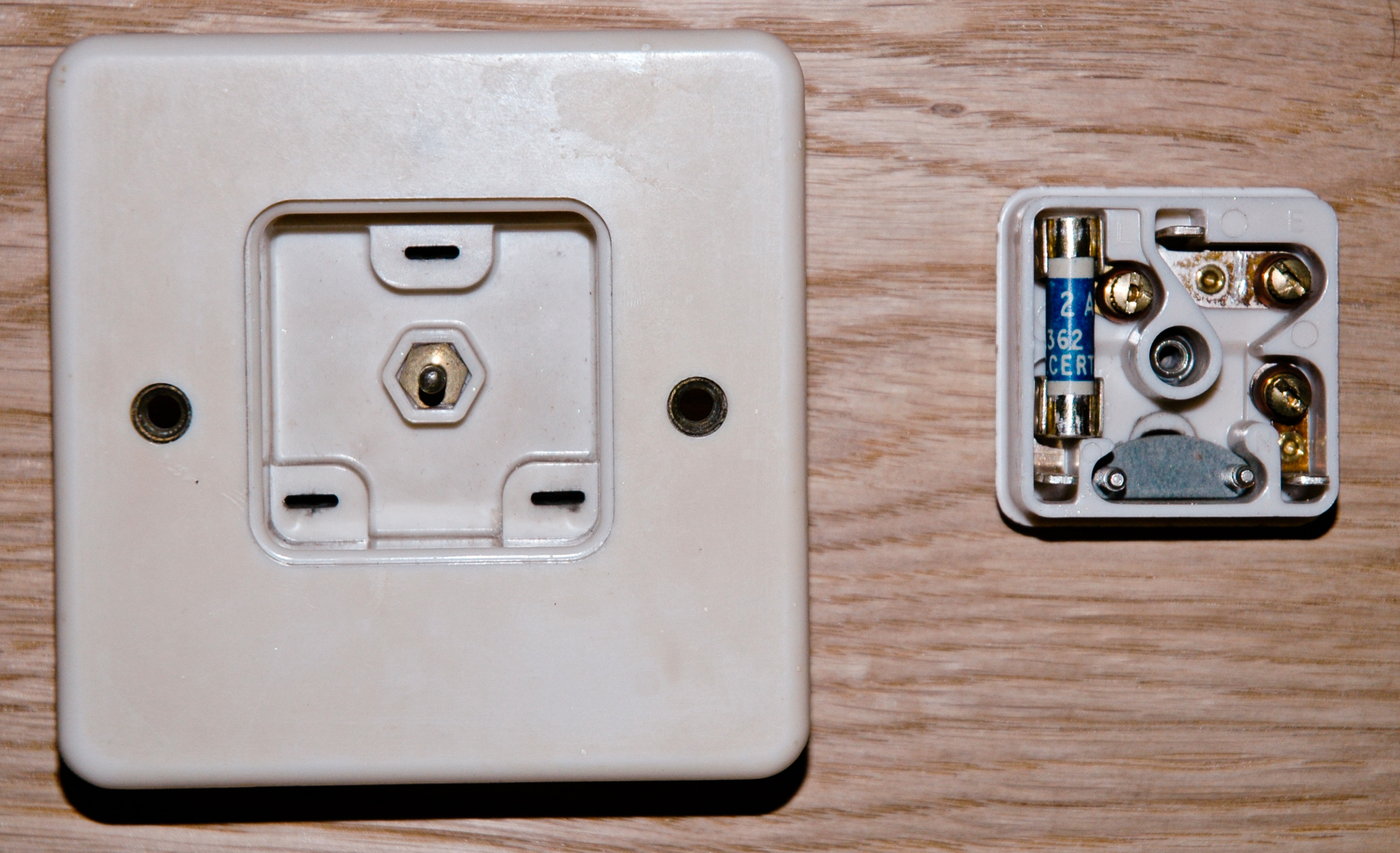
British electric clock connector, three-pin, made by MK. Showing the rear of the plug with its 2 A fuse.

Fused plugs and sockets of various proprietary and non-interchangeable types are found in older public buildings in the UK, where they are used to feed AC electric wall clocks. They are smaller than conventional sockets, commonly being made to fit BESA junction boxes, and are often of low profile. Early types were available fused in both poles; later types fused in the line only and provided an earth pin. Most are equipped with a retaining screw or clip to prevent accidental disconnection. The prevalence of battery-powered quartz-controlled wall clocks has meant that this connector is rarely seen in new installations for clock use. However, it has found use where a low profile fused connector is required and is still available. A relatively common example of such a use is to supply power to an illuminated mirror that has limited clearance from the wall.

== Obsolete non-BS types ==
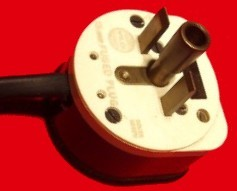
Wylex 13 A plug. Note offset line pin (top of photograph).

=== Wylex plug ===
Prior to the first British Standard for earthed plugs, George H. Scholes of Manchester introduced plugs with a hollow round earth pin between rectangular current-carrying pins in 1926 under the Wylex brand name. The Wylex plugs were initially made in three ratings, 5 A, 10 A and 15 A and were unpolarized (the current-carrying pins were on the same centre line as the earth pin). In 1933 an asymmetric polarized version was introduced, with line pin slightly offset from the centre line. In 1934 the dual plug system was introduced with the socket rated at 15 A and three sizes of plug, fused 2 A and 5 A plugs and a 15 A plug. The 15 A "dual plug" incorporated a socket with narrower apertures than a standard Wylex 15 A socket, that accepted only the narrow rectangular pins of the lower-rated plugs. The introduction of a 13 A fused plug, rated as 3 kW, enabled Scholes to propose their system as a possible solution for the new standard competing with the Dorman & Smith round pin solution, but it was not selected and the completely new BS 1363 design prevailed. Wylex sockets were used in council housing and public sector buildings and, for a short time, in private housing. They were particularly popular in the Manchester area, although they were installed throughout England, mainly in schools, university accommodation, and government laboratories. In some London schools built in the 1960s they were used as low-voltage AC sockets, typically 12 V, 5 A from a transformer serving one or more laboratories, for microscope lamps etc. Wylex plugs and sockets continued to be manufactured for several years after BS 1363 sockets became standard and were commonly used by banks and in computer rooms during the 1960s and 1970s for uninterruptible power supplies or "clean" filtered mains supplies.

=== Dorman & Smith (D&S) ===
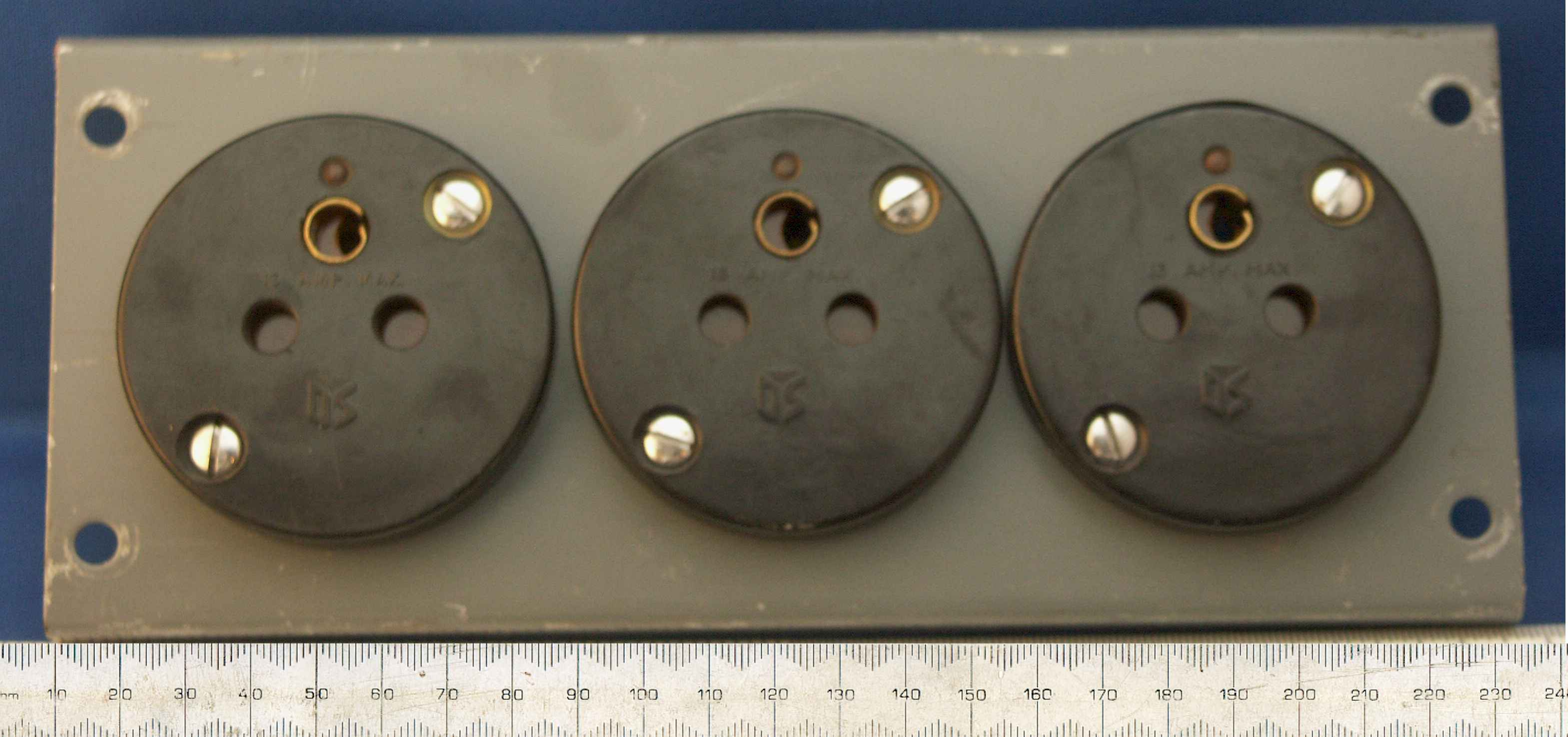
Three D&S sockets mounted on a panel

Made by Dorman & Smith (using patents applied for in 1943) the plugs and sockets were rated at 13 A and were one of the competing types for use on ring final circuits. They were never popular in private houses but were widely deployed in prefabricated houses, council housing and LCC schools. The BBC also used them. Some local authorities continued to use them in new installations until the late 1950s. Many D&S sockets were still in use until the early 1980s, although the difficulty in obtaining plugs for them after around 1970 often forced their users to replace them with BS 1363 sockets. The D&S plug suffered from a serious design fault: the line pin was a fuse which screwed into the plug body tending to unscrew in use. A fuse that worked loose could end up protruding from the socket, electrically live and posing a shock hazard, when the plug was removed.

== See also ==
- AC power plugs and sockets
- Mains electricity by country
