= Radial circuit =

Electrical wiring technique

In electricity supply design, a radial circuit is a fundamental and commonplace electrical wiring circuit arrangement in which a circuit from a distribution board simply serves a set of electrical loads, such as sockets, lights and/or fixed-appliances, with those loads connected in parallel to the supply cable in a radial fashion, somewhat like a tree branch.

A contrasting setup commonly used for socket circuits within the United Kingdom is the ring circuit design, in which the supply cable loops to each socket and then back to the distribution board.
