= Regulatory Compliance Mark =

Claim of compliance with Australian and New Zealand regulatory requirements

- The RCM symbol may be affixed to the product, its packaging, or depicted prominently on a website at a URL affixed – or encoded into a QR code affixed – to the product or its packaging.
- Standards organization: ERAC; ACMA
- Effective region: Queensland; Victoria; Western Australia; Tasmania
- Effective since: 1 March 2013
- Predecessor: A-tick; C-tick
- Product category: Telecommunications, electrical, and wireless devices
- Type of standard: Consumer
- Legal status: Mandatory
- Mandatory since: 1 March 2016
- Website: www.eess.gov.au/rcm

The Regulatory Compliance Mark (RCM) is a trademarked symbol that denotes a claim that a product is safe for use in Australia and New Zealand because it satisfies applicable regulatory requirements. These requirements comprise both the requirements under the Electrical Equipment Safety System (EESS) and the Australian Communications & Media Authority (ACMA) requirements for EMC, EME, and telecommunications and wireless devices. As of May 2024, the EESS regulates the safety of household electrical equipment in the Australian states of Queensland, Victoria, Western Australia and Tasmania.

Owned by the Electrical Regulatory Authorities Council (ERAC) – the peak body of electrical safety regulators in Australia and New Zealand – and the ACMA, RCM use is defined by AS/NZS 4417. On 1 March 2016, the RCM became mandatory and replaced ACMA's A-tick and C-tick marks. Similar to the CE mark, the RCM is not a quality indicator nor a certification mark.

== See also ==
- China Compulsory Certificate
- FCC mark
- Geprüfte Sicherheit
