= Mark (sign) =

Written or imprinted symbol used to indicate some trait of an item

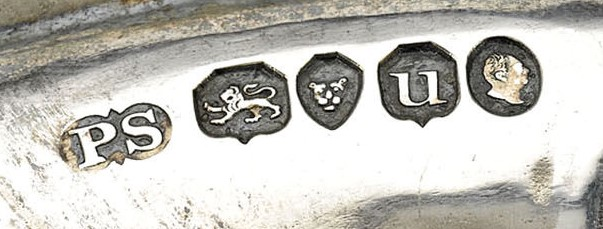
Multiple marks on silver, left to right: maker's mark (Paul Storr), lion passant (assay mark for sterling silver), London town mark, date letter (1835), duty mark (William IV)

A mark is a written or imprinted symbol used to indicate some trait of an item, for example, its ownership or maker. Mark usually consists of letters, numbers, words, and drawings. Inscribing marks on the manufactured items was likely a precursor of communicative writing. Goods made of precious metals may carry a set of official hallmarks certifying their fineness.

Historically, the marks were used for few purposes:

- declaration of the ownership (an ownership mark, for example, livestock branding);
- identification of the manufacturer and place of origin (manufacturer's mark, maker's mark, later a factory mark);
- differentiation in order to distinguish between similar items (for example, a date mark). These marks are typically useful to distributors;
- certification of the product quality (certification mark, for example, an assay mark).

Differentiation of commodity goods was documented already in the earliest administrative writing: the proto-cuneiform tablets of the late fourth millennium BC sort a single commodity into many named varieties according to its quality, composition, and the work invested in it, tracking dairy goods of differing standards and flavorings and registering around eighty kinds of fish.

In the 17th century in the English cloth trade a new class of marks was created, now called trademarks: the cloth was required to contain both the maker's mark (initials of the maker) and the mark of the clothier, indicating the capitalist who furnished the capital for the production.

In the US commercial law, "mark" means either a trademark, a service mark, a collective mark, or certification mark. French Intellectual Property Code defines a mark as "a sign likely to be graphical representation" of the maker.

== Ownership marks ==
Ex libris of Hayashi Razan

The ownership marks (at the time simultaneously the maker's) are the oldest ones (per Rabelais, "the sense of ownership of his works is as natural to man as laughing"). Some researchers claim that the decorations found on the shells of ostrich eggs in South Africa and dating back 60,000 years are marks of the owner.

Livestock branding is known for thousands of years (the Code of Hammurabi mandated it almost 4000 years ago); other forms of signs indicating ownership are monograms and heraldic symbols. Medieval merchants applied their personal marks to bales and casks to show whose property they were during shipment and storage. In England the older, rune-like merchant's marks began to fall out of use in the 16th century, when the King of Arms started granting coats of arms to merchant guilds. Libraries use ownership marks in the form of bookplates, rubber stamps, embossed seals.

== Manufacturer's marks ==
The manufacturer's marks are quite old: the first maker's marks found on Korakou culture pottery are four thousand years old, and the ones on ancient Greek and Roman vases date back to 5th-4th centuries BC. Competition among Greek pottery workshops drove makers to sign their wares and sometimes to add short texts about themselves; one cup from Rhodes assured the drinker of the favor of Aphrodite. Under the Roman Republic a mark might consist of little beyond a date, but by the imperial era building bricks, oil lamps, and metal tools commonly carried the maker's name, details of the workshop and its owner, and frequently a small image, while marks on wine and cheese told the buyer where the foodstuff originated. An early example of a written commodity mark is a small wooden tag, pierced for attachment, recovered from a royal tomb at Abydos and dated to about 3000 BC: it records a set amount of high-grade oil from the Tjehenu region (near modern Libya) along with the individual oil press that produced it, the press name possibly serving as a further guarantee of the product's standard. While the production marks are technically distinct from the ownership marks, in the ancient times, when a craftsman typically was the same person as the merchant, and many people were illiterate, a single mark frequently served both purposes.

In Song dynasty China (960–1279), where the state required producers to stamp their names on their goods, the Liu family needle shop of Jinan wrapped its sewing needles in printed labels showing a white rabbit, matching the stone rabbit that stood by the shop's door; the text vouched for the fine steel of the needles and invited customers to find the store by looking for the rabbit. Aimed at buyers who were mostly unable to read, the rabbit emblem has been called the oldest surviving example of a marketing brand, and its copper printing plate is held by the National Museum of China.

The rise of factory marks (at the expense of the marks of actual makers) was occurring in many industries since the 17th century, De Munck links this to changes in the labor relations and methods of production (molds for earthenware, for example, reduced potters to low-skilled laborers). In the modern precious-metal hallmarking, this mark might identify an entity that submitted the item for assaying (not necessarily the manufacturer), so the official term is the responsibility mark (or sponsor's mark in the UK and Ireland).

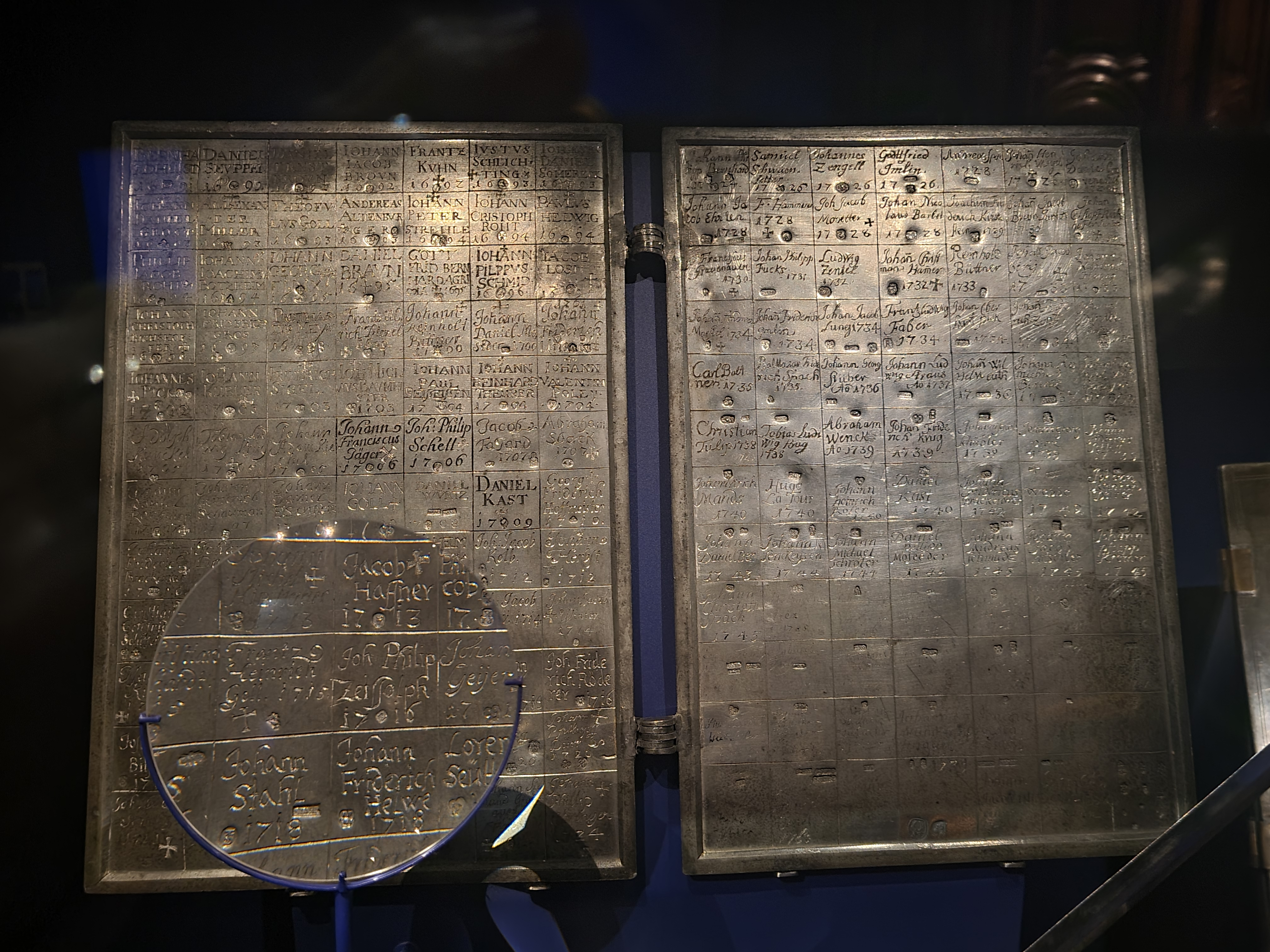
Plaques with the names of silversmiths inducted into the Strasbourg guild and their registered marks

The distinction between the factory marks and trademarks in England became clear by the 17th century in the cloth trade: the manufacturer marks (initials of the maker weaved into the cloth) were required from the producers by regulations and represented a liability, while the trademark (mark of the clothier) represented the goodwill, an asset, not of the actual craftsman, but of the capitalist who furnished the capital for the production.

== Certification marks ==
FCC Mark

Medieval guilds set up the system of compulsory ("regulatory") marks for the craftsmen, intended to trace the defective items and punish the offenders, with most typical examples provided by the bakery trade. England first forced producers to mark their goods in 1266, when every loaf of bread was required to have a baker's mark or seal, to enforce regulations of the rules on weight or price could. In the bad cases the offenders were banished from the trade for life. In English weapons manufacturing (including cutlery) the regulations concerning the manufacturer marks were firmly established in the 14th century: no weapon shall be sold without a personal mark of the craftsman, misuse of the mark was subject to court actions.

== Marks on ceramics ==
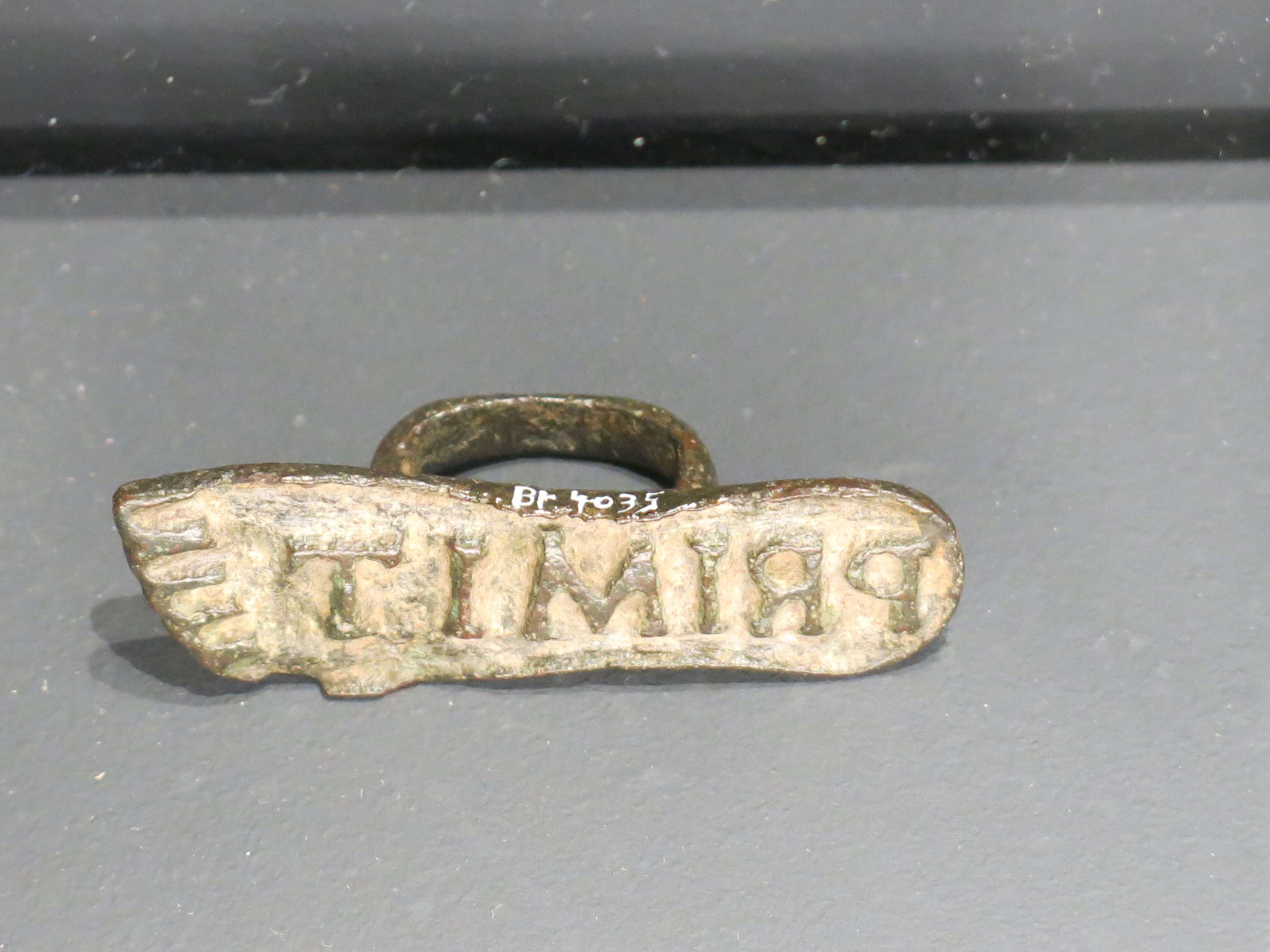
Signaculum PRIMIT ("first")

While occasionally the marks were directly etched onto ceramic objects, the nature of the manufacturing process was amenable to the use of seals. The oldest stamp seals were button-shaped objects with primitive ornamental forms chiseled onto them.

The habit of closing containers under a stamped lump of clay goes back to the late seventh millennium BC in the Middle East. The practice paired a durable stamp, typically cut from stone with a recessed design, with damp clay pressed over the fastening of a pot, basket, or sack, so that the clay simultaneously secured the container and took a positive copy of the design. When the Neolithic village now known as Tell Sabi Abyad in northern Syria burned down around 6000 BC, the fire preserved hundreds of such sealings; most lay together in one non-domestic building at the heart of the settlement, suggesting that after being detached they were kept as an archive documenting past exchanges. The stamp seals of the Halaf period (c. 6000–5000 BC) had holes so they could be worn on the body, and served their owners as amulets; according to Petr Charvát, this amuletic role is what made them effective guardians of goods, the seal transferring something of its owner's person to the marked item through a kind of sympathetic magic. The seal is also the oldest device known to have allowed a craftsman's image to be replicated mechanically.

In the fourth millennium BC, Sumerians introduced cylinder seals that had to be rolled over the soft clay to leave an imprint. During the Uruk expansion of the later fourth millennium BC, engraved cylinders were run across the wet clay stoppers of liquid containers turned out on the fast wheel to uniform shapes and volumes; the form of some of these vessels suggests they were shaped to show off the resulting band of impressions. The archaeologist David Wengrow interprets the impressions as guarantees of where a product came from and how good it was, and argues that this combination of sealing with uniform packaging amounts to commodity branding five millennia before the modern brand.

From the 12th century BC the previous designs were largely abandoned in favor of amphora stamps. Romans introduced their signacula, true manufacturer's marks, around the first century BC; Byzantine maintained the tradition in their commercial stamps.

== See also ==
- Mark (designation), a type of version number

== Sources ==
- Di Palma, Salvatore (2015). The History of Marks from Antiquity to the Middle Ages. Société des écrivains.
- Schechter, Frank Isaac (1925). The Historical Foundations of the Law Relating to Trade-marks. New York: Columbia University Press. ISBN 978-1-58477-035-0. OCLC 41951335.
- Semprini, Andrea (1995). La marque (in French). Paris: Presses Universitaires de France - PUF. ISBN 2-13-047053-X.
- Greenberg, Abraham S. (December 1951). "The Ancient Lineage of Trade-Marks". Journal of the Patent Office Society. 33 (12): 876–887 – via HeinOnline.
- Jones, S. (2002). "Trademark". Encyclopedia of New Media: An Essential Reference to Communication and Technology. SAGE Publications. pp. 440–441. ISBN 978-1-4522-6528-5.
- Stevens, Rolland E. (1956-11-01). "Loss of Books and Library Ownership Marks". College & Research Libraries. 17 (6). American Library Association: 493–496. doi:10.5860/crl_17_06_493. hdl:2142/36801. ISSN 2150-6701.
- De Munck, Bert (December 2012). "The agency of branding and the location of value. Hallmarks and monograms in early modern tableware industries". Business History. 54 (7): 1055–1076. doi:10.1080/00076791.2012.683422. eISSN 1743-7938. ISSN 0007-6791. S2CID 218587496.
- Brown, Brian A.; Feldman, Marian H. (2013). Critical Approaches to Ancient Near Eastern Art. Walter de Gruyter. ISBN 9781614510352.
- Vikan, Gary (1991-01-01). "Stamps, Commercial". The Oxford Dictionary of Byzantium. Oxford University Press. doi:10.1093/acref/9780195046526.001.0001. ISBN 978-0-19-504652-6.
- Wengrow, David (2008). "Prehistories of Commodity Branding". Current Anthropology. 49 (1): 7–34. doi:10.1086/523676.
- Petty, Ross D. (2024). From Marking Products to Marketing Brands: A Legal Perspective on the History of Brand Marketing. Palgrave Studies in Marketing, Organizations and Society. Palgrave Macmillan. doi:10.1007/978-3-031-76778-4. ISBN 978-3-031-76777-7.
- Goldsmiths' Company Assay Office. "What is a Hallmark?".
- Hallmarking Convention. "Glossary".
