= UKCA marking =

Declaration of conformity with British standards

- Standards organization: Department for Business and Trade
- Effective region: Great Britain
- Effective since: 31 December 2020
- Predecessor: CE marking
- Product category: Various
- Legal status: Optional alternative to CE marking
- Website: gov.uk/guidance/using-the-ukca-marking

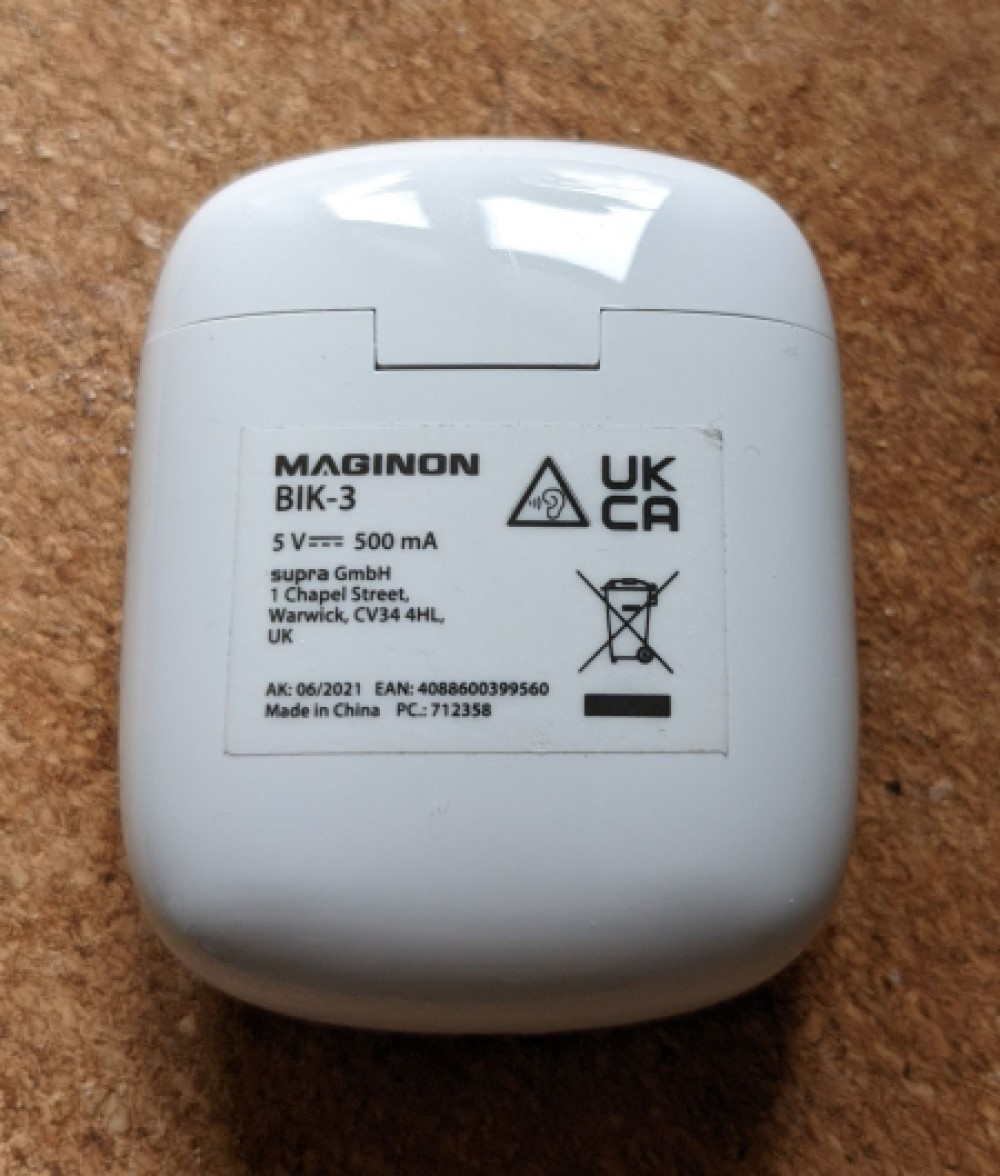
An earbud case with the UKCA conformity mark

The UKCA marking (an abbreviation of UK Conformity Assessed) is a conformity mark that indicates conformity with the applicable requirements for products sold within Great Britain. The government originally intended that it should replace the CE marking for products sold in Great Britain, initially from 2022, but marking requirement was delayed, then effectively made optional for most items that are CE marked.

== Applicability of UKCA and CE marks ==
The UKCA marking became part of UK law at the end of the Brexit transition period, on 31 December 2020, with the coming into force of the Product Safety and Metrology etc. (Amendment etc.) (EU Exit) Regulations 2019 (SI 2019/696), which was intended to replace the CE marking. The UKCA marking was also intended to replace the "reversed epsilon" marking used on aerosol sprays and measuring container bottles.

The scope and procedures of the UKCA scheme initially followed those for CE marking. In 2019, the (then) government said that the two schemes may diverge after 31 December 2020. Initial guidance regarding UKCA marking was originally published by the government in 2019, ahead of a potential no-deal Brexit but was subsequently withdrawn.

The government planned for UKCA compliance to be a mandatory requirement from then, but the CE mark was accepted as an alternative, initially for the transition period until 1 January 2022. This deadline for including the UKCA mark was extended to 1 January 2023, then to 31 December 2024.

On 1 August 2023 the government effectively withdrew the requirement for UKCA, and stated that the CE mark remains acceptable for most goods as a valid sign of conformance.

On 2 September 2024, the government announced that the CE marking for construction products will continue to be accepted until it announces otherwise (with a minimum of two years notice). At the time of the announcement, the deadline for construction products was 30 June 2025.

== Characteristics of UKCA marking ==
The height of the UKCA marking must be at least 5mm; it may be larger so long as the proportions are kept. The marking should be "easily visible, legible, and permanently attached to the goods".

The government also intends to bring additional flexibility regarding the placement of the UKCA marking. This may allow the marking to be placed in an accompanying document or sticky label instead, despite the permanent extension of the CE marking in the UK.

Additionally, the Fast-Track UKCA Process will be put into place where businesses may put the UKCA marking under the UK regulations or the CE marking under the EU directives. It is not intended to be a mandatory process.

== Northern Ireland ==
UKNI marking used to supplement CE marking for goods released on to the NI market

The UKCA marking only applies to products placed on the market in Great Britain. In Northern Ireland, a part of the United Kingdom that remains aligned to the European Single Market due to the Northern Ireland Protocol, CE marking continues to be required. UK-resident bodies are no longer qualified to carry out CE mark conformity assessments for goods intended for the EU, but under the Northern Ireland Protocol they may do so for Northern Ireland. Where a UK body has carried out the assessment for goods intended for Northern Ireland, the product should display both the CE mark and a UKNI mark (sometimes also called UK(NI)). However, goods intended for export to the EU must be assessed by an EU-resident body and carry a CE mark (and must not carry the UKNI mark). (Note: With that exception, it remains permissible in the UK, the EU and most other jurisdictions for products to carry multiple conformance marks (such as FCC mark, CCC mark etc.).)

As part of the British Government's policy of "unfettered access" for "qualifying Northern Ireland goods" (Note: Defined in The Definition of Qualifying Northern Ireland Goods (EU Exit) Regulations 2020.) to be sold in Great Britain without restriction, goods may be sold in Great Britain using the relevant Northern Ireland markings and without any additional approvals that would be required for the UKCA marking.

== Accepted markings on each market ==
Market	Accepted marking(s)
Goods placed on the market in Great Britain	CE or UKCA
Goods placed on the market in Northern Ireland	CE (if using an EU notified body); CE and UKNI (if using a UK conformity assessment body) (Note: If the UKNI marking is used, it must be used alongside the CE marking, and may not be placed on the EEA market. In other words, it is not permissible to use the UKNI marking alone and any product with the UKNI marking cannot be exported to the EEA.)
Qualifying goods from Northern Ireland placed on the market in Great Britain	CE, or CE and UKNI
Goods placed on the market in the European Economic Area	CE (Note: The UKCA or other conformity mark(s) may appear alongside this but the UKNI mark must not appear on goods intended for the EEA market)

== See also ==
- Registration, Evaluation, Authorisation and Restriction of Chemicals#In non-EU countries for the proposed "UK REACH".
- European Committee for Standardization and European Committee for Electrotechnical Standardization: the UK remains a member of these European Standards bodies.
- Kitemark - an early British service quality trademark by the British Standards Institute, first implemented in 1903
- "Not for EU" - a label shown on some UK food products to allow them into Northern Ireland, but not the EU, introduced in 2023
