= Geprüfte Sicherheit =

German product safety certification mark

GS mark

The Geprüfte Sicherheit ('Tested Safety') or GS mark is a voluntary certification mark for consumer products. It indicates that a product meets German and, if available, European safety requirements for such devices. The main difference between GS and CE mark is that the compliance with the European safety requirements has been tested and certified by a state-approved independent lab. CE marking, in contrast, is issued for the signing of a declaration that the product is in compliance with European legislation. The GS mark is based on the German Product Safety Act (Produktsicherheitsgesetz, or ProdSG).

Testing for the mark is usually conducted by authorized laboratories such as IFA and TÜV in Germany; IMQ in Italy; NEMKO in Europe and Underwriters Laboratories in the United States.

Although the GS mark was designed with the German market in mind, it appears on a large proportion of electronic products and machinery sold elsewhere in the world.

== See also ==
- CE mark
- UL mark
