= Not for EU =

UK food label

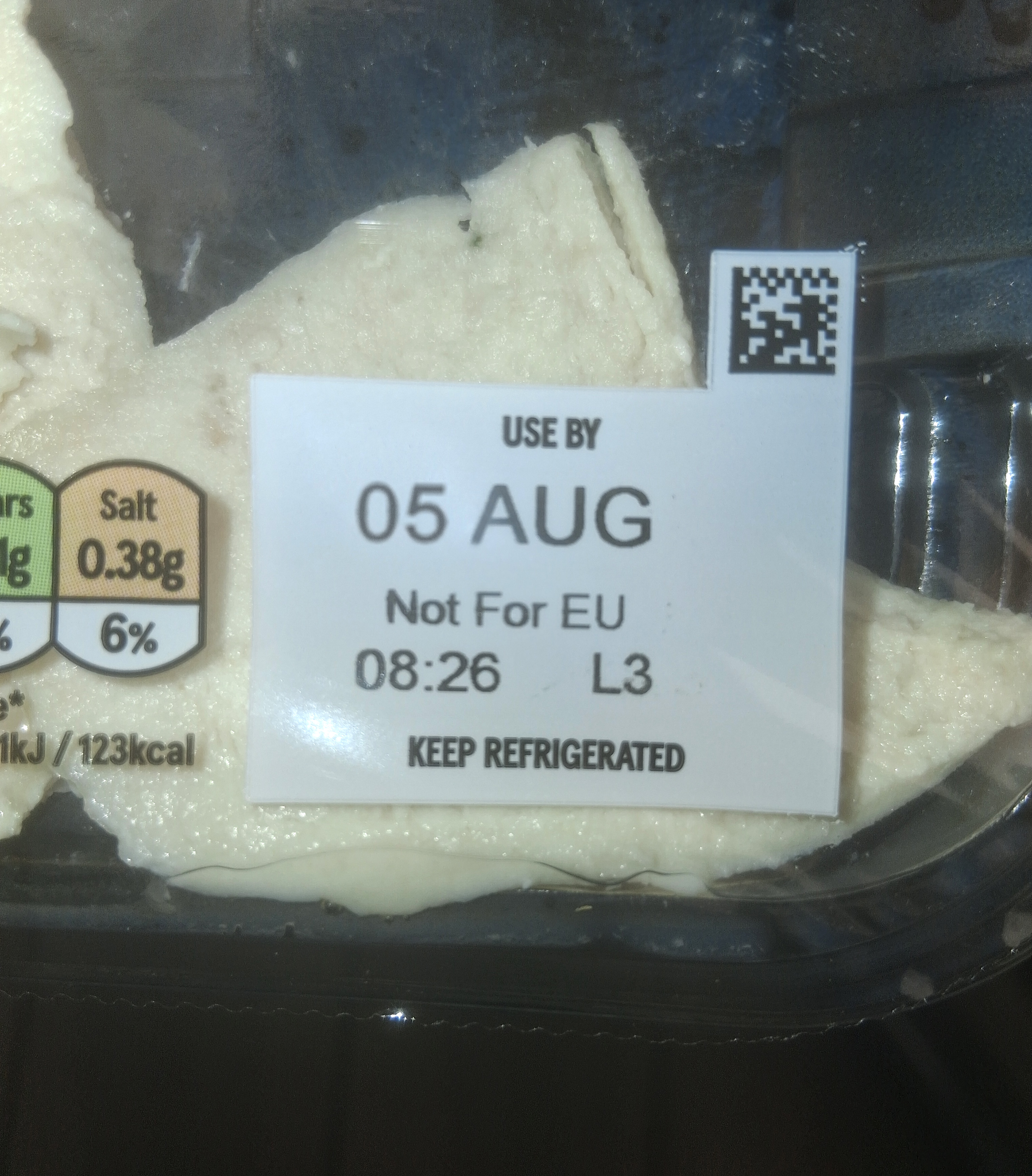
- A "Not for EU" label on a chicken product in July 2025
- Standards organization: Defra
- Effective region: UK
- Effective since: October 2023 (Note: Although officially introduced in October 2023, the label was seen in NI supermarkets as early as August 2023.)
- Product category: Certain food products

The "Not for EU" label is a designation attached to the packaging of certain food products sold in the United Kingdom (UK). Introduced in 2023, it allowed foodstuffs that comply with UK food standards to enter Northern Ireland from Great Britain, (Note: That is, England, Scotland and Wales) without further need to demonstrate compliance with European Union (EU) standards. Under the terms of the protocol annexed to the Brexit withdrawal agreement, Northern Ireland is a part of the EU single market for goods and EU product standards normally apply. The label indicates that the product may be sold in Northern Ireland but not lawfully be sold in the EU.

== Meaning ==
The presence of the "Not for EU" label indicates that the product is not declared to conform to EU standards and thus may not legally be sold in the EU. Goods manufactured in the United Kingdom – including Northern Ireland – continue to be exported to the EU provided that they do meet EU standards.

The labelling is intended to ensure that goods entering Northern Ireland from Great Britain require only minimal checks under the Northern Ireland Retail Movement Scheme (NIRMS), provided that they do not end up for sale in the EU. Visitors from the EU may buy products with the label and take them home, but may not resell them. The label may also be used on goods imported to the UK, whether from the EU or any other country.

== Background ==
The labelling is a consequence of Brexit, specifically the Johnson government's decision to resolve the Brexit trilemma by keeping an open trade border on the island of Ireland. (Note: The "Brexit Trilemma" is summarised as: no hard border on the island; no customs border in the Irish Sea; and no British participation in the European Single Market and the European Union Customs Union. It is not possible to have all three.) This resulted in the Northern Ireland Protocol in the Brexit withdrawal agreement. Consequently, since Brexit, Northern Ireland remains a part of the EU single market for goods, meaning that (in general) goods from Great Britain intended for sale in Northern Ireland are required to comply with EU regulations, even if these differ from UK regulations.

== Implementation and expansion ==
The "Not for EU" label was first announced in February 2023 after the UK government reached an agreement with the EU. Although it was officially introduced in October 2023, the label was first spotted at Asda supermarkets in Northern Ireland as early as August 2023, one month before introduction.

Implementation of the label to the rest of the UK was proposed in January 2024 which would be required for all meat products from October 2024. Consultation on the expansion followed in February 2024. On 30 September 2024, the government decided not to proceed with the UK-wide "Not for EU" label requirement, the day before it would have been required.

Phase 1 required that meat and certain dairy products under the NIRMS are labelled from 1 October 2023. This is followed by phase 2 from 1 October 2024 for all dairy products. From 1 July 2025, composite products which contain both products of plant and animal origin, such as pizza, have to be labelled.

The requirement for "not for EU" labelling caused some customers to think the UK food standards had dropped since leaving the EU and was described as "bureaucratic madness" by the chief executive of Marks & Spencer, Stuart Machin.

== See also ==
- UKCA marking – Declaration of conformity with British standards
- CE marking – European Declaration of conformity mark
- Brexit and the Irish border – Effect on Ireland's UK/EU border
- UK Internal Market – UK law relating to internal trade
- Common Veterinary Area – Agreement between Switzerland and the EU (which means that the same issue does not arise at the Swiss/EU border)
