= CEBEC =

Electronics quality assurance label

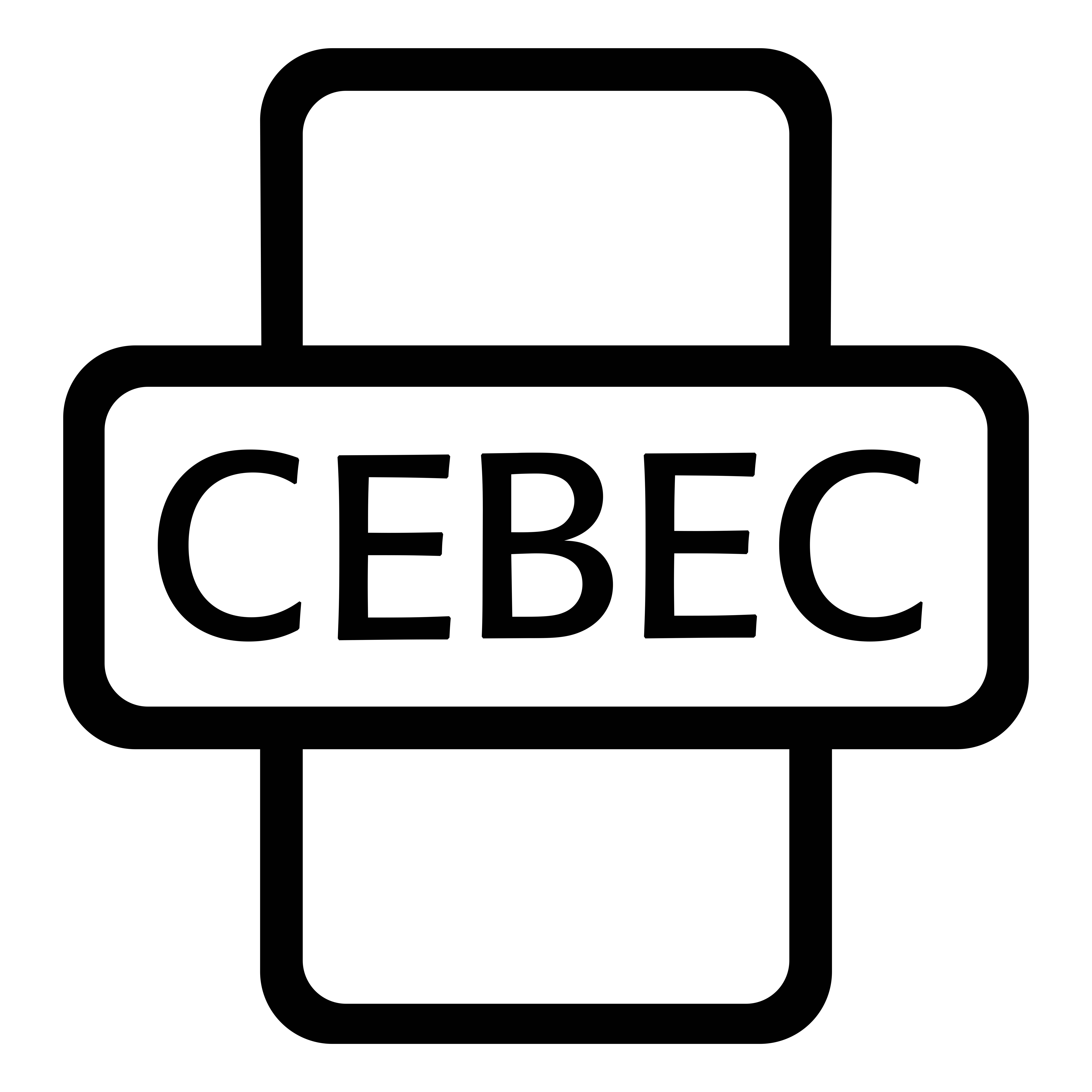
CEBEC label

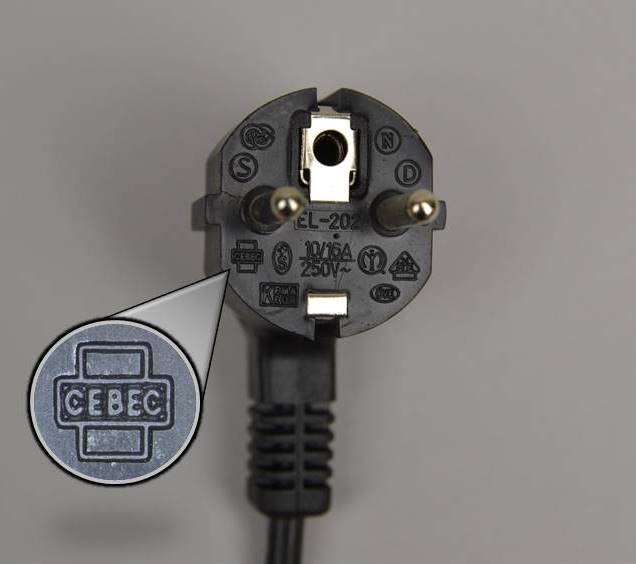
The CEBEC label on plug (bottom left side)

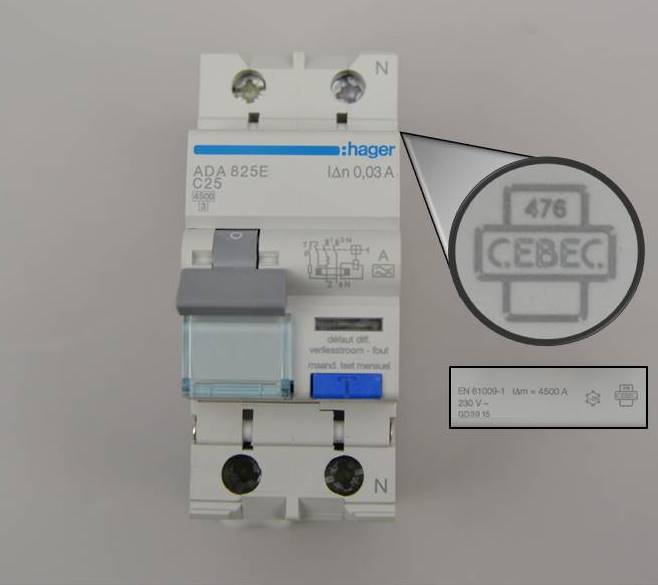
The CEBEC label on circuit breaker

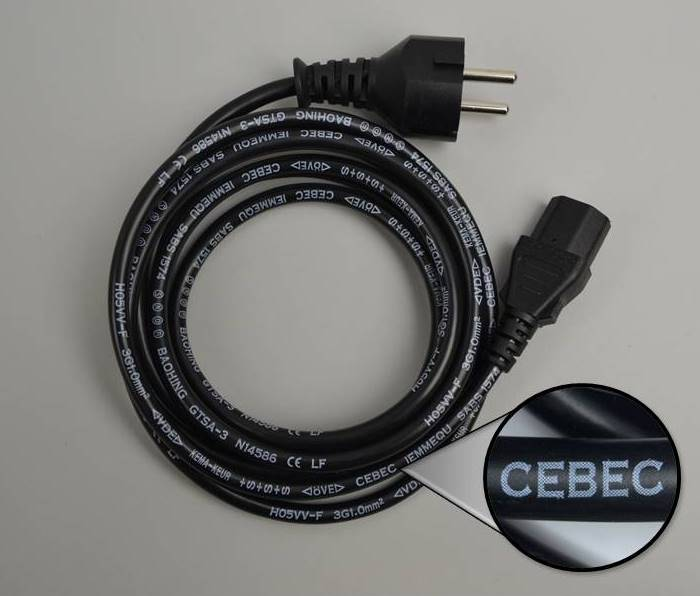
The CEBEC label on cord set

CEBEC (French: Comité Electrotechnique Belge; Flemish: Belgisch Elektrotechnisch Comité) is a private Belgian rating label for the quality assurance of electrical appliances. Use of this label indicates that a piece of equipment conforms to European safety standards. The label is issued by SGS-CEBEC, now part of the SGS group. CEBEC has its own electrical testing laboratory located in Brussels. It is an approved laboratory for the purpose of certifications granted by SGS.

The laboratory was set up in 2002. In 2004 it was audited by an international team and at the end of 2004 the SGS CEBEC laboratory was approved as a CBTL (CB Testing Laboratory) under the international IECEE-CB scheme. In 2005, it was approved by EEPCA as a laboratory operating in compliance with the CCA, HAR and ENEC agreements.

== Certification ==
The following Marks and Certifications can be obtained on the basis of testing performed in the SGS CEBEC laboratory:

- CEBEC

Mark of compliance with Belgian safety standards. It is widely recognized in Europe and worldwide and generally equivalent to the European EN and International IEC Standards

- IECEE/CB

International scheme for mutual acceptance of CB test reports and certification, based on IEC standards

- ENEC

European mark for electrical equipment safety

- ENEC+

European mark for performance of electrical equipment

- CCA

European scheme for mutual acceptance of CCA test reports and certification, based on European standards

- LOVAG

Agreement for electrical low-voltage equipment used in an industrial environment

- HAR

European mark for electrical cables

== Services ==
Product categories

Products for which certification services are available include:

- CABL: electrical cable
- CONT: automatic control equipment
- HOUS: electrical household appliances
- INST: installation equipment
- ITAV: information technology Audio Video
- MEAS: measuring equipment
- MED: electro-medical equipment
- OFF: information-processing equipment
- POW: power equipment
- PROT: protection equipment
- SAFE: transformers
- TRON: electronics household equipment

Special Tests

Among others, SGS CEBEC laboratory offers a range of testing services:

- Flammability Testing

Tests performed on insulating or plastic materials intended to measure the vulnerability of the material and its potential ignition source through Glow-Wire, Needle Flame or HB, V2, V1, V0 and 5V test

- IP Testing

Tests that classify and rate the degree of protection that mechanical and electrical enclosures provide against solids and liquids as defined in IEC 60529

- IK Testing

Tests that define the degree of protection provided by enclosures for electrical equipment against external mechanical impacts in accordance with IEC 62262:2002 and IEC 60068-2-75:1997

- Energy Performance Testing

Tests that measure the energy efficiency of consumer electrics such as refrigerators and heaters and compare the Energy Performance ratings

- Performance Testing

Tests that compare the performance of electrical products in accordance with European Regulations

- Surveillance Testing

Tests performed on products which are selected on the market or in the factories

== Medical devices ==
SGS CEBEC provides professional one-stop testing and certification services for electrical and electronic medical devices including:

- Testing
- Certification
- Regulatory Compliance

With extensive experience in the EE medical devices sector, SGS CEBEC laboratory offers testing against all relevant standards, and certification against:

- IEC 60601-1 - Safety
- IEC 60601-2-XX - Performance
- IEC 60601-1-2 - EMC
- IEC 60601-1-6 & IEC 62366 - Usability
- IEC 62304 - Software
- IEC 62471, 60825-1 - LED & Laser
- ISO 10993 series - Biocompatibility
- RoHS & REACH directives
- Mechanical testing against medical device standards
- Reliability testing

== Health software ==
Intended for software only products for health use, hosted or running on generic devices without specific sensors, the IEC 82304-1 Health Software Product certification and the SGS HSP mark allows you to generate evidence towards presumption of regulatory conformity, based on risk assessment

HSP Services:

- IEC 82304-1 application training
- Consumer/health device product certification
- Medical device product certification
- Pre-evaluation of product readiness and weaknesses

== See also ==
- Conformance mark
- CE Marking
- IEC 60601
