= NZS =

NZS may refer to:

- Football Association of Slovenia
- Independent Students' Association (Poland)
- New Zealand Standard and "joint Australian/New Zealand Standard" (AS/NZS) by Standards Australia and Standards New Zealand
- New Zealand Steel
- New Zealand Football, formerly New Zealand Soccer
