= Factory mark =

Symbol or device applied to a product to identify its manufacturer

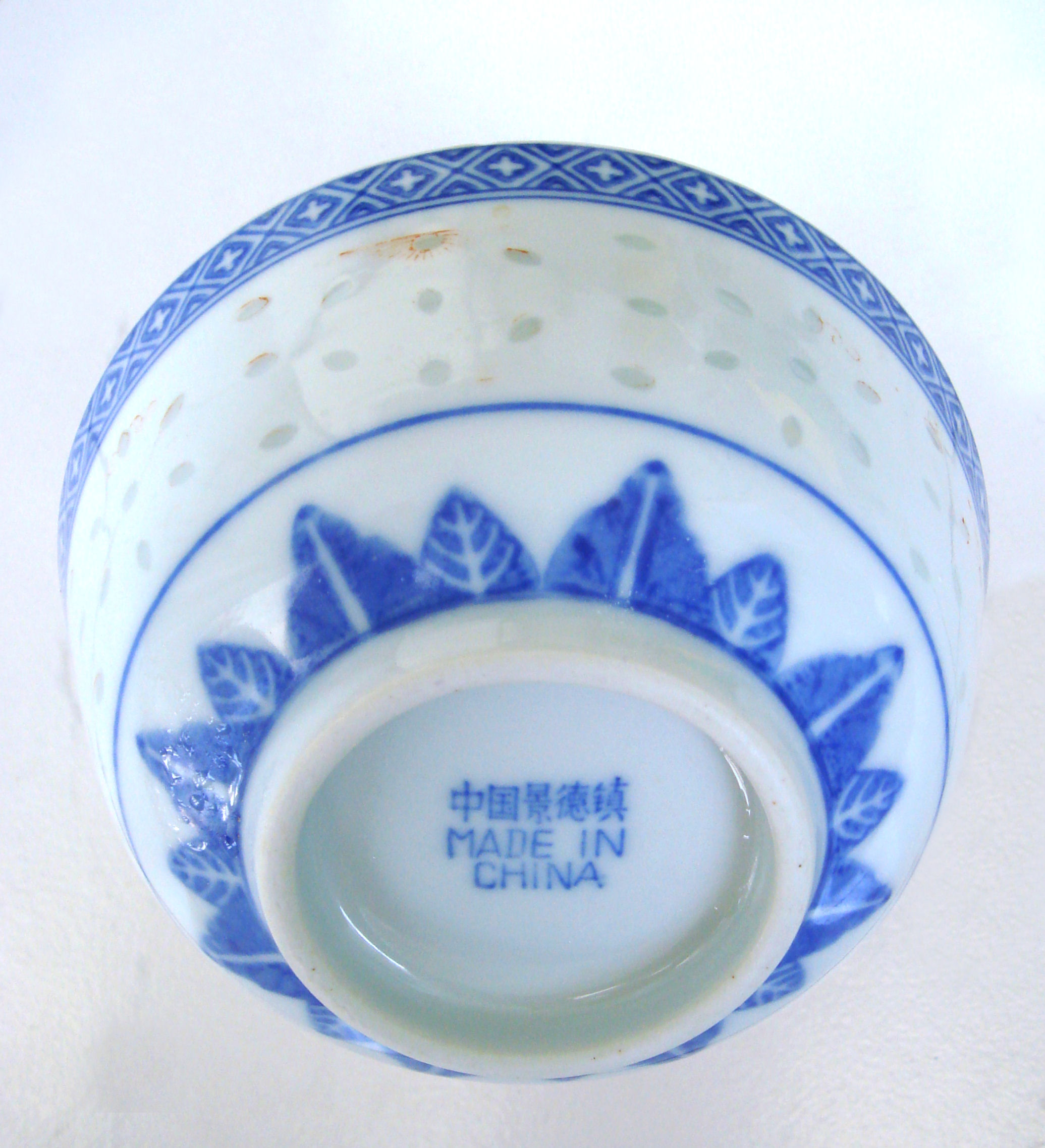
20th-century Jingdezhen ware, with factory mark: 中国景德镇 ("China Jingdezhen") and MADE IN CHINA in English

A factory mark is a marking affixed by manufacturers on their productions in order to authenticate them. Numerous factory marks are known throughout the ages, and are essential in determining the provenance or dating of productions.

== History ==
The manufacturer's marks are very old: the ones found on Korakou culture pottery are four thousand years old, and the ones on ancient Greek and Roman vases date back to 5th-4th centuries BC. While the production marks are technically distinct from the ownership marks, at these times, when a craftsman typically was the same person as the merchant, and many people were illiterate, a single mark frequently served both purposes.

Medieval guilds set up the system of compulsory ("regulatory") marks for the craftsman, intended to trace the defective items and punish the offenders, with most typical examples provided by the bakery trade. In English weapons manufacturing (including cutlery) the regulations concerning the manufacturer marks were firmly established in the 14th century: no weapon shall be sold without a personal mark of the craftsman, misuse of the mark was subject to court actions.

The distinction between the factory marks and trademarks in England became clear by the 17th century in the cloth trade: the manufacturer marks (initials of the maker weaved into the cloth) were required from the producers by regulations and represented a liability, while the trademark (mark of the clothier) represented the goodwill, an asset, not of the actual craftsman, but of the capitalist who furnished the capital for the production. The rise of factory marks (at the expense of the marks of actual makers) was also occurring elsewhere, De Munck links this to changes in the labor relations and methods of production (molds for earthenware, for example, reduced potters to low-skilled laborers).

=== Terminology ===
The terms "trademark", "brand", "certification mark" are very recent. The guild regulations were using "guild sign", "master sign", "quality mark", "sign", "mark", "signature". Modern researchers, when discussing historical marks, typically use "hallmark", and "trade mark" for guild marks, "monogram" for individual or company marks.

=== Forgery ===
The factory marks have been imitated "profusely through the ages" in order to inflate the value of the goods, particularly the porcelain pieces, so accepting the mark at its face value requires a degree of care.

== Porcelain ==
Factory marks are essential in the area of porcelain production especially, where they are sometimes also called "backstamps", and where their absence would make authentication much more difficult. It is frequently claimed that the first factory mark on the European porcelain, in the shape of crossed swords, appeared on the Meissen pieces in 1720. Edwards points out to earlier examples of Saint-Cloud and Medici porcelain, but there is little doubt that the Meissen mark was the first ever on a commercial porcelain product.

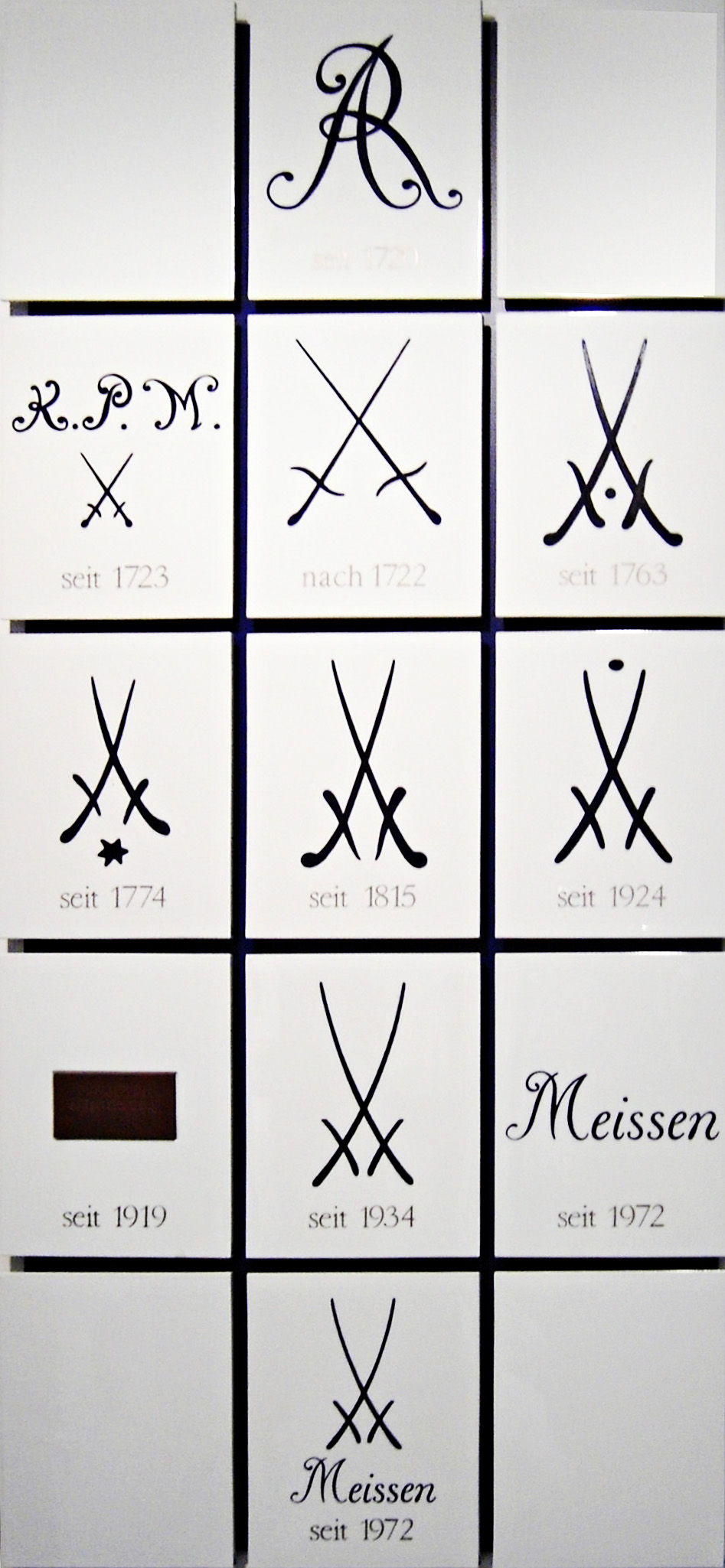
Meissen porcelain factory marks.

== See also ==
- Builder's signature
- House mark
- Mason's mark
- Merchant's mark
- Printer's mark
- Tang mark

== Sources ==
- Schechter, Frank Isaac (1925). The Historical Foundations of the Law Relating to Trade-marks. New York: Columbia University Press. ISBN 978-1-58477-035-0. OCLC 41951335.
- De Munck, Bert (December 2012). "The agency of branding and the location of value. Hallmarks and monograms in early modern tableware industries". Business History. 54 (7): 1055–1076. doi:10.1080/00076791.2012.683422. eISSN 1743-7938. ISSN 0007-6791. S2CID 218587496.
- Edwards, Howell G. M. (2022). Porcelain Analysis and Its Role in the Forensic Attribution of Ceramic Specimens (PDF). Cultural Heritage Science. Springer International Publishing. doi:10.1007/978-3-030-80952-2. eISSN 2366-6234. ISBN 978-3-030-80951-5. ISSN 2366-6226. S2CID 243850581.
- Di Palma, Salvatore (2015). The History of Marks from Antiquity to the Middle Ages. Société des écrivains. ISBN 978-2-342-04143-9. OCLC 1063600656.
