= ETL SEMKO =

Subsidiary

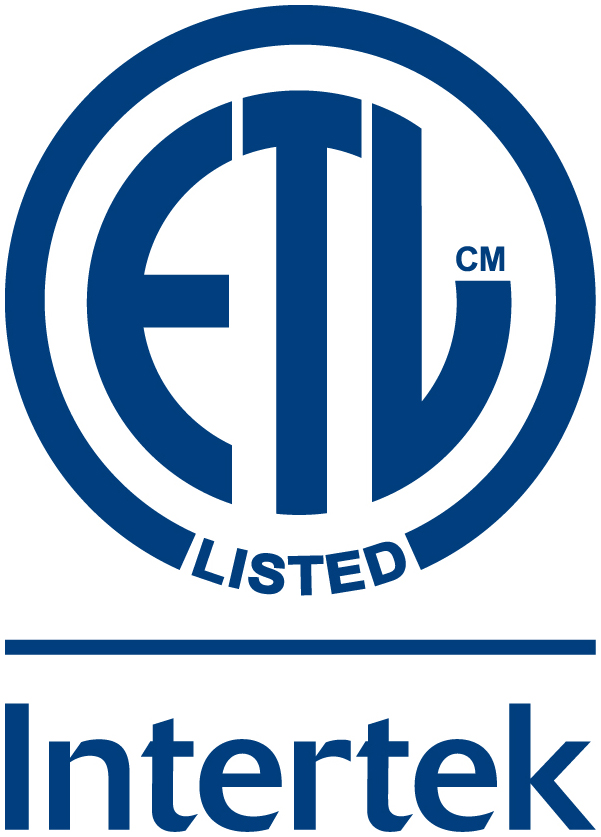

ETL SEMKO (formerly Electrical Testing Laboratory) is a division of Intertek Group plc (LSE: ITRK) which is based in London. It specializes in electrical product safety testing, EMC testing, and benchmark performance testing. ETL SEMKO operates more than 30 offices and laboratories on six continents. SEMKO (Svenska Elektriska Materielkontrollanstalten "The Swedish Electric Equipment Control Office") was, until 1990, the body responsible for testing and certifying electric appliances in Sweden. The "S" mark was mandatory for products sold in Sweden until the common European CE mark was adopted prior to Sweden's accession to the European Union.

== See also ==
- Product certification
- Canadian Standards Association
- CE mark
- Certification mark
- Underwriters Laboratories
