= VCCI =

VCCI may also refer to:

- Voluntary Control Council for Interference by Information Technology Equipment
- Vietnam Chamber of Commerce and Industry
