= Certification mark =

Graphic mark indicating compliance with a standard

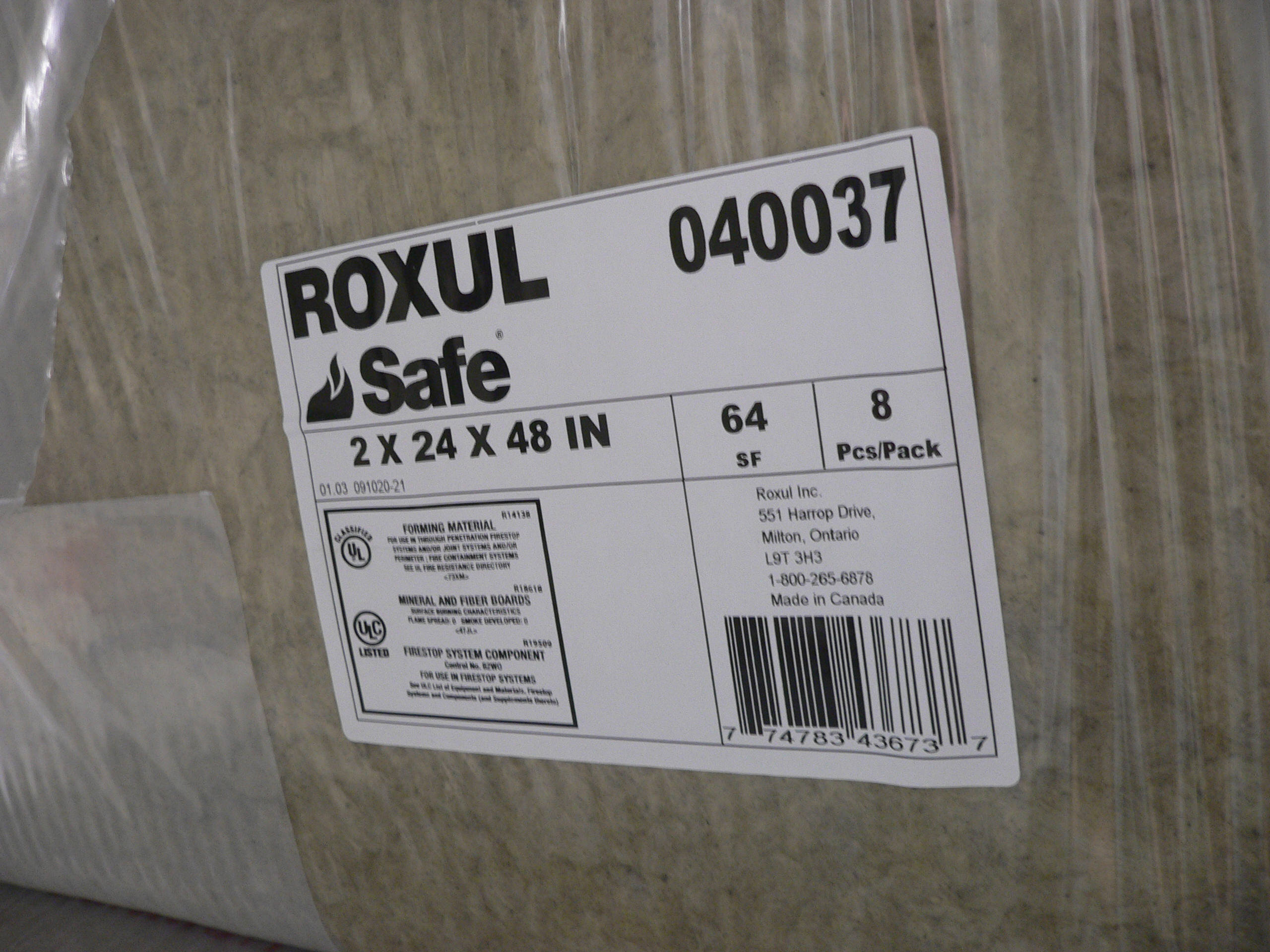
Canadian certification label on a bag of rockwool

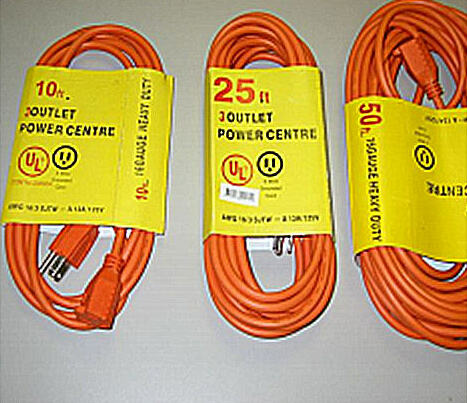
Counterfeit electrical cords with false UL certification marks

A certification mark on a commercial product or service is a registered mark that enables its owner ("certification body") to certify that the goods or services of a particular provider (who is not the owner of the certification mark) have particular properties, e.g., regional or other origin, material, quality, accuracy, mode of manufacture, being produced by union labor, etc. The standards to which the product is held are stipulated by the owner of the certification mark.

There are essentially three general types of certification marks:

1. certifying that goods or services had originated in a particular geographic region (e.g., Roquefort cheese);
2. certifying that goods or services meet particular standards for quality, materials, methods of manufacturing, for example, tests by the Underwriter Laboratories;
3. certifying that the manufacturer has met certain standards or belong to a certain organization or union (e.g., "union made" in clothing).

The term "certification mark" is very recent, so while discussing historical certification marks, terms "guild sign", "quality mark", "hallmark", and "trade mark" are used by researchers.

A certification mark indicates a property standard or regulation and a claim that the manufacturer has verified compliance with those standards or regulations. The specific specification, test methods, and frequency of testing are published by the standards organization. Certification listing does not necessarily guarantee fitness-for-use. Validation testing, proper usage, and field testing are often needed.

== Certification marks distinguished from other marks ==
Certification marks can be owned by independent companies absolutely unrelated in ownership to the companies, offering goods or rendering services under the particular certification mark.

=== Certification marks and trademarks ===
The USPTO states that a certification mark is "a type of trademark". However, it "is a special creature, created for a purpose uniquely different from that of a trademark or service mark", since:

- its owner cannot use it (it is used only by providers of certified goods or services);
- the mark does not define the source of the product. Instead, it identifies properties of the good or service (regional or other origin), material, quality, accuracy, etc.

However, what is meant by a collective trade marks or certification mark differs from country to country. However, a common feature of these types of marks is that they may be used by more than one person, as long as the users comply with the regulations of use or standards established by the holder. Those regulations or standards may require that the mark be used only in connection with goods that have a particular geographical origin or specific characteristics. In some jurisdictions, the main difference between collective marks and certification marks is that the former may only be used by members of an association, while certification marks may be used by anyone who complies with the standards defined by the holder of the mark. The holder, which may be a private or a public entity, acts as a certifier verifying that the mark is used according to established standards. Generally, the holder of a certification mark does not itself have the right to use the mark.

For various reasons, usually relating to technical issues, certification marks are difficult to register, especially in relation to services. One practical workaround for trademark owners is to register the mark as an ordinary trademark in relation to quality control and similar services.

=== Certification marks and approvals ===
Certification is often mistakenly referred to as an approval, which is not true. Organizations such as Underwriters Laboratories, TÜV Rheinland, NTA Inc, and CSA International will test the products according to standard procedures and "list" them as compliant to that standard. They do not approve anything except the use of the mark to show that a product has been certified for compliance with such specific standard. Thus, for instance, a product certification mark for a fire door or for a spray fireproofing product does not signify its universal acceptance for use within a building. Approvals are up to the Authority Having Jurisdiction (AHJ), such as a municipal building inspector or fire prevention officer.

== Regulations ==
Trademark laws in countries, such as the United States, Australia, and others that provide for the filing of applications to register certificate marks also usually require the submission of regulations, which define a number of issues, including:

- People authorized to use the certification mark
- Characteristics that the certification mark certifies
- How the certification or standards tests these characteristics and supervises use of the mark
- What the dispute resolution procedures are

The main purpose of the regulations is to protect consumers against misleading practices.

== Examples ==
Primary jurisdiction	Body/mark	Image
International	The Asthma & Allergy Friendly Certification Mark allows consumers to identify products relevant for those suffering from asthma and allergies. Allergy Standards operates the Certification Program internationally.; The Bureau Veritas certification mark, used to indicate, for example, sea-worthiness of ships.; International Fairtrade Certification Mark; The SGS Product Safety Mark is used to prove that the product fulfills all relevant product safety requirements applicable in the destination market.; The Sugarwise Certification Mark for sugar related claims identifies products that are low in free sugars; The Quiet Mark for products assessed as having lower noise output or effective noise-reduction performance.	
Australia New Zealand	The Joint Accreditation System of Australia and New Zealand (JAC ANZ), which has recognised 67 conformity assessment bodies including: The AS/NZS accreditation of Standards Australia and Standards New Zealand.; The RCM (Regulatory Compliance Mark) is the compliance mark for all applicable Australian Communications and Media Authority (ACMA) regulatory arrangements, including all technical and record-keeping requirements.; The R-NZ label is used when the product is a radio transmitter in a class where the level of conformity is A1, A2 or A3, you need to use the R-NZ compliance mark, not the RCM. The R-NZ is a New Zealand-only radio label for radio products not harmonised standard with Australia.; The Woolmark certification mark, used to identify goods that contain wool.	Regulatory Compliance Mark
Belgium	CEBEC is a private certification mark used in Belgium	CEBEC
Brazil	In Brazil, electrical and electronic products that meet Brazilian requirements and that are certified by INMETRO must carry the mandatory INMETRO mark.	INMETRO Mark
Canada	The CSA mark used by the Canadian Standards Association; The Asthma & Allergy Friendly Certification Mark is operated in Canada by Allergy Standards in partnership with Asthma Canada.	CSA mark Asthma & Allergy Friendly
China	The China Compulsory Certificate mark used by China.	China Compulsory Certificate
CIS	State Quality Mark of the USSR; GOST; Eurasian Conformity mark	EAC mark GOST mark
Eurasian Customs Union	The Eurasian Conformity mark used by the Eurasian Customs Union	EAC mark
European Union	The CE mark is a mandatory conformity mark for products placed on the market in the European Economic Area (EEA). With the CE marking on a product the manufacturer ensures that the product conforms with the essential requirements of the applicable EC directives.	CE mark
France	In the domestic market, the 'NF' certification mark referring to 'Norme française' (French standard). The NF mark is a collective certification mark attesting to the conformity of a product or service to safety and quality characteristics. It is issued by Afnor Certification, as well as by certain organizations belonging to the NF network.; The "Champagne" certification mark, used to indicate goods that have an appellation of origin of the Champagne region in France.	NF logo (Norme française)
Germany	TÜV marks, used by private safety organizations called Technischer Überwachungsverein in Germany; Blue Angel, used by products to certify it passed strict environmental standards by the organisation.	
(Cooperation Council for the Arab States of the Gulf) Gulf Cooperation Council	G-marks, used by private safety organizations in GCC	G-mark
India	Certification marks in India including: ISI mark indicating conforming to Indian Standards (as specified)	
Japan	Japanese Industrial Standards symbol (〄, U+3004)	Japanese Industrial Standards
Mexico	The NOM logo serves a similar purpose for products on the market in Mexico.	Norma Oficial Mexicana
Morocco	Morocco's safety standard mark for marketing of toys and electrical products	CMIM mark
Norway	Norges Elektriske Materiellkontroll (NEMKO), Norway NEMKO	
South Korea	Korean Industrial Standards (also known as KC Safety Certification or KC Mark Korea Certification) is a product certification that proves the compliance of products with Korean safety regulations.	KC Certification logo
Sweden	Electrical Testing Laboratory, Sweden ETL SEMKO	ETL SEMKO
Taiwan	Bureau of Standards, Metrology and Inspection marks such as the Registration of Product Certification	
Ukraine	DSTU, State Standard of Ukraine is regulated by State Committee for Technical Regulation and Consumer Policy	DSTU mark
United Kingdom	Kitemark is a British Standard under BSI Group.; The LPCB (Loss Prevention Certification Board) mark by BRE Global (part of the Building Research Establishment group) independently certificates fire and security products, which are then listed in the Red Book.; UKCA (UK Conformity Assessed) for the rest; UKNI for Northern Ireland	Kitemark UKCA mark
United States	The Asthma & Allergy Friendly Certification Mark is operated in the US by Allergy Standards in partnership with the Asthma and Allergy Foundation of America.; Energy Star for energy efficient consumer products originating in the US; The FCC Declaration of Conformity is a mandatory conformity mark for electronic equipment manufactured or sold in the United States. This marking certifies that the product meets standards of the Federal Communications Commission regarding electromagnetic interference.; The hechsher of the Orthodox Union indicating conformity Judaism's Halakha standards, a Kosher certification agency.; The "Idaho" and "Grown in Idaho" certification marks, used by Idaho Potato Commission to indicate potatoes grown in the State of Idaho in the United States of America.; The National Testing Agency (NTA Inc) mark allows consumers to identify certified products in the United States building industry.; QAI Laboratories (QAI) certification mark, commonly used on building products, plumbing, and electrical products.; Underwriters Laboratories holds a service mark on the phrase "UL Listed", and allows manufacturers of electrical and other safety equipment to use the UL mark only if they are under follow-up agreement by UL. This lets consumers identify products that meet quality criteria set by a company other than the manufacturer.	FCC NTA Inc hechsher Energy Star

== International treaties and certification marks ==
Many jurisdictions have been required to amend their trade mark legislation to accommodate protection of certification marks under the TRIPs treaty.

Some jurisdictions recognise certification marks from other jurisdictions. This means good manufactured in one country may need not go through certification in another. One example is the European Union recognition of Australia and New Zealand marks based on an International treaty.

== Cases ==
Cases involving certification marks include:

- Re Legal Aid Board's Trade Mark Application (unreported 3 October 2000, UK Court of Appeals)
- the Sea Island Cotton case [1989]RPC 87

== See also ==
- Certification listing
- Certification marks in India
- Collective trade marks
- Fire protection
- Hallmark
- Listing and approval use and compliance
- Passive fire protection
- Product certification
- State quality mark of the USSR
- Trademark

== Sources ==
- John Marshall Law School (2010). The Intersection of Intellectual Property Law and the Green Movement: RIPL's Green Issue 2010. Quid Pro, LLC. ISBN 978-1-61027-973-4.
- Trademark Manual of Examining Procedure (TMEP). U.S. Department of Commerce, Patent and Trademark Office. 1997.
- Belson, J. (2002). Certification Marks. Special Report Series. Sweet & Maxwell. ISBN 978-0-421-75820-9.
- De Munck, Bert (December 2012). "The agency of branding and the location of value. Hallmarks and monograms in early modern tableware industries". Business History. 54 (7): 1055–1076. doi:10.1080/00076791.2012.683422. eISSN 1743-7938. ISSN 0007-6791. S2CID 218587496.
