= Kitemark =

UK product and service quality trade mark

- BSI Kitemark certification symbol
- Certifying agency: BSI Group
- Effective region: United Kingdom
- Effective since: 1903
- Product category: Various
- Legal status: Advisory
- Website: Kitemark home page

The Kitemark is a UK product and service quality trade mark which is owned and operated by the British Standards Institution (BSI Group).

According to BSI, Kitemark certification confirms that a product or service's claim has been independently and repeatedly tested by experts, meaning that purchasers can have trust and confidence in products and services that are BSI Kitemark certified.

The Kitemark is most frequently used to identify products where safety is paramount, such as crash helmets, smoke alarms and flood defences. In recent years, the Kitemark has also been applied to a range of services. Accredited services include providers of electrical installations, inclusive service provision, car servicing, panel beating/accident repair, and window installations. The term kite mark is sometimes used colloquially as a level of quality that can be used as a standard against which something of a similar type can be measured or judged, i.e. as a benchmark.

Common household or consumer products that are often Kitemark certified include EV chargers; domestic furniture (such as sofas and mattresses); IoT/ smart connected products such as doorbells and security cameras. A full list can be seen on BSI's Kitemark product testing webpage.

== History ==
The Kitemark was originally conceived by John Wolfe Barry in 1903, as a symbol to identify products manufactured to meet British Standards' specifications. "Kitemark" came from the kite shape of the graphic device which was drawn up – an uppercase B (for British) on its back, over an S (for standard), enclosed by a V (for verification).

The Kitemark was subsequently registered as a trademark on 12 June 1903 and as such is among the oldest product quality marks in the world still in regular use. The copyright on the Kitemark expired on 31 December 1968, 50 years after Barry's death. (Note: At the time when the kitemark entered the public domain, the copyright term under the Copyright Act 1956 was 50 years.)

The Kitemark was initially used as a trade mark on tramway rails in 1903 and was instrumental in reducing the number of specifications for rails from 75 to 5. The first full Kitemark scheme – equivalent to today's Kitemark – came into being in 1926, when the General Electric Company was awarded a Kitemark for light fittings.

For the next few decades, the use of Kitemark was largely limited to technical and engineering applications up until the 1950s when the boom in consumer products led to increased concern about product safety. By the 1960s the Kitemark was being used to identify safe products in areas such as nightwear, domestic furniture, pressure cookers and motorcycle helmets.

With the introduction of quality management systems standards in the 1970s Kitemark schemes were developed in areas such as double glazing and fire safety. As of March 2021, there are more than 450 individual Kitemark schemes covering products as diverse as printed circuit boards and cattle tags, and services as disparate as financial products and flood protection. There are also currently more than 2,500 Kitemark licences, held by, amongst others, Anglian Home Improvements, Chubb Security & Fire Protection, Everest, Hygena, and Tarmac and Valor.

== Availability ==
The Kitemark is only available from BSI Group. To obtain Kitemark certification, products and services are assessed by BSI Product Services to ensure that they meet the requirements of the relevant British, European, trade association or international specification or standard. In addition, delivery of the product or service is audited against an accredited quality management system. Once a Kitemark licence is issued, licensees are regularly audited and are subject to surveillance visits to ensure continuing compliance.

== Market acceptance ==
The Kitemark is not a legal requirement, but (according to BSI) is often used as a point of differentiation in competitive markets and is widely trusted. A 2006 survey demonstrated that the Kitemark is recognized by 82 per cent of the UK population, 88 per cent of whom trust the Kitemark, 93 per cent of whom believe that Kitemark products are safer, and 91 per cent of whom believe the product is of a better quality than similar products without the Kitemark. A 2008 YouGov poll showed that almost half (49 per cent) of UK consumers look for a Kitemark when making a purchase. In 2022, a survey of over 2000 UK consumers concluded that 1 in 4 UK citizens look for a certification symbol or logo, such as the BSI Kitemark, when making the decision to purchase a quality electrical product.

In 2008 and 2009 the Kitemark was independently voted a Superbrand in the Top 500 Business Superbrands in the UK.

The word "Kitemark" is a registered trade mark of the British Standards Institution.

== Examples of Kitemark schemes ==
- Anti Microbial Resistance Kitemark
- Balustrading
- Building Information Modelling (BIM)
- Cable Testing Verification
- Carbon monoxide detectors
- Carbon Neutral Product Kitemark
- Customer Service Kitemark
- Domestic Furniture Kitemark
- EV Chargers
- Fire extinguishers
- Flood barriers
- Fuses
- Glass
- Horse riding helmets
- Inclusive Service Kitemark ISO 22458
- Innovation Management Kitemark ISO 56002
- Ladders
- Locks and keys
- Motorcycle helmets
- Plugs and sockets
- Prophylactics
- Sanitiser Kitemark
- Vehicle Damage Repair Kitemark BS 10125
- Windows and doors

== See also ==
- British Standards – Standards produced by BSI Group
- Product certification – Performance and quality assurance
- Certification mark – Graphic mark indicating compliance with a standard
  - CE marking – European Declaration of conformity mark
  - UKCA marking – Declaration of conformity with British standards
