= Eurasian Conformity mark =

Mark to certify conformity

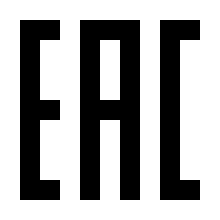
The Eurasian Conformity mark.

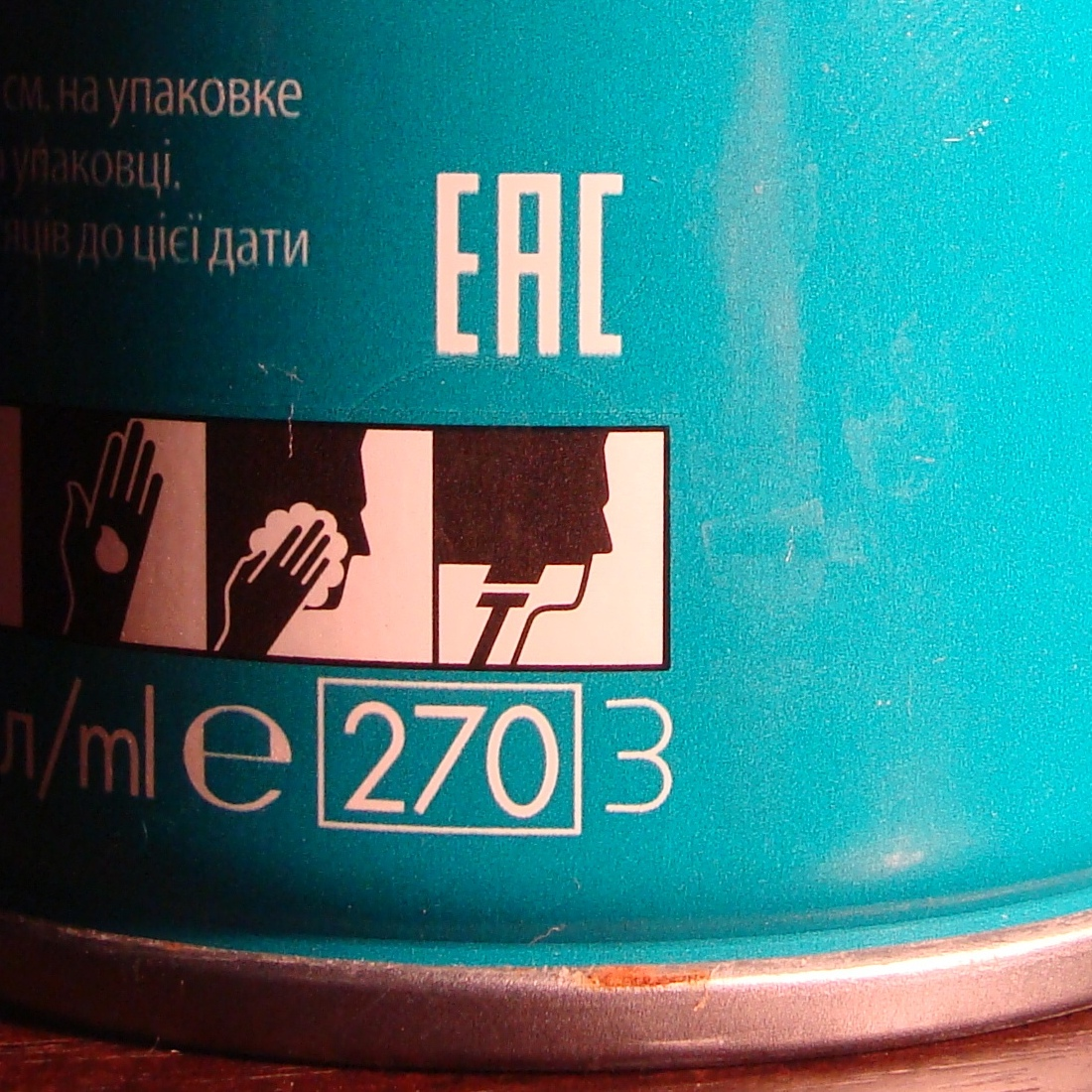
The EAC marking on a product.

The Eurasian Conformity mark (EAC, Russian: Евразийское соответствие (ЕАС)) is a certification mark to indicate products that conform to all technical regulations of the Eurasian Customs Union. It means that the EAC-marked products meet all requirements of the corresponding technical regulations and have passed all conformity assessment procedures.

The product conformity mark according to GOST 50460-92, now replaced by EAC

Before this marking came into use, the prevalent product marking was GOST R 50460-92: Mark of conformity for mandatory certification.

== History ==
Originally, the conformity assessment of the products, which were brought on the market of the USSR or Russia for the first time, was defined by GOST and TR standards.

From July 1, 2010, the Customs Code of the Customs Union between Russia, Belarus and Kazakhstan entered into force. The new Customs Code should replace the existing national certification rules such as Russian GOST-R, TR or Kazakh GOST-K standards by the uniform technical regulations and technical guidelines of the Customs Union.

Products, which thus meet the requirements of the technical regulations of the Customs Union or the Eurasian Economic Union (EAEU) (consisting of Russia, Belarus, Armenia, Kazakhstan, Kyrgyzstan), are marked with the EAC mark. The uniform EAC marking of the customs union was defined by the board decision of the EAEU Commission No. 711 of July 15, 2011.

The term TR marking in conjunction with the conformity assurance with the technical regulations of the CU or EAEU is therefore incorrect. Since February 2010, the new list of products subject to certification and declaration has been valid for the GOST-regulated area. In accordance with Federal Law No. 385 of December 30, 2009 On amendments to the Federal Law on Technical Regulation, the original deadline for 2010 was lifted on the personal request of the former President of Russia, Dmitry Medvedev, and the following items were ordered:

- To simplify the procedure for the introduction or modification of the TR in Russia (Ministry of Industry and Trade)
- To permit the application of international or foreign standards and guidelines (official translation, expertise by the standard authority, registration in the state standard information depot)
- To develop additional technical regulations without time limit

== Development and function of EAC marking ==
The EAC marking has been created to ensure the product safety for the final consumer. The board decision of the Customs Union of June 18, 2010, the Customs Union Convention of November 18, 2010, and the board decision of the Customs Union of April 7, 2011 provide the legal framework for numerous products of safety and health requirements as minimum requirements, which must not be undercut. A product may only be put into circulation for the first time in the field of EAEU and must be put into operation for the first time if it complies with the essential requirements of all applicable technical regulations. Some of the methods provided for this purpose are:

- EAC declaration
- EAC certification
- State registration

With the EAC marking, the manufacturer indicates the conformity of the product with the basic requirements according to the applicable technical regulations. The manufacturer of the product is responsible for this marking (a representative authorized in the EAEU is required for manufacturers outside the EAEU). To the extent that the manufacturer has not complied with his duty outside the EAEU, this obligation is transferred to the authorized representative in the EAEU, and ultimately on the importer into the EAEU.

== Important features of EAC marking ==
- Products which are subject to one or more technical regulations because of their nature must be marked with the EAC marking before being placed on the market or put into service for the first time. All applicable technical regulations must be taken into account.
- Manufacturers of a product are responsible for which technical regulations they must apply during production.
- The product may only be placed on the market and put into service if it complies with the provisions of all technical regulations applicable at the present time, and it is provided that the conformity assessment has been carried out in accordance with all applicable technical regulations.
- The manufacturer shall attach the EAC marking to the product.
- If required, an authorized body must be involved in the conformity assessment.
- In addition to the EAC marking, no other mark or seal of approval is permitted, which could call into question the statement of the "EAC".
- The EAC marking confirms full compliance with the "Basic Safety Requirements", which are specified in the Technical Regulations.

== Attachment of EAC marking ==
The EAC marking shall be put onto the product or to the attached label in a visible, legible, distinctive and permanent manner by the manufacturer or his authorized representative in the EAEU. The size must be at least 5 mm; the proportions must be respected if the EAC marking is reduced or enlarged. If the nature of the product does not allow it, it shall be put onto the package (if any) and the accompanying documents. The EAC marking may only be carried out when all the requirements of the technical regulations applicable to the corresponding product have been met this includes EAC Certified lighting products for use in hazardous areas.

== Application area ==
The EAC marking is the prerequisite for the initial placing on the market in all member-states of the Eurasian Economic Union. The EAEU includes Russia, Belarus, Armenia, Kazakhstan and Kyrgyzstan.

== Technical regulations ==
For the following product groups there are technical regulations of the CU or EAEU as basis for the EAC marking.

=== Technical regulations of Customs Union and Eurasian Economic Union ===
Status	In force on	Number	Name of the Technical Regulation
Valid	15.02.2012	TR CU 006/2011	On safety of pyrotechnic products
Valid	01.06.2012	TR CU 019/2011	On safety of personal protective equipment
Valid	01.07.2012	TR CU 005/2011	On safety of packaging
Valid	01.07.2012	TR CU 007/2011	On safety of the products for children and teenagers
Valid	01.07.2012	TR CU 008/2011	On safety of toys
Valid	01.07.2012	TR CU 009/2011	On safety of perfume and cosmetic products
Valid	01.07.2012	TR CU 017/2011	On safety of light industry products
Valid	31.12.2012	TR CU 013/2011	On requirements for motor and aviation gasoline, diesel and marine fuel, jet fuel and heating oil
Valid	15.02.2013	TR CU 004/2011	On safety of low-voltage equipment
Valid	15.02.2013	TR CU 010/2011	On safety of machinery and equipment
Valid	15.02.2013	TR CU 011/2011	On safety of elevators
Valid	15.02.2013	TR CU 012/2011	On safety of the equipment for work in explosive environment
Valid	15.02.2013	TR CU 016/2011	On safety of devices operating on the gaseous fuel
Valid	15.02.2013	TR CU 020/2011	Electromagnetic compatibility of hardware
Valid	01.07.2013	TR CU 015/2011	On safety of grain
Valid	01.07.2013	TR CU 021/2011	On safety of food products
Valid	01.07.2013	TR CU 022/2011	Food products in terms of their marking
Valid	01.07.2013	TR CU 023/2011	On fruit and vegetable juice products
Valid	01.07.2013	TR CU 024/2011	On fat and oil products
Valid	01.07.2013	TR CU 027/2012	On safety of certain types of specialized food products
Valid	01.07.2013	TR CU 029/2012	On safety of food additives, flavorings and technological processing aids
Valid	01.02.2014	TR CU 032/2013	On safety of equipment operating under excessive pressure
Valid	01.02.2014	TR CU 026/2012	On safety of small size vessels
Valid	01.03.2014	TR CU 030/2012	On safety of lubricants, oils and special fluids
Valid	01.05.2014	TR CU 033/2013	On safety of milk and dairy products
Valid	01.05.2014	TR CU 034/2013	On safety of meat and meat products
Valid	01.07.2014	TR CU 025/2012	On safety of furniture products
Valid	01.07.2014	TR CU 028/2012	On safety of explosives and products based on them
Valid	02.08.2014	TR CU 001/2011	On safety of railway rolling stock
Valid	02.08.2014	TR CU 002/2011	On safety of high speed rail transport
Valid	02.08.2014	TR CU 003/2011	On safety of railway transport infrastructure
Valid	01.01.2015	TR CU 018/2011	On safety of wheeled vehicles
Valid	15.02.2015	TR CU 014/2011	On safety of motor roads
Valid	15.02.2015	TR CU 031/2012	On safety of agricultural or forestry tractors and trailers for them
Valid	15.05.2016	TR CU 035/2014	On tobacco products
Valid	01.09.2017	TR EAEU 040/2016	On safety of fish products
Valid	01.01.2018	TR EAEU 036/2016	On requirements covering liquefied petroleum gases for their use as fuel
Valid	01.03.2018	TR EAEU 037/2016	On restriction of the use of dangerous substances in electrical engineering and electronic devices
Valid	18.04.2018	TR EAEU 038/2016	On safety of attractions
Valid	17.11.2018	TR EAEU 042/2017	On safety of children's playground
Valid	01.01.2019	TR EAEU 044/2017	On safety of bottled drinking water, including natural mineral water
Valid	01.07.2019	TR EAEU 045/2017	On safety of mineral oil
Valid	01.01.2020	TR EAEU 043/2017	On requirements for fire safety devices and fire-fighting equipment
Valid	02.06.2021	TR EAEU 041/2017	On safety of chemicals
Adopted	unknown	TR EAEU 039/2016	On requirements for mineral fertiliser

== See also ==
- CE marking
- State quality mark of the USSR
- Certification mark
