= Gulf Conformity Mark =

GGC product conformity mark

G-Mark
- Effective region: Gulf Cooperation Council
- Effective since: 2009
- Product category: Various
- Legal status: Mandatory
- Website: www.gso.org.sa/en/conformity/gcc-conformity-mark

The Gulf Conformity Mark, also known as G-Mark, is a certification mark used to indicate products that conform to all technical regulations of the Gulf Cooperation Council. By including this mark, the manufacturer states that the product in question satisfies all relevant regulatory requirements and standards set by the GCC. The mark was introduced in 2009.
