= Collective trade mark =

A collective trademark, collective trade mark, or collective mark is a trademark owned by an organization (such as an association), used by its members to identify themselves with a level of quality or accuracy, geographical origin, or other characteristics set by the organization. Collective marks are also used to support the economic development of producer groups and local communities by providing a shared means of identifying and marketing their products.

Collective trademarks are exceptions to the underlying principle of trademarks in that most trademarks serve as "badges of origin"; they indicate the individual source of the goods or services. A collective trademark, however, can be used by a variety of traders, rather than just one individual concern, provided that the trader belongs to the association.

Collective trademarks differ from certification marks. The main difference is that collective trademarks may be used by particular members of the organization which owns them, while certification marks may be used by anybody who complies with the standards defined by the owner of the particular certification mark. All these factors are being completely at the level of intellectual property.

== Regulations on use ==
National trademark laws in some countries (such as Finland, Germany, Hungary and Switzerland) provide for the filing of the regulations as an additional requirement for registration of the collective trademark.

The regulations shall normally specify:

- the name and seat of the organization,
- information on the members authorized to use the collective trademark, including their names, addresses and seats,
- the conditions of membership,
- the conditions of use of the collective trademark,
- the prescriptions relating to the control of the use of the collective trademark,
- the order of proceedings against unauthorized use of the collective trademark.

The main purpose of the regulations is to protect consumers against misleading practices.

== Jurisdictional differences ==
=== China ===
In China, collective marks are also used, but with some differences from European law. Geographical indications can be registered as a collective mark, in which case the association must admit eligible applicants who qualify under their bylaws, and an otherwise qualifying applicant has the right to use the collective mark even if they do not join the association.

== International treaties ==
Many jurisdictions have been required to amend their trademark legislation in order to accommodate the requirement of protection of collective marks under TRIPs. Art. 7 bis of the Paris Convention also requires signatories "to accept for filing and to protect collective marks belonging to associations the existence of which is not contrary to the law of the country of origin, even if such organizations do not possess an industrial or commercial establishment."

== Examples ==
Examples of collective trademarks include:

- the "CA" device used by the Institute of Chartered Accountants;
- the mark "CPA", used to indicate members of the Society of Certified Public Accountants; and,
- the marks of various confederated lobby groups.
- "Mouchtia de Jebeniana", a traditional clothing from the city of Jebiniana in Tunisia
- Interflora, a flower delivery network

== Related cases ==
- The Parma Ham case [1991] RPC 251, in which the Consorzio del Prosciutto di Parma sued for passing off their unregistered collective mark;
- Association of Certified Public Accountants v. Trade Secretary [1998] 1 WLR 164.

== See also ==
- Certification mark
