= Nemko =

NEMKO
- Location: Norway
- Region served: Norway
- Website: nemko.com

Norges Elektriske Materiellkontroll (NEMKO) is a Norwegian private organization that supervises safety testing for electrical equipment manufacturing.

The Nemko Group offers testing, inspection and certification services concerning products, machinery, installations and systems worldwide.

== History ==
The original NEMKO was established in 1933 as an institution for mandatory safety testing and national approval of electrical equipment marketed and sold in Norway for connection to the public utility network.

Later, testing of radio interference requirements became another part of the approval regime.

In 1990, as Norway entered into the European Economic Area agreement, European Community Directives for product safety were adopted, and the traditional mandatory approval scheme was abandoned. As this stage, NEMKO was transformed into an independent, self-owned foundation, having a council of representatives from different interest groups (industry and trade organizations, consumer associations, utility companies etc.) as the highest level of supervision. At the same time, the foundation established and became the sole owner of Nemko AS, which constitutes the central operating company and is responsible for what is today denoted the Nemko Group.

Since 1992, the scope of services has expanded to testing, inspection, and certification services concerning products and systems in more than 150 countries.

In 2020, the company approved Apple's iPhone 12 charger with a USB-C connection.

== See also ==
- Certification mark
