= State Committee for Technical Regulation and Consumer Policy =

Ukrainian state standards organisation (2002–2011)

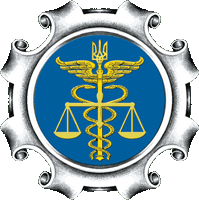

The State Committee for Technical Regulation and Consumer Policy (Ukrainian: Державний комітет України з питань технічного регулювання та споживчої політики, romanized: Derzhavnyi komitet Ukrainy z pytan tekhnichnoho rehuliuvannia ta spozhyvchoi polityky or Держспоживстандарт, Derzhspozhivstandard) was the Ukrainian state standards organization, established in 2002. It was the successor to the State Committee of Ukraine for Standardization, Metrology and Certification (Derzhstandart), which in turn was preceded by the Gosstandart standards agency of the Soviet Union, before Ukrainian independence in 1991.

It was liquidated in 2011 as part of administrative reform of President Viktor Yanukovych. The State Inspectorate of Ukraine for Consumer Protection was established on the basis of the State Committee for Technical Regulation and Consumer Policy.
