= FCC mark =

Voluntary declaration of conformity

- The FCC mark
- Standards organization: Federal Communications Commission
- Effective region: United States
- Product category: Electronic equipment.
- Legal status: Bears no legal weight

The FCC logo or the FCC mark is a voluntary mark employed on electronic products manufactured or sold in the United States which indicates that the electromagnetic radiation from the device is below the limits specified by the Federal Communications Commission and the manufacturer has followed the requirements of the Supplier's Declaration of Conformity authorization procedures. The FCC label is found even on products sold outside the US territory, because they are either products manufactured in the US and had been exported, or they are also sold in the US. This makes the FCC label recognizable worldwide even to people to whom the name of the agency is not familiar.

Formerly, devices classified under part 15 or part 18 of the FCC regulations were required to be labelled with the FCC mark, but in November 2017 the mark was made optional. Devices must still be accompanied by a Supplier's Declaration of Conformity (FCC Declaration of Conformity). The responsible party for the Supplier's Declaration of Conformity must be located within the United States.

== Overview ==
The 'FCC Declaration of Conformity' for personal computers that are assembled from components that have been separately authorized.

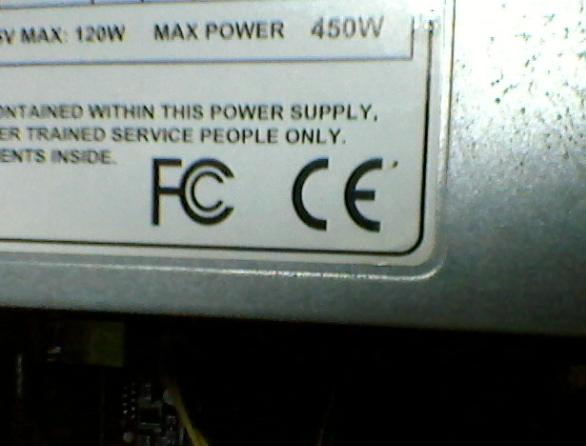
The FCC mark adjacent to CE mark on an SMPS made in China and sold in India. Note that the FCC mark bears no legal status where the CE mark does.

The Federal Communications Commission established the regulations on electromagnetic interference under Part 15 of the FCC rules in 1975. After several amendments over the years, these regulation were reconstituted as the Declaration of Conformity and Certification procedures in 1998.

The FCC mark is a stand-alone logo (as shown above) for devices falling under part 18 of Title 47 Code of Federal Regulations, for devices falling under part 15 rules, along with the logo, the label should display other data, viz., the trade name of the product, the model number, and information about whether the device was tested after assembling, or assembled from tested components. Electronic labeling is an alternative for devices equipped with a display.

Even though most of the nations exporting electronic equipment into the US market have their own standards for EMI as well as independent certification and conformity marks (e.g.: The CCC certification mark for China, the VCCI (Voluntary Council for Control of Interference) mark for Japan, the KC mark by the Korea Communications Commission for South Korea, the ANATEL mark for Brazil, and the BSMI mark for Taiwan), most of the products still sold in these markets hold the FCC label. Electronic products sold in parts of Asia and Africa hold the FCC label even though it holds no legal significance, and also without any means to verify whether they actually conform to the specified standards or not.

Canada's regulating body is called Innovation, Science and Economic Development Canada (ISED) - formally Industry Canada (IC). Products sold in Canada may have the FCC declaration and/or the CE declaration, however, neither declaration has any legal significance in Canada.

== See also ==
- CE mark
- Energy Star
