= Voluntary Control Council for Interference by Information Technology Equipment =

The Voluntary Control Council for Interference by Information Technology Equipment or VCCI is the Japanese body governing RF emissions (i.e. electromagnetic interference) standards.

It was formed in December 1985.

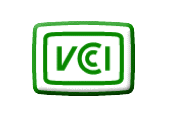
VCCI certification mark

The VCCI mark of conformance also appears on some electrical equipment sold outside Japan.
