= Standards New Zealand =

National standards body for New Zealand

The official logo of Standards New Zealand (Te Mana Tautikanga o Aotearoa), the national standards body for New Zealand.

Standards New Zealand (Māori: Te Mana Tautikanga o Aotearoa) is the national standards body for New Zealand. It is a business unit within the Ministry of Business, Innovation and Employment (MBIE) and works under the supervision of the NZ Standards Executive, an independent statutory role held by a ministry employee under the Standards and Accreditation Act 2015. Standards New Zealand had previously been a Crown entity and the operating arm of the Standards Council of New Zealand. Following the enaction of the Standard and Accreditation Act 2015 the council's role was taken on by the New Zealand Standards Approval Board and Standards New Zealand moved into MBIE on 1 March 2016.

Standards New Zealand is an International Organization for Standardization (ISO) member organisation that develops internationally aligned New Zealand standards (NZS) and participates in standards-related activities that deliver benefit to the nation. Standards New Zealand and Standards Australia work together to develop joint standards (AS/NZS). The majority of standards are developed in this partnership.

== See also ==
- Standards Australia
