= CE marking =

European Declaration of conformity mark

- Certifying agency: European Union (No Division)
- Effective region: European Economic Area, Turkey and United Kingdom
- Effective since: 1993
- Product category: Various
- Legal status: Mandatory
- Website: CE Marking homepage

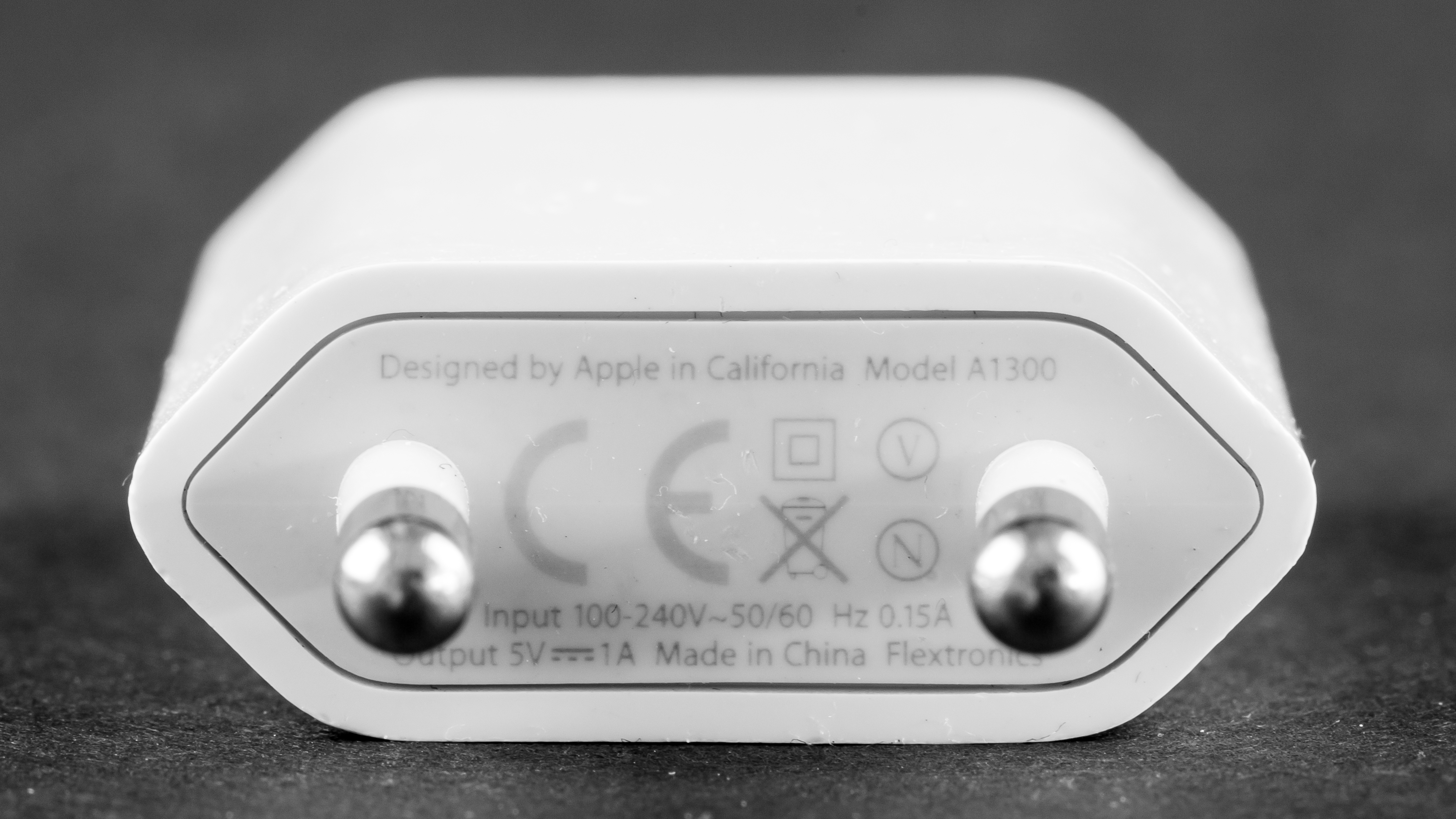
CE marking example on a mobile phone charger

CE marking is a mark that must be affixed to certain commercial products to indicate that the manufacturer or importer affirms the goods' conformity with European health, safety, and environmental protection standards. The mark is not a quality indicator or a certification mark. The CE marking is required for relevant goods sold in the European Economic Area (EEA); goods sold elsewhere may also carry the mark.

The mark indicates that the product may be traded freely in any part of the European Economic Area, regardless of its country of origin. It consists of the CE letter pair and, if applicable, the four digit identification number of the notified body involved in the conformity assessment procedure.

== Overview ==
The CE mark on a product indicates that the manufacturer or importer of that product affirms its compliance with the relevant EU legislation and the product may be sold anywhere in the European Economic Area (EEA). It is a criminal offence to affix a CE mark to a product that is not compliant or to offer such a product for sale.

For example, most electrical products must comply with the Low Voltage Directive and the EMC Directive, among others; toys must comply with the Toy Safety Directive. (The Low Voltage Directive is about electrical safety; EMC or Electromagnetic Compatibility means the device will work as intended without interfering with, or being affected by, the use or function of any other device.) The CE mark indicates compliance with as many norms (directives and regulations) as apply at the time of the declaration of compliance (see below). In the case of electrical products, several later norms such as the Restriction of Hazardous Substances Directive (RoHS) and Waste Electrical and Electronic Equipment Directive (WEEE) are relevant in addition to the Low Voltage Directive and EMC Directive. The exact significance of the CE mark therefore depends on when it was applied to a specific unit.

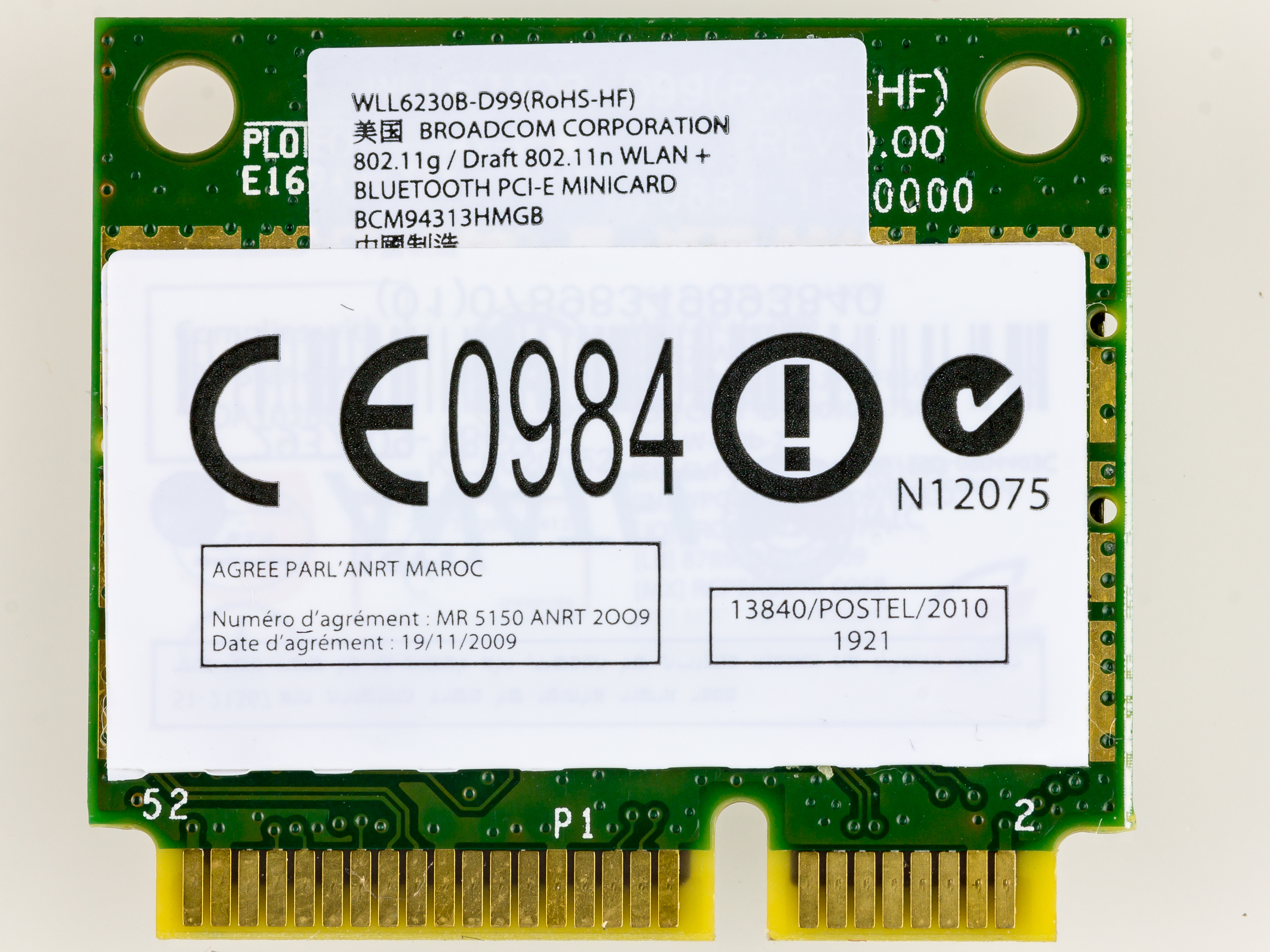
Example of the CE mark followed by the registration number of a notified body

The marking does not indicate EEA manufacture or that the EU or another authority has approved a product as safe or conformant. The EU requirements may include safety, health, and environmental protection. If stipulated in any EU product legislation, assessment by a Notified Body or manufacture according to a certified production quality system may be required. Where relevant, the CE mark is followed by the registration number of the notified body involved in conformity assessment.

Not all products need CE marking to be traded in the EEA; only product categories subject to relevant directives or regulations are required (and allowed) to bear CE marking. Most CE-marked products can be placed on the market subject only to an internal production control by the manufacturer (Module A; see Self-certification, below), with no independent check of the conformity of the product with EU legislation; ANEC has cautioned that, amongst other things, CE marking cannot be considered a "safety mark" for consumers.

== Meaning of CE ==
Although it has been suggested that the CE letter pair is an abbreviation of conformité européenne (as used, for example, in a written question in the European Parliament), this meaning appears to be a backronym. None of the defining EU Directives or EU Regulations give this association. When the Commission replied to the written question, they did not repeat or acknowledge those words. However, in a 2014 press release, the Commission gave CE as an abbreviation of conformité européenne. This is the only quasi-validation of the term that has been publicly released by a European authority.

== Countries requiring CE marking ==
CE marking is mandatory for certain product groups intended for sale within the European Union, the European Free Trade Association (EFTA), and Turkey. As Northern Ireland (a region of the UK) remains aligned to the European Single Market under the Northern Ireland Protocol, CE marking remains mandatory for products placed on the market there, and the British UKCA mark is not required.

CE marking was not required by countries of the Central European Free Trade Agreement (CEFTA), but CEFTA members Albania, North Macedonia, Serbia, and Montenegro had applied for membership of the European Union, and were adopting many of its standards within their legislation, as had most Central European former member countries of CEFTA that joined the EU, before joining.

As of 2019, the United Kingdom government "intends to extend recognition of the CE marking for placing most goods on the market in Great Britain, indefinitely, beyond December 2024", with "different rules for medical devices, construction products, cableways, transportable pressure equipment, unmanned aircraft systems, rail products, marine equipment and ecodesign".

== Rules underlying CE marking ==
The formal legal status of the CE mark is set out in various EU Directives and Regulations. The underlying principles are explained in the Commission's "Blue Guide".

Responsibility for CE marking lies with whoever puts the product on the market in the EU, i.e. an EU-based manufacturer, the importer or distributor of a product made outside the EU, or an EU-based office of a non-EU manufacturer.

The manufacturer of a product affixes the CE marking to it but has to take certain obligatory steps before the product can bear CE marking. The manufacturer must carry out a conformity assessment, set up a technical file, and sign a Declaration stipulated by the leading legislation for the product. The documentation has to be made available to authorities on request.

Importers of products have to verify that the manufacturer outside the EU has undertaken the necessary steps and that the documentation is available upon request. Importers should also make sure that contact with the manufacturer can always be established.

Distributors must be able to demonstrate to national authorities that they have acted with due care and they must have affirmation from the manufacturer or importer that the necessary measures have been taken.

If importers or distributors market the products under their own name, they take over the manufacturer's responsibilities. In this case they must have sufficient information on the design and production of the product, as they will be assuming the legal responsibility when they affix the CE marking.

There are certain rules underlying the procedure to affix the marking:

- Products subject to certain EU directives or EU regulations providing for CE marking have to be affixed with the CE marking before they can be placed on the market.
- Manufacturers have to check, on their sole responsibility, which EU legislation they need to apply for their products.
- The product may be placed on the market only if it complies with the provisions of all applicable directives and regulations and if the conformity assessment procedure has been carried out accordingly.
- The manufacturer draws up an EU declaration of conformity or a declaration of performance (for Construction Products) and affixes the CE marking on the product.
- If stipulated in the directive(s) or regulation(s), an authorized third party (Notified Body) must be involved in the conformity assessment procedure or in setting up a production quality system.
- If the CE marking is affixed on a product, it can bear additional markings only if they are of different significance, do not overlap with the CE marking and are not confusing and do not impair the legibility and visibility of the CE marking.

A guide to the implementation of directives and regulations based on the New Approach and the Global Approach (the "Blue Guide") was first published by the European Union in 2000. Updated versions were published on 28 February 2014 and 26 July 2016.

== Self-certification ==
Depending on the level of risk of the product, the CE marking is affixed to a product by the manufacturer or authorized representative who needs to ensure that the product meets all the CE marking requirements. In some cases, if a product has minimal risk, it can be self-certified by a manufacturer making a declaration of conformity and affixing the CE marking to their own product. Self-certification exists only for products that have a minimal risk for their use, and this is clearly foreseen in the relevant directive and regulation according to the product "category". In order to certify, the manufacturer must do several things:

1. Investigate whether the product needs to have a CE marking. The product must conform to all Directives and Regulations that apply to the product.
2. Choose the conformity assessment procedure from the modules called out by the directive or the regulation for the product according to each category (level of risk) involved. There are several modules available for the Conformity Assessment Procedures, but only a few of them involve self-certification. The most of these procedure require a "type Approval" and a Production conformity assessment by a Notified Body. All procedures (modules) of certification are as listed below which are derivered from Article 5.1.7 of "Blue Guide". A product normally needs more than one procedure (Module) to be implemented:

- Module A – Internal production control.
  - Module A1 – Internal production control plus supervised product testing
  - Module A2 – Internal production control plus supervised product checks at random intervals
- Module B – EU type examination.
- Module C – Conformity to EU type based on internal production control
  - Module C1 – Conformity to EU type based on internal production control plus supervised product testing
  - Module C2 – Conformity to EU type based on internal production control plus supervised product testing
- Module D – Conformity to EU type based on quality assurance of the production process.
  - Module D1 – Quality assurance of the production process.
- Module E – Conformity to EU type based on product quality assurance
  - Module E1 – Quality assurance of final product inspection and testing
- Module F – Conformity to EU type based on product verification.
  - Module F1 - Conformity based on product verification.
- Module G – Unit verification.
- Module H – Full quality assurance.
  - Module H1 – Full quality assurance and Design Examination.

The level of risk is defined by the "category" of each equipment. The higher the category, the higher the risk. After defining the category, the manufacturer, in order to obtain certification, shall then apply the relevant procedures for the specific category of the product or choose the relevant procedures for a higher-category product. The manufacturer, after insuring that the relevant modules for the product category have been applied, will affix the CE mark and draw up a Declaration of Conformity. The Declaration of Conformity contains a description of the product, the directive(s) and regulation(s) applied, the product category for each directive or regulation, the module chosen, and the name and registration number of the notified body involved in certification procedures (models).

Notified bodies involved in certification procedures are organizations that have been nominated by a member state (according to an accreditation procedure) and have been notified by the European Commission. These notified bodies act as Independent Inspection organizations and carry out the procedures as listed in the relevant Modules applied as stated by the relevant directives and regulations. A manufacturer can choose any notified body (notified for the certain directive or regulation and relevant Modules) in any Member State of the European Union.

In reality, the self-certification process consists of the following stages:

Stage 1: Identify the applicable norm(s)

The first step is to identify whether the product needs to bear CE marking or not. Not all products are required to bear CE marking, only the products that fall within the scope of at least one of the sectoral norms (directives and regulations) requiring CE marking. There are more than 20 sectoral product norms requiring CE marking covering, but not limited to, products such as electrical equipment, machines, medical devices, toys, pressure equipment, PPE, wireless devices and construction products.

Identifying which norm(s) may be applicable, as there may be more than one, involves a simple exercise of reading the scope of each norm to establish which apply to the product (Such as the "Low Voltage Directive," 2014/35/EU). If the product does not fall within the scope of any of the sectoral norm, then the product does not need to bear CE marking (and, indeed, must not bear CE marking).

Stage 2: Identify the applicable requirements of the norm(s)

Each norm has slightly different methods of demonstrating conformity depending on the classification of the product and its intended use. Every Directive or Regulation has a number of 'essential requirements' that the product has to meet before being placed on the market.

The best way to demonstrate that these essential requirements have been met is by meeting the requirements of an applicable 'harmonised standard,’ which offer a presumption of conformity to the essential requirements, although the use of standards usually remains voluntary. Harmonised standards can be identified by searching the 'Official Journal' on the European Commission's website, or by visiting the New Approach website established by the European Commission and EFTA with the European Standardisation Organisations.

Stage 3: Identify an appropriate route to conformity

The process is not always a self-declaration process, there are various 'attestation routes' to conformity depending on the Directive or Regulation and classification of the product. Many products (such as invasive medical devices, or fire alarm and extinguisher systems, Pressure Equipment, Lifts etc.) in most cases, have a mandatory requirement for the involvement of an authorised third party e.g. a "notified body".

There are various attestation routes which include:

- An assessment of the product by the manufacturer.
- An assessment of the product by the manufacturer, with additional requirement for mandatory factory production control audits to be carried out by a third party.
- An assessment by a third party (e.g. EC type test), with the requirement for mandatory factory production control audits to be carried out by a third party.

Stage 4: Assessment of the product's conformity

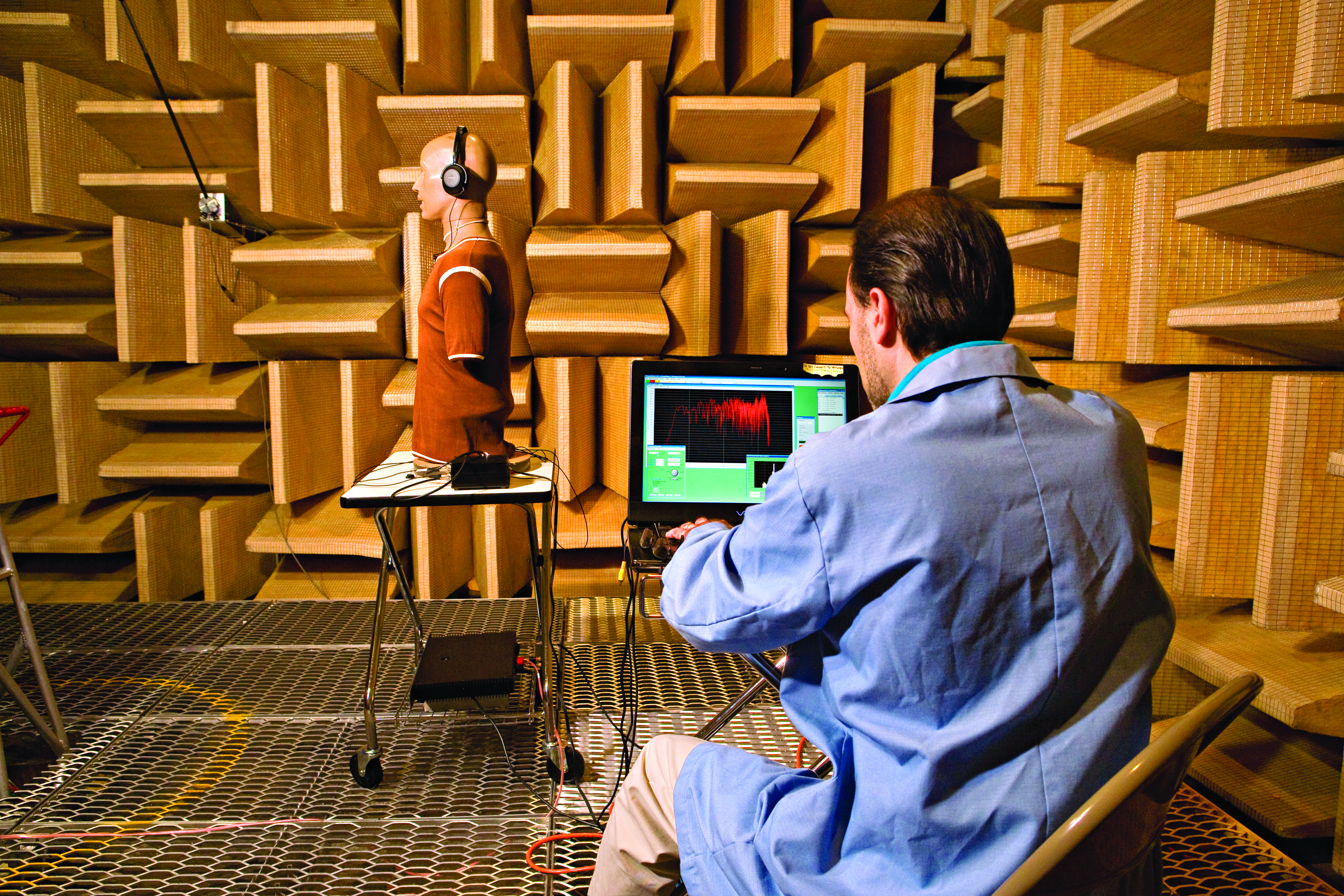
Example of safety product testing: headphones in anechoic chamber.

When all of the requirements have been established, the conformity of the product to the essential requirements of the norm(s) needs to be assessed. This usually involves assessment and/or testing, and may include an evaluation of the conformity of the product to the harmonised standard(s) identified in step 2.

Stage 5: Compile the technical documentation

Technical documentation, usually referred to as the technical file, relating to the product or range of products needs to be compiled. This information should cover every aspect relating to conformity and is likely to include details of the design, development and manufacture of the product.

Technical documentation will usually include:

- Technical description
- Drawings, circuit diagrams and photos
- Bill of materials
- Specification and, where applicable, EU declaration of conformity for the critical components and materials used
- Details of any design calculations
- Test reports and/or assessments
- Instructions
- EU declaration of conformity
- Technical documentation can be made available in any format (i.e. paper or electronic) and must be held for a period of up to 10 years after the manufacture of the last unit, and in most cases reside in the European Economic Area (EEA).

Stage 6: Make a declaration and affix the CE marking

When the manufacturer, importer or authorised representative is satisfied that their product conforms to the applicable norms, an EU declaration of conformity must be completed or, for partly completed machinery under the Machinery Directive, an ECU declaration of incorporation.

== EU declaration of conformity ==
Under the General Product Safety Regulation (EU) 2023/988 (GPSR), the EU declaration of conformity is a mandatory legal document in which the manufacturer or authorised representative declares that a product complies with all applicable safety requirements.

The EU declaration of conformity must include:

- Manufacturer’s or authorised representative’s name and full business address.
- Product identification (type, model, serial or batch number).
- A statement that the signatory accepts full responsibility for compliance with the applicable EU legislation.
- Traceability information (e.g., photograph or drawing of the product).
- Reference to relevant regulations (e.g., GPSR, and if applicable CE‑directives) and harmonised standards used.
- Identification of any notified body involved, with its name and identification number, if applicable.
- Place and date of issue.
- Name and position of the person authorised to sign on behalf of the manufacturer or authorised representative.
- A legally binding signature.

Additional requirements:

- The declaration must be drafted before placing the product on the EU market and retained for at least 10 years thereafter by the manufacturer, importer, or authorised representative.
- It must be translated into the official language(s) of each EU country where the product is sold.

The declaration is part of the product’s technical documentation and must be submitted to competent authorities on request.

== Product groups ==
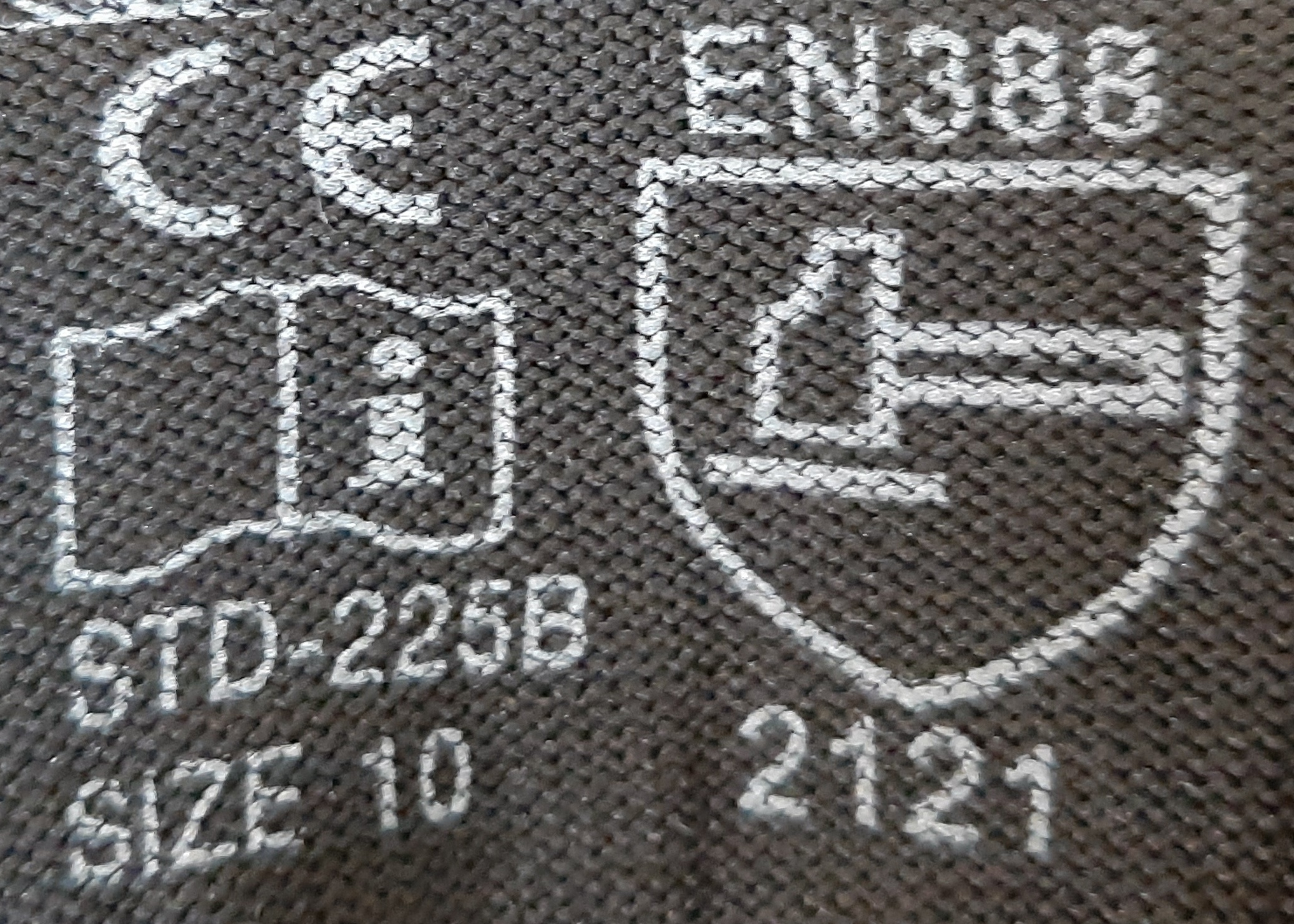
CE mark on personal protective equipment (a glove)

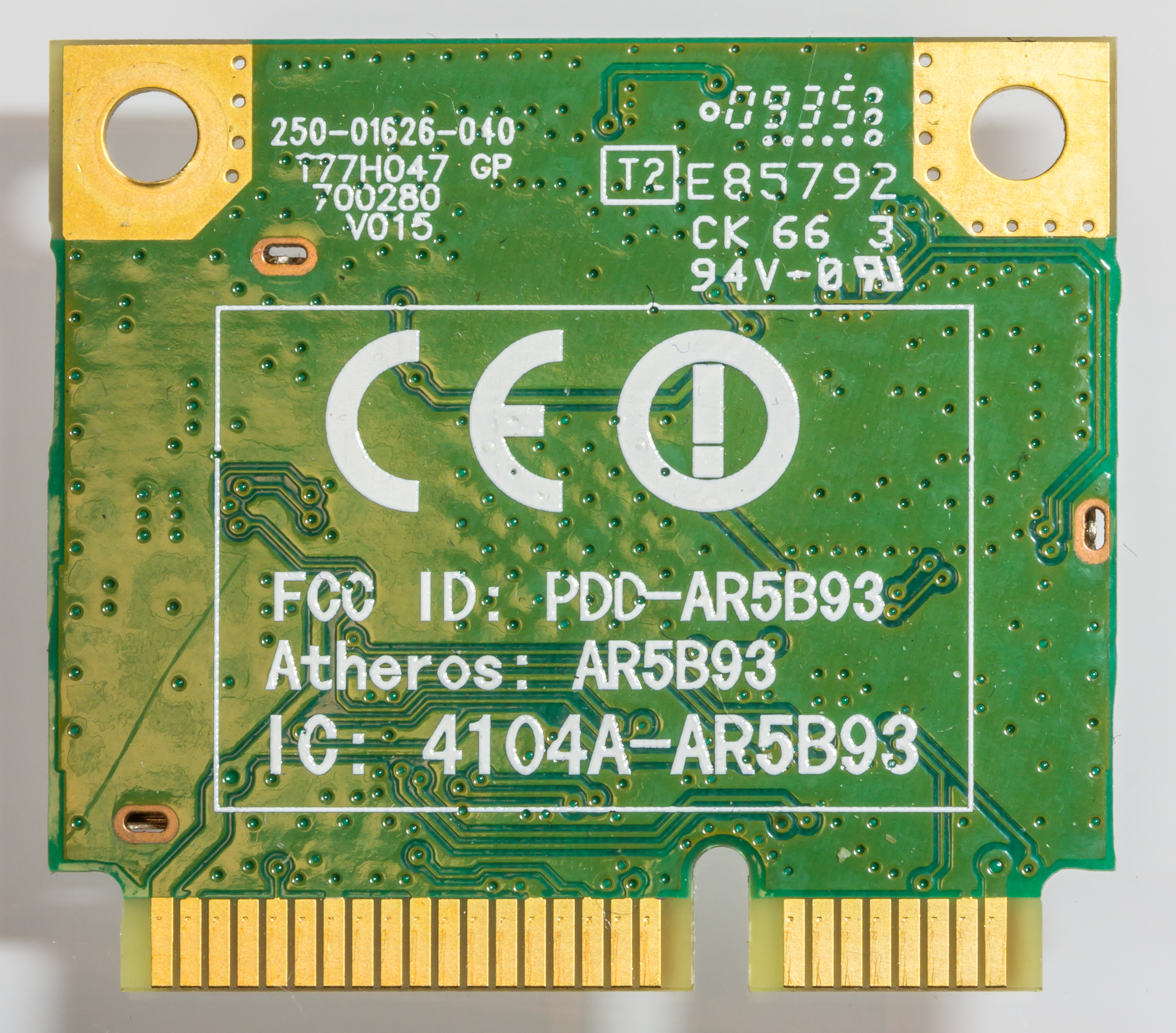
CE mark on radio equipment (a Wi‑Fi card)

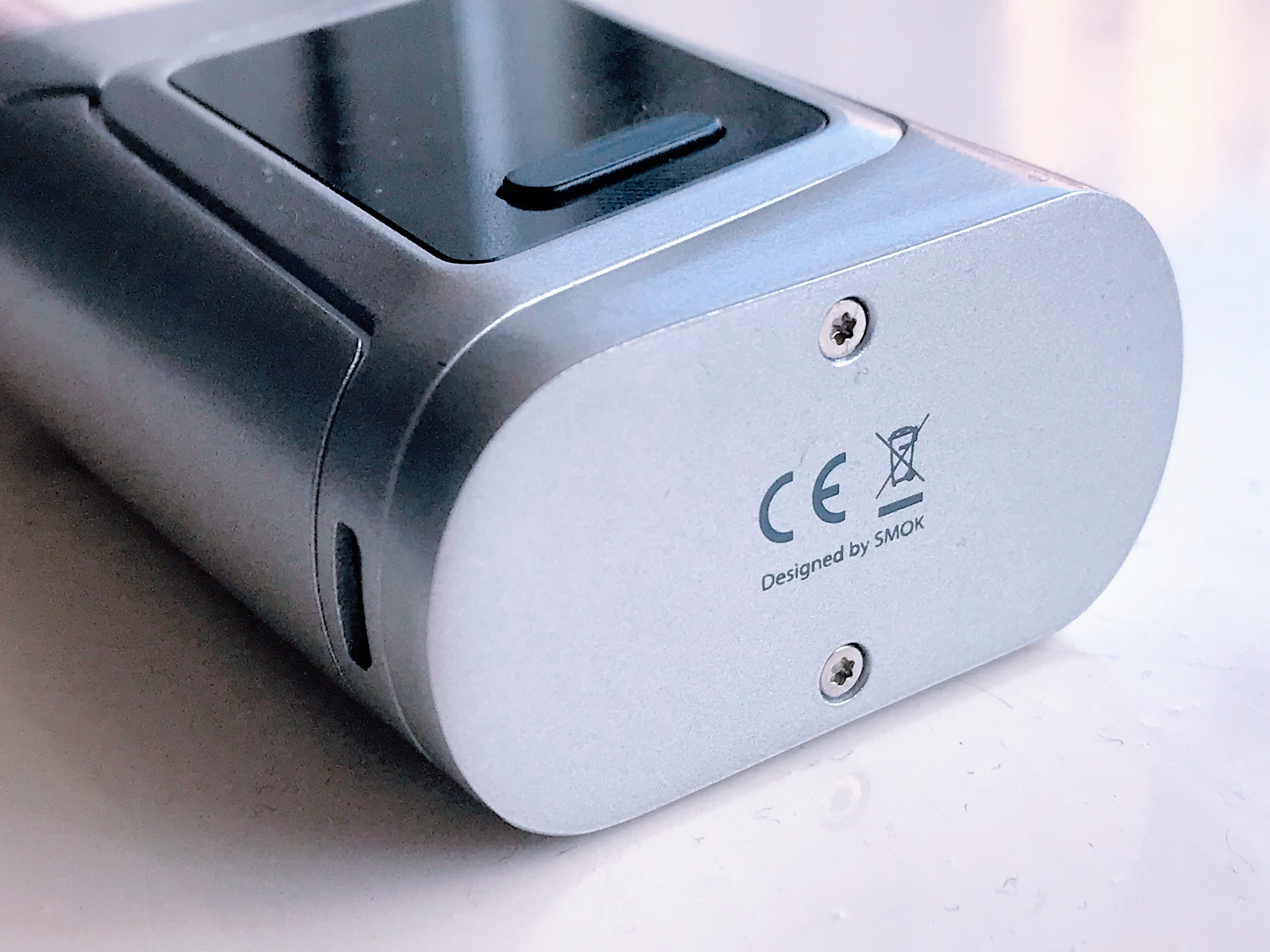
CE mark on electronic equipment (electronic cigarette)

The norms (directives and regulations) requiring CE marking affect the following product groups:

- Active implantable medical devices (excludes surgical instruments)
- Appliances burning gaseous fuels
- Cableway installations designed to carry persons
- Construction products according to Regulation (EU) 2024/3110, which applies from 8 January 2026 and repeals Regulation (EU) No. 305/2011 in stages; harmonised standards cited under the 2011 regulation that were in force on 8 January 2026 remain valid until they are withdrawn
- Eco-design of energy related products
- Electrical and electronic equipment, including radio equipment
- Equipment and protective systems intended for use in potentially explosive atmospheres
- Explosives for civil uses
- Fertilizers Regulation (EU) No. 1009/2019
- Hot-water boilers
- In vitro diagnostic medical devices
- Lifts
- Machinery
- Measuring instruments
- Medical devices
- Noise emission in the environment
- Non-automatic weighing instruments
- Personal protective equipment
- Pressure equipment
- Pyrotechnics
- Recreational craft
- Restriction of the use of certain hazardous substances in electrical and electronic equipment (RoHS)
- Toys
- Simple pressure vessels

== Mutual recognition of conformity assessment ==
There are numerous 'Agreements on Mutual Recognition of Conformity Assessment' between the European Union and other countries such as the US, Japan, Canada, Australia, New Zealand and Israel. Consequently, CE marking is now found on many products from these countries. Japan has its own marking known as the Conformity Mark.

Switzerland and Turkey (which are not members of the EEA) also require products to bear CE marking as an affirmation of conformity.

== Characteristics of CE marking ==
Proportion requirements of the CE marking

- The CE marking has to be affixed by the manufacturer or its authorized representative in the European Union according to its legal format visibly, legibly and indelibly to the product
- When a manufacturer puts the CE marking on a product it implies that it complies with all the Essential Health and safety requirements from all the directives and regulations that applies to its product.
  - For example, for a machine, generally the Machinery directive applies, but often also:
    - Low voltage directive
    - EMC directive
    - sometimes other directives or regulations, e.g. ATEX directive
    - and sometimes other legal requirements, e.g. for food contact materials.

When the manufacturer of a machine puts the CE marking, it engages itself and guarantees, that it makes all the tests, assessments and evaluation on the product to conform to all the requirements of all the norms that apply to its product.

- CE marking has been introduced by the COUNCIL DIRECTIVE 93/68/EEC of 22 July 1993 amending Directives 87/404/EEC (simple pressure vessels), 88/378/EEC (safety of toys), 89/106/EEC (construction products), 89/336/EEC (electromagnetic compatibility), 89/392/EEC (machinery), 89/686/EEC (personal protective equipment), 90/384/EEC (non-automatic weighing instruments), 90/385/EEC (active implantable medicinal devices), 90/396/EEC (appliances burning gaseous fuels), 91/263/EEC (telecommunications terminal equipment), 92/42/EEC (new hot-water boilers fired with liquid or gaseous fuels), 93/42/EEC (medical devices) and 73/23/EEC (electrical equipment designed for use within certain voltage limits).
- The size of the CE marking must be at least 5 mm, if enlarged its proportions have to be kept.
- If the appearance and workmanship of a product do not allow for the CE marking to be affixed on the product itself, the marking has to be affixed to its packaging or accompanying documents.
- If a norm requires the involvement of a Notified Body in the conformity assessment procedure, depending on the legislation, an identification number may need to be put behind the CE logo. This is done under the responsibility of the Notified Body.

== Misuse ==
The European Commission is aware that CE markings, like other certifications marks, are misused. CE marking is sometimes affixed to products that do not fulfill the legal requirements and conditions, or it is affixed to products for which it is not required. In one case it was reported that "Chinese manufacturers were submitting well-engineered electrical products to obtain conformity testing reports, but then removing non-essential components in production to reduce costs". A test of 27 electrical chargers with UK sockets in 2008 found that all the eight legitimately branded ones with a reputable name met safety standards, but none of those unbranded or with minor names did, despite bearing the CE mark; non-compliant devices were actually potentially unreliable and dangerous, presenting electrical and fire hazards.

There are also cases in which the product complies with the applicable requirements, but the form, dimensions, or proportions of the mark itself are not as specified in the legislation.

=== "China Export" myth ===
Comparison of a CE mark and an alleged "China Export" mark

In 2008, a logo very similar to CE marking was alleged to exist and to stand for China Export because some Chinese manufacturers apply it to their products. However, the European Commission says that this is a misconception. The matter was raised at the European Parliament in 2008. The Commission responded that it was unaware of the existence of any "Chinese Export" mark and that, in its view, the misunderstanding had arisen because a producer had failed to respect the precise dimensions and proportions of the mark as prescribed in the legislation. The Commission was also aware of fraudulent misuse of the mark on products that did not comply with the standards, but that this is a separate issue. It had initiated the procedure to register CE marking as a Community collective trademark, and was in discussion with Chinese authorities to ensure compliance with EU legislation. Chinese (and other non-EU) manufacturers are permitted to use the CE mark provided that the goods have been manufactured in accordance with the relevant EU directives and regulations.

Nevertheless, and despite the Commission's assurance that it is without foundation, this urban myth continues to propagate on many websites.

In March 2017, another question was put to the European Commission on the statistics of the fraudulent use of the CE mark, reasserting the "China Export" myth. In reply, the Commission notes that it is the responsibility of Member States to take legal action on infringements; the Commission does not have statistics on the penalties that were imposed by Member States for the improper use of the CE marking.

In an IEEE conference paper studying the origins and evolution of the claim, the author concludes there is no evidence of a fraudulent "China Export" sign. In addition, similar "fraudulent" marking can be found in many European and American made products which do not show apparent noncompliance. Typesetting C and E too near to each other is probably just a typesetting mistake. The possibly earliest mention of "China Export" can be found on a Finnish fishing-themed discussion forum on year 2004. The author suspects the origins start from a joke: someone has invented a funny meaning for the abbreviation CE, from which the claim has evolved as oral history and turned into a widespread myth. Repeating the myth as a European parliamentary question has reinforced the credibility of the myth.

=== Domestic plugs and sockets ===
Directive 2014/35/EU, the "Low Voltage Directive", specifically excludes (amongst other things) plugs and socket outlets for domestic use which are not covered by any Union norm and therefore should not be CE marked. Throughout the EU, as in other jurisdictions, the control of plugs and socket outlets for domestic use is subject to national regulations.

It is fairly common to see domestic sockets (and adaptors) that have an inbuilt 5 volt USB-A power supply socket in addition to conventional 'two-pin + earth' AC sockets. These sockets must be CE marked, but the CE mark applies to the 5 volt converter only and not the rest of the socket or adaptor. This is comparable to dedicated 5 volt power supplies.

=== Legal implications ===
There are mechanisms in place to ensure that the CE marking is put on products correctly. Controlling products bearing CE marking is the responsibility of public authorities in member states, in cooperation with the European Commission. Citizens may contact national market surveillance authorities if the misuse of the CE marking is suspected or if a product's safety is questioned.

In the UK, sale of any product that carries a CE mark that is not so approved, or outside the scope of approval is a specific offence under Section 1 of the Trade Descriptions Act 1968. The seller of such an article is as equally guilty as the manufacturer or importer. Ignorance as to the true status of the sold item is no defence against a prosecution (strict liability). Under the Act, the misrepresentation is that the sold item conforms to a specification that it does not or that there is no such specification to which it can conform.

The procedures, measures and sanctions applying to counterfeiting of the CE marking vary according to the respective member state's national administrative and penal legislation. Depending on the seriousness of the crime, economic operators may be liable to a fine and, in some circumstances, imprisonment. However, if the product is not regarded as an imminent safety risk, the manufacturer may be given an opportunity to ensure that the product is in conformity with the applicable legislation before being forced to take the product off the market.

== Use in computer systems ==
The mark does not have a Unicode code point. According to the Unicode principles, rendering the mark is a computer font design choice for the two ordinary upper-case letters, C and E, with a specific kerning arrangement. The exact geometry that constitutes the mark is provided in the vector graphics files available from the European Commission.

== See also ==
- New Legislative Framework

=== Motor vehicles ===
On motor vehicles and related parts, the United Nations Economic Commission for Europe's type approval can overrule some EU legislation, so the "e mark" or "E mark", is often seen instead of the CE logo. Unlike the CE logo, the United Nations marks are not self-certified.

=== Reversed epsilon ===
A mark called the "reversed epsilon" (ɜ) predates the CE mark but continues to be required on aerosol sprays and measuring container bottles. (Note: The mark is not the number U+0033 3 DIGIT THREE but U+025C ɜ LATIN SMALL LETTER REVERSED OPEN E)

=== Other ===
- Country of origin – Country of manufacture, production, or growth
- Eurasian Conformity mark – Mark to certify conformity (EAC) – The Eurasian Economic Union's conformity mark
- European Organisation for Technical Approvals – Drafts EU Technical Assessment documents
- FCC mark – Voluntary declaration of conformity (US)
- Food and Drug Administration – Federal agency of the United States Department of Health and Human Services (US FDA)
- Geprüfte Sicherheit – German product safety certification mark (GS)
- Gulf Conformity mark – GGC product conformity mark (G-mark)
- Kitemark – UK product and service quality trade mark
- Regulatory Compliance Mark – Claim of compliance with Australian and New Zealand regulatory requirements
- Turkish Standards Institution – Turkish standards development organization (TSE)
- UKCA marking – Declaration of conformity with British standards - UK conformity mark
- estimated sign – Mark (℮) to declare approximate contents
