= China Compulsory Certificate =

Certification mark

CCC Mark

The China Compulsory Certificate mark (中国强制性产品认证, lit. 'China mandatory product certification'), commonly known as CCC Mark (三C认证), is a compulsory safety mark for many products imported, sold or used in the Chinese market. It was implemented on May 1, 2002, and became fully effective on August 1, 2003.

It is the result of the integration of China's two previous compulsory inspection systems, namely CCIB (Safety Mark, introduced in 1989 and required for products in 47 product categories) and CCEE (also known as Great Wall Mark, for electrical commodities in 7 product categories), into a single procedure. The CCC Mark is intended to be a minimum quality assurance for safety and health, not an optimal or high standard.

== Applicable products ==
The CCC Mark is required for both Chinese-manufactured and foreign-imported products; the certification process involves the Guobiao standards (or just GB standards).

The mandatory products include, among others:

1. Electrical wires and cables
2. Circuit switches, electric devices for protection or connection
3. Low-voltage Electrical Apparatus
4. Low power motors
5. Electric tools
6. Welding machines
7. Household and similar electrical appliances
8. Audio and video apparatus (not including the audio apparatus for broadcasting service and automobiles)
9. Information technology equipment
10. Lighting apparatus (not including the lighting apparatus with the voltage lower than 36V)
11. Motor vehicles and safety accessories
12. Motor vehicle Tires
13. Safety Glasses
14. Agricultural Machinery
15. Telecommunication Terminal Products
16. Fire Fighting Equipment
17. Safety Protection Products
18. Wireless LAN products
19. Decoration Materials
20. Toys

== Implementation rules ==
Apart from the GB standard, the implementation rules are the second important component that form the basis of CCC certification. The implementation rules determine the process of CCC certification and list the mandatory products for the certification. Based on many regulatory amendments, it is important to get the latest version of the implementation rules before starting the certification process.

In 2014, a comprehensive regulatory amendment of the Implementation Rules had taken place. The major changes are:

- Amendments for Automotive Parts
- Introduction of factory levels (A-D)
- Self-made products for end products do not require a CCC Certificate anymore

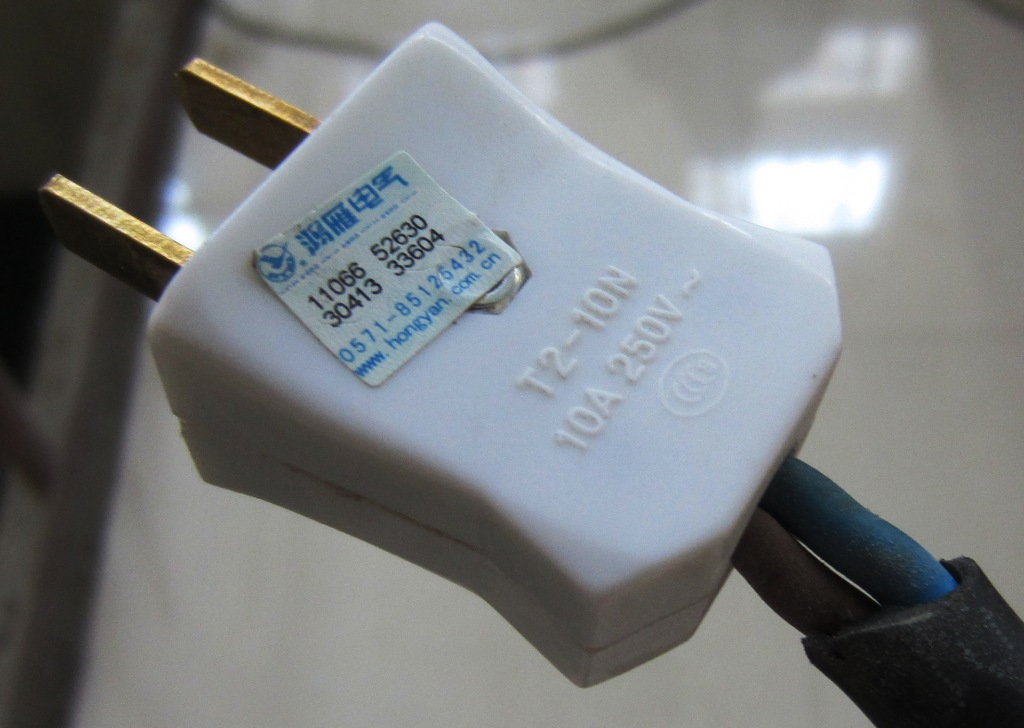
A parallel blade plug, similar in appearance to a Type A but rated 10 amps and 250 volts, carrying the CCC mark

== Administration ==
The CCC Mark is administered by the Certification and Accreditation Administration of the People's Republic of China (CNCA). The China Quality Certification Center (CQC) is designated by CNCA to process CCC Mark applications and defines the products that need CCC. The products are summed up in overall product categories. Additionally, the following certification authorities are responsible for specific groups of products:

- CCAP (China Certification Centre for Automotive Products) products in the automotive area
- CSP (China Certification Center for Security and Protection) certifies security products, forensic technology and products for road safety
- CSCG (China Safety Global Certification Centre) for safety glass
- CEMC (China Certification Centre for Electromagnetic Compatibility) all electronic products

=== Follow-up certification ===
The CCC certificate and the Permission of Printing, which allows the manufacturer to mark the CCC-certified product with the CCC Mark, must be renewed annually in order to keep the validity of the certificate. The renewal can only be done through a follow-up certification. Part of the follow-up certification is a one-day factory audit.

== IT security products ==
On April 27, 2009, China announced 13 categories of the IT security sector products that must conform to the additional authority that was newly bestowed on the CCC (China Compulsory Certificate), and this requirement was to be put into effect on May 1, 2009. In view of the security measures taken by China, there was a seemingly high likelihood that they would request the full disclosure of all source codes running on any and all devices, imported or otherwise. The divulgence of such source codes is of great concern to countries like the US, Japan, the EU, and South Korea; all four asked China to reverse this decision and objected to the implementation of the Chinese plan. Thus, the certification agents were soon limited to the organizations and entities within China – a compromise of sorts. However, despite this restriction, there still arose other concerns as to whether source codes and trade secrets could be leaked to the private sectors. In response to these enduring concerns, China altered the previously planned CCC policy programme. Instead of administering broad and stringent encroachments upon the relevant categories of imports (primarily, computer technology), they decided to engage in an alternate regulatory action solely affecting government procurement projects, while simultaneously postponing the enactment of the policy programme to May 1, 2010. China also stated that the number of applicable CCC product categories is not to expand past the current 13 already in place.

== See also ==
- Guobiao (GB)
- Common Criteria
- National Development and Reform Commission
- CE marking (CE)
  - China Export (CE), an urban myth in Europe about a mark that does not exist
