= Bureau of Indian Standards =

Indian organization for developing standards

Statutory body (Bureau of Indian Standards Act, 2016) overview
- Formed: 1 April 1987; 39 years ago
- Preceding Statutory body (Bureau of Indian Standards Act, 2016): Indian Standards Institution
- Jurisdiction: India
- Headquarters: Manak Bhawan, Old Delhi
- Motto: Sanskrit: मानकः पथप्रदर्शकः, romanized: Mānakah Pathapradarsakah
- Ministers responsible: Pralhad Joshi; Banwari Lal Verma; Nimuben Bambhaniya
- Statutory body (Bureau of Indian Standards Act, 2016) executive: Sanjay Garg, IAS, Director General
- Parent Statutory body (Bureau of Indian Standards Act, 2016): Ministry of Consumer Affairs, Food and Public Distribution
- Website: bis.gov.in

The Bureau of Indian Standards (BIS) is India's National Standards Body under the Department of Consumer Affairs, Ministry of Consumer Affairs, Food & Public Distribution, Government of India. It's a statutory body created by the Bureau of Indian Standards Act, 2016, which came into effect on 12 October 2017. BIS formulates Indian standards, operates product, system and service certification schemes, including the ISI mark and the Compulsory Registration Scheme for electronics, administers hallmarking of gold and silver jewellery, and enforces the mandatory standards that the central government imposes through Quality Control Orders.

The organisation traces its origins to the Indian Standards Institution (ISI), established as a registered society by the Department of Industries and Supplies in January 1947, which the bureau superseded on 1 April 1987 under the Bureau of Indian Standards Act, 1986. The new Bureau of Indian Standards (BIS) Act 2016, notified on 22 March 2016, came into force on 12 October 2017. BIS represents India in the International Organisation for Standardization and the International Electrotechnical Commission and serves as India's inquiry point under the WTO Agreement on Technical Barriers to Trade.

Since 2020, the government has greatly expanded the range of products subject to compulsory BIS certification, which it represents as a means of improving quality and curbing sub-standard import. However, economist, trading partners, and small businesses have criticised aspects of the regime, including certification delays and the use of standards as non-tariff barriers, and the introduction of mandatory gold hallmarking in 2021 prompted a one-day strike by jewellers.

== History ==
=== Indian Standards Institution (1947 - 1987) ===
On 3 September 1946, the Department of Industries and Supplies issued a memorandum announcing the creation of the Indian Standards Institution, which came into being on 6 January 1947 as a society registered under the Societies Registration Act, 1860. The Indian Standards Institution (Certification Marks) Act, 1952 provided a statutory basis for certification, and in 1955-56 ISI launched the scheme under which it licensed manufacturers to apply the ISI mark to goods confirming to Indian standards. India has been represented in the International Organisation for Standardization first by ISI, and since 1987 by BIS.

=== Bureau of Indian Standards ===
The Parliament passed the Bureau of Indian Standards Act on 26 November 1986, establishing BIS as a body corporate that took over ISI's functions on 1 April 1987. the Bureau of Indian Standards Bill, 2015 was passed by the Rajya Sabha on 8 March 2016, it received Presidential Assent on 21 March 2016 and was brought into force on 12 October 2017, repealing the 1986 Act. The 2016 Act designates BIS as the National Standards Body, extends standardization to goods, services, processes, and systems. It allows the government to make standards compulsory on grounds of health, safety, environment, prevention of unfair trade practises, or national security, and permits simplified conformity-assessment schemes including self-declaration of conformity, enables mandatory hallmarking of precious-metal articles, strengthens penalties, and provides for a recall of non-conforming marked products.

== Governance and organization ==
The Minister in charge of the Ministry or Department having administrative control of the BIS is the ex-officio President of the BIS. BIS has 500-plus scientific officers working as Certification Officers, Member Secretaries of technical committees, and lab OIC's. As a National Standards Body, it has 25 members drawn from Central or State Governments, industry, scientific and research institutions, and consumer organisations. Its headquarters are in New Delhi, with regional offices in the Eastern Region at Kolkata, Southern Region at Chennai, Western Region at Mumbai, Northern Region at Chandigarh, and Central Region at Delhi and 20 branch offices. It also works as the WTO-TBT enquiry point for India.

== Standards ==
=== National Building Code ===
It is a comprehensive building code for regulating the building construction activities across the country which was first published in 1970. It was amended in 1983, 2005, and 2016. Preliminary Draft Amendment No. 1 to NBC 2005 Part 11 "Approach to Sustainability" was put into circulation a preliminary draft amendment and BIS accepted the feedback from people till 15 March 2013. The bureau published the National Building Construction Standards on 30 April 2026.

=== Quality Control Orders ===
The bureau's standards are voluntary unless the Government of India makes them mandatory for a product by issuing a Quality Control Order (QCO) under Section 16 of the Bureau of Indian Standards Act, 2016. Once mandatory, it is illegal to manufacture, import, distribute, sell, hire, lease, store, or exhibit for sale any product without a licence and relevant mark. Violating these restrictions is punishable by up to two years' imprisonment, or a fine, or both. The bureau has several ways to grant the licence:

- Scheme 1 (ISI mark with factory audit)
- Scheme 2 (registration based on self-declaration of conformity)
- Foreign Manufacturers Certification Scheme

The Indian government has significantly expanded the use of QCOs since 2020; the Centre for Social and Economic Progress, a New Delhi-based think tank, noted that QCOs rose from 88 in 2019 to 765 in 2024. The government has claimed that QCOs help Indian manufacturers improve product quality and access larger markets. However, economists have termed QCOs as technical barriers to trade and criticised them for reducing India's export competitiveness and imposing high licensing costs. A report from the NITI Aayog, a government think tank, found that QCOs have negatively affected the competitiveness of export-intensive and employment-generating sectors, such as footwear and electronics, by increasing the cost of key inputs. The World Trade Organization's Trade Concerns database has had over four dozen complaints against India since 2021, with most relating to QCOs on a variety of products.

== Organisation ==
=== National Institute of Training for Standardization (NITS) ===
It is a training institute of BIS which is set up in 1995. It is functioning from Noida, Uttar Pradesh, India.

The primary activities of NITS are:

- In-House and Open Training Programme for Industry
- International Training Programme for Developing Countries (Commonwealth countries)
- Training Programme to its employees.

=== Cells ===
==== Laboratories ====
To support the activities of product certification, BIS has a chain of 8 laboratories. These laboratories have established testing facilities for products of chemical, food, electrical and mechanical disciplines. Approximately, 25000 samples are being tested in the BIS laboratories every year. In certain cases where it is economically not feasible to develop test facilities in BIS laboratories and also for other reasons like overloading of samples, equipment being out of order, the services of outside approved laboratories are also being availed. Except for the two labs, all the other labs are NABL (National Accreditation Board for Testing and Calibration Laboratories) accredited. It operates a laboratory recognition scheme also.

==== Small Scale Industry Facilitation Cell ====
SSI Facilitation Cell became operational since 26 May 1997. The aim of the Cell is to assist the small scale entrepreneurs who are backbone of the Indian industry. It has an incentive scheme to promote such units to get certified with ISI Mark.

==== Grievance Cell ====
If any customer reports about the degraded quality of any certified product at Grievance Cell, BIS HQs, BIS gives redressal to the customer.

=== Collaboration with international standards bodies ===
BIS is a founder member of International Organization for Standardization (ISO). It represents India in the International Organization for Standardization (ISO), the International Electrotechnical Commission (IEC) and the World Standards Service Network (WSSN).

== Activities ==
=== Standard formulation and promotion ===
One of the major functions of the Bureau is the formulation, recognition and promotion of the Indian Standards. As on 1 January 2019, over 20,000 Standards have been formulated by BIS, are in force. These cover important segments of economy, which help the industry in upgrading the quality of their products and services.

BIS has identified 15 sectors which are important to Indian Industry. For formulation of Indian Standard, it has separate Division Council to oversee and supervise the work. The Standards are regularly reviewed and formulated in line with the technological development to maintain harmony with the International Standards.

=== Product Certification ===
Product certification is a process through which a third-party organization or certification body assesses and verifies that a product meets specific standards, specifications, or regulatory requirements. The primary purpose of product certification is to ensure that a product is safe, reliable, and compliant with the relevant quality and safety standards. It provides consumers with confidence that the product they are purchasing meets established criteria and has been independently tested and evaluated.

==== For Indian manufacturers ====
Product Certifications are to be obtained voluntarily. For, some of the products like Milk powder, Drinking Water, LPG Cylinders, and others, certification is mandatory. Because these products are concerned with health and safety.

==== For foreign manufacturers ====
ISI-Mark Logo

BIS Compulsory Registration Scheme (CRS) Standard Mark Logo

Foreign manufacturers of products who intend to export to India also may obtain a BIS product certification licence. For some products various Indian government ministries/departments/agencies makes its compulsory to have BIS certification. Towards this, BIS launched its Product Certification Scheme for overseas manufacturers in the year 2000, which is called Foreign Manufacturers Certification Scheme. Under the provisions of this scheme, foreign manufacturers can seek certification from BIS for marking their product(s) with BIS Compulsory Registration Scheme (CRS) Standard Mark. The foreign manufacturer needs to appoint an Authorized Indian Representative who will be an Indian Resident to act as an agent between BIS and the manufacturer. Depending on the product, the manufacturer has to imprint one of two possible marks on the product label—the CRS Standard Mark or the ISI Mark. The CRS Standard Mark is compulsory for certain types of electronics and IT goods, whereas the ISI mark is mandatory for product categories such as cement, household electrical products, food products, steel materials, etc. The ISI mark is also used for several voluntary BIS certification product categories.

==== For Indian importers ====
Indian importers who intend to get Certification Mark may apply for the licence. However, the assessment visit is paid to the original product manufacturer.

==== See also ====
- Certification marks in India
- ISI mark
- IS 800
- BIS hallmark
- Agmark
- FPO mark
- Quality Council of India
- Indian Patent Office
- List of technical standard organizations
- ISI Certification India
