= Indian Patent Office =

Government agency under Indian Ministry of Commerce and Industry

Office of the Controller General of Patents, Designs and Trademark

Agency overview
- Jurisdiction: Government of India
- Headquarters: Delhi, India
- Agency executive: Prof. (Dr) Unnat P. Pandit, Controller General of Patents, Designs & Trade Marks , Bouddhik Sampada Bhawan, Plot No. 32, Sector 14, Dwarka, New Delhi - 110078
- Parent department: Department for Promotion of Industry and Internal Trade Ministry of Commerce and Industry
- Website: https://ipindia.gov.in

The Office of the Controller General of Patents, Designs and Trade Marks (CGPDTM) generally known as the Indian Patent Office, is an agency under the Department for Promotion of Industry and Internal Trade which administers the Indian law of Patents, Designs and Trade Marks.

== History ==
=== Foundation ===
On 28 February 1856, the Government of India promulgated legislation to grant what was then termed as "exclusive privileges for the encouragement of inventions of new manufactures". On 3 March 1856, a civil engineer, George Alfred DePenning of 7, Grant's Lane, Calcutta petitioned the Government of India for grant of exclusive privileges for his invention — "An Efficient Punkah Pulling Machine". On 2 September, DePenning, submitted the Specifications for his invention along with drawings to illustrate its working. These were accepted and the invention was granted the first ever Intellectual Property protection in India.

=== Amendments to the Patents Act & Rules ===
Amendments (in 1999, 2002, 2005) were necessitated by India's obligations under TRIPS, allowing product patents in drugs and chemicals. A pre-grant representation in addition to the existing post-grant opposition has been re-introduced. A provision of later amendments was on software patent-ability, which was later withdrawn in another amendment in 2005. The amendment in 2012 focused on change in marks of Patent Agent Examination.

Indian Patent Rules were amended in 2003, 2005, 2006, 2012, 2013, 2014, 2016, 2018, 2019 and 2020. The 2006 amendment of rules introduced reduced time lines and a fee structure based on specification size and number of claims, in addition to a basic fee. Indian Patent amendment rules 2012 was for amendments in criteria for patent agent exam qualification. Gazette Notification of Patent (Amendments) Rules 2013 has made necessary provisions for recognizing Patent office as Examining authority and Searching authority on international level for filing, searching and examination of patent along with necessary fees. Patent amendment rules 2014 introduced a third category of applicant for small entities and revised the basic fee for filing a patent application. Patent amendment rule 2016 implemented on 16 May 2016, and introduced such as electronic communication to applicant/agent, and applicant can withdrawn their application using Form-29, and majorly introduced for the expedited examination for startup companies, and the timeline to put the grant of applicant has been reduced from 12 months to 6 months. In addition, video conference has been introduced for hearing the patent matters. Patent amendment rules 2019 introduced a patent agent shall submit all documents only by electronic transmission duly authenticated. Further, fee reductions for small entity, and fast track examination for specific applicants including female were introduced in 2019.

== Activities ==
=== Patent administration ===
Trends in Indian patents, 1997–2013, The number of biotech patents has doubled in a decade.

The CGPDTM reports to the Department for Promotion of Industry and Internal Trade (DPIIT) under the Ministry of Commerce and Industry and has five main administrative sections:

- Patent Office
- Designs Registry
- Trademarks Registry
- Geographical indications Registry
- Rajiv Gandhi National Institute of Intellectual Property Management (NIIPM)
- Patent Information System

The patent office is headquartered at Kolkata with branches in Chennai, New Delhi and Mumbai, but the office of the CGPDTM is in Mumbai. The office of the Patent Information System and National Institute for Intellectual Property Management is at Nagpur. The Controller General (CG), who supervises the administration of the Patents Act, the Designs Act, and the Trade Marks Act, also advises the Government on matters relating to these subjects. Shri. Unnat P. Pandit is the current CG and took charge in April 2022. Under the office of CGPDTM, a Geographical Indications Registry has been established in Chennai to administer the Geographical Indications of Goods (Registration and Protection) Act, 1999.

The Indian Patent Office has 667 Group A Gazetted officers, out of which 526 Patent Examiners, 97 Assistant Controllers, 42 Deputy Controllers, 1 Joint Controller, and 1 Senior Joint Controller, all of whom operate from four branches. Officer' Cadre of Indian Patent Office :

1. Controller General Of Patents & Design ( equivalent to Secretary to Government Of India/ Payband Level 15)

2. Senior Joint Controller Of Patents & Design ( equivalent to Additional Secretary to Government of India/ Payband Level 14)

3. Joint Controller Of Patents & Design ( equivalent to Senior Joint Secretary to Government of India/ Payband Level 13)

4. Deputy Controller of Patents & Design ( equivalent to Joint Secretary to Government Of India/ Payband Level 12)

5. Assistant Controller of Patents & Design (equivalent to Deputy Secretary to Government of India/ Payband Level 11)

6. Examiner Of Patents & Design ( equivalent to Under Secretary to Government of India/ Payband Level 10)

Although the designations of the Controllers differ, all of them (with the exception of the Controller General) have equal authority in administering the Patents Act. There are numerous other employees comes under Group B, C, D, works and operate from the four branches.
 An Indian Patent Examiner is mandated to search for prior art and for objections under any other ground as provided in the Patent's Act, then to report to the Controller, who has the power to either accept or reject Examiners' reports. Unlike the system at the USPTO /EPO/JPO, Examiners at IPO have only recommending power and the controllers are empowered by statute either to accept or refuse their recommendations. Examiners' reports to the Controller are not open to the public unless courts allow it (section 144 of the Patents Act). A Parliamentary committee has recommended repealing S144.[13][14][15]

=== Patent duration ===
Term of every patent in India is 20 years from the date of filing of patent application, irrespective of whether it is filed with provisional or complete specification. However, in case of applications filed under PCT the term of 20 years begins from the International filing date accorded under PCT.

Since the rights granted by an Indian Patent Office extends only throughout the territory of the India and ceases to have effect in a foreign country, an inventor who wishes patent protection in another country must apply for a patent in a specific country (according to its law) either through :PCT route or through conventional filing of application.

=== Patent Renewal and Restoration of Lapsed Patent ===
In order to keep the patent rights for the entire period, India's Patent Act has made it mandatory for the patent holders to pay a renewal fee. Once the patent is granted the patentee does not need to pay a renewal or maintenance fee for the first two years. The first renewal fee will be payable from the third year onwards. The patentee is also given a choice to pay the whole fees at a time or they can pay it every year. If in case the patent is not renewed by the company or individual, the patent ceases to exist and will be moved to the public domain. Once the subject matter that has been patented enters the public domain it is no longer protected and can be used by anyone without facing any suit or consequences of patent infringement.

Restoration of a lapsed patent is relatively time taking and a complex procedure. According to Section 60 of The Patents Act, 1970, an application for the restoration of the patent can be made by the patentee or their legal representative and the petition should be applied to the controller at the Indian Patent Office (IPO) within eighteen months from the date at which the patent ceases to have an effect. However, the application should contain a statement which states the reason behind the failure in paying the renewal fees and evidence which can be in the form of a letter, copy of documents or a deed. The applicant should also be ready to submit additional evidence regarding the same if asked by the controller. After examining all the information provided by the applicant, if the controller feels that the reason and the evidence provided by the applicant imply towards unintentional failure to pay the renewal fees then he/ she would publish the application and any person can oppose the restoration application within the prescribed period by filling form 14 and paying a fee. If in case the opposition gives a notice during the prescribed period then the controller would notify the applicant about the same and would give an opportunity to both the applicant and the controller to present their respective arguments before deciding the case. If no notice is given by the opposition or if the decision of the controller is in favor of the applicant if in case of the opposition, then upon payment of any unpaid additional and renewal fee the patent is restored.

=== Geographical Indications ===
India, as a member of the World Trade Organization (WTO), enacted the Geographical Indications of Goods (Registration & Protection) Act, 1999 has come into force with effect from 15 September 2003. GIs have been defined under Article 22(1) of the WTO Agreement on Trade-Related Aspects of Intellectual Property Rights (TRIPS) Agreement as: "Indications which identify a good as originating in the territory of a member, or a region or a locality in that territory, where a given quality, reputation or characteristic of the good is essentially attributable to its geographic origin."

The GI tag ensures that none other than those registered as authorised users (or at least those residing inside the geographic territory) are allowed to use the popular product name. In 2004–05, Darjeeling tea became the first GI tagged product in India and since then by July 2012, 178 had been added to the list.

=== Modernisation ===
The Indian Patent Office has implemented a modernisation program according to an Indian govt website. And according to this website "Efforts have been made to improve the working of the Patent Offices within the resources available and that the problem of backlog is also being attacked through 50% higher monthly target for disposal of patent applications per Examiner". E- Filing of Patents & Trademarks is made possible and according to an Indian Minister the first phase of the modernisation comes to an end and the Indian Patent office wishes to be an International search Authority. The second phase of modernisation has been proposed with the aim of achieving US patent examination efficiency among others. Patent filings during the year 2007–08 were 35218.

== Criticism ==
As per an Indian patent attorney, patents which were beyond the Act were granted by the office. The Indian Patent office had an unusually high grant rate for the year 2005–06 in respect of numbers of refused patent applications compared to other major patent offices. The monthly target for Indian examiners is 30 new and amended applications per month and the Indian Patent Office strictly has only 12 months to grant/refuse the application as compared to foreign patent offices where applicants can extend the final date indefinitely. Knowledge commission, an Indian Government appointed body has recommended measures regarding the functioning of the office.

There is a growing space of research literature about the Indian Patent regime, for example, in the context of how the working of pharmaceutical patents remains low in India, and how the Form 27 amendment does not sync with the reality of how it brings quality to Indian patents.

The controversial promotion of examiners as assistant controllers has led to an imbalance in the set-up with more controllers than examiners. Controller General had promised time-bound promotions to officers and recruitment of new examiners to mitigate the crisis of lack of officers and the problem of attrition due to low pay and lack of promotion. Cases of corruption have been reported. In 2012, only 137 out of the announced 257 candidates expressed interest to join. The monthly target for examiners are 15 new cases(FERs) and 25 disposals which has led to officers working under tremendous pressure to show output thereby affecting the quality of grant of patents. Indian patent examiners have the higher workload and the pay is amongst the lowest. While a patent examiner in the European Patent Office would handle less than seven patent applications per month and a USPTO examiner would handle eight applications per month, an Indian examiner reportedly handles at least 40 applications a month. However an Indian examiner's monthly salary is less than a third of his/her counterparts in other foreign patent offices. The issue of attrition due to lack of promotion to examiners was acknowledged by the Minister of Commerce and Industry Nirmala Sitharaman during IP day celebrations. A concerned government official recommended outsourcing of search in view of increased work load and the IPO has started to outsource prior-art searches violating the stipulations of the prevailing Patents Act. However, because of quality and legal issues with outsourcing, the outsourcing contracts were cancelled. The Department of Industrial Policy & Promotion under the Ministry of commerce, Government of India has come out with a discussion paper in order to address the issues plaguing the Indian Patent Office such as granting financial and administrative autonomy, separation of Patent and Trademark offices, setting up of additional offices are some of the issues put forth for input from stakeholders.

=== Accessibility ===
The IP Office in India has faced criticism for its lack of accessibility for Persons with Disabilities (PwDs). Historically, its systems did not comply with GIGW 3.0 guidelines and the BIS Standard (IS 17802). PwDs, especially those using screen readers, faced significant challenges in accessing online systems.

On 29 November 2021, Dr. Kalyan C. Kankanala, a Patent & Trademark Attorney with blindness, filed a writ petition in the Karnataka High Court (W.P. No. 21978/2021) demanding that the Office of Controller General of Patents, Designs & Trademarks (O/o CGPDTM) make its systems and websites accessible for PwDs. The petition highlighted the office's non-compliance with accessibility guidelines and requested accommodations such as OCR-readable documents and screen-reader compatibility.

In response to the petition, the O/o CGPDTM issued the *Guidelines for Accessibility and Reasonable Accommodations for Persons with Disabilities* on 4 March 2022. These guidelines included the following measures:

- Providing OCR-readable documents upon request by PwDs.
- Integration of audio captchas on websites.
- Conducting virtual hearings using Webex, a platform compatible with screen readers.
- Favorable consideration of adjournment requests made by PwDs due to accessibility issues.
- Initiating a project to make websites compliant with accessibility standards, subject to approvals.

On 17 September 2024, the Karnataka High Court disposed of the writ petition after noting that the petitioner’s concerns had been “substantially complied with.” The court acknowledged the measures taken by the office but highlighted that the full implementation of website accessibility would depend on the completion of ongoing projects and approval processes.

== See also ==
- Certification marks in India
- ISI mark
- BIS hallmark
- Agmark
- FPO mark
- Quality Council of India
- Bureau of Indian Standards
