= Certification marks in India =

Indian system for product's certification

India has a comprehensive system of product certifications governed by laws made by the Parliament of India at various times. These certifications are managed by various agencies, and hold various statuses before the law. Some of these marks are mandatory for such products to be manufactured or to be placed in the Indian market while some of the marks hold only an advisory status. All the industrial standardisation and industrial product certifications are governed by the Bureau of Indian Standards often abbreviated as BIS, the national standards organisation of India, while standards for other areas (like agricultural products) are developed and managed by other governmental agencies.

== Certification marks/Standardization marks ==
The state enforced certification marks presently in India are (alphabetical list):

- Agmark: for all agricultural products.
- BIS hallmark: certifies the purity of gold jewellery.
- Ecomark: an ecolabel for various products issued by the Bureau of Indian Standards. Voluntary and promotional.
- FPO mark: A mandatory mark for all processed fruit products in India. Certifies that the product was manufactured in a hygienic 'food-safe' environment.
- Geographical Indications marks: defined under the WTO Agreement on Trade-Related Aspects of Intellectual Property Rights (TRIPS), have been in force since 2003. Examples, include the Darjeeling tea and Basmati mark.
- India Organic certification mark: for organically farmed food products. Certifies that the product conforms to the specifications of National Standards for Organic Products, 2000 and any eventual amendments. The certification is issued by testing centres accredited by the Agricultural and Processed Food Products Export Development Authority (APEDA) under the National Program for Organic Production of the Government of India.
- ISI mark: for industrial product. Certifies that a product confirms to a set of standards laid by the Bureau of Indian Standards.
- BIS/CRS Standard mark: The Compulsory Registration Scheme (CRS) has been established in 2012 to regulate the quality of Information Technology (IT) and electronic products. Compulsory Registration Scheme is a mandatory scheme under BIS to ensure that specific categories of products meet stringent quality and safety criteria before being sold in the Indian market.
- Non Polluting Vehicle mark on motor vehicles: certifying conformity to the Bharat Stage emission standards.
- FSSAI: for all food products.

== Other marks ==
labels required by the law in India, but are not exactly certifications marks (alphabetical list).

- Toxicity label is mandatory on the containers of pesticides sold in India. It identifies the level of toxicity of the pesticide in four levels
- Either the Vegetarian mark (green dot symbol) or the Non-vegetarian mark (brown dot symbol) is mandatory for packaged food products to distinguish between vegetarian and non-vegetarian food.

== Non-statutory marks ==
There are other non-statutory certification marks or schemes in India which are promoted by the Government of India, by policy, or through governmental or semi-governmental agencies. But these certifications bear no legal status in the nation and are purely promotional in nature.

Examples of such certifications are:

- The Silk Mark Certifies that a piece of textile is pure silk. It is managed by the 'Silk Mark Organisation of India'.
- The Ayush Mark or the Ayush Product Certification Scheme for herbal products by the Department of Ayush.
- The Darjeeling tea certification mark, a geographical indication mark for tea produced in Darjeeling.

== See also ==
- List of Geographical Indications in India
