= State government response to the opioid epidemic in the United States =

Ongoing overuse of opioid medication in the US

In response to the surging opioid prescription rates by health care providers that contributed to the opioid epidemic in the United States, US states began passing legislation to stifle high-risk prescribing practices (such as prescribing high doses of opioids or prescribing opioids long-term). These new laws fell primarily into one of the following four categories:

1. Prescription Drug Monitoring Program (PDMP) enrollment laws: prescribers must enroll in their state's PDMP, an electronic database containing a record of all patients' controlled substance prescriptions
2. PDMP query laws: prescribers must check the PDMP before prescribing an opioid
3. Opioid prescribing cap laws: opioid prescriptions cannot exceed designated doses or durations
4. Pill mill laws: pain clinics are closely regulated and monitored to minimize the prescription of opioids non-medically

== Multi-state compact ==
In July 2016, governors from 45 US states and 3 territories entered into an interstate compact titled a "Compact to Fight Opioid Addiction" organized by Massachusetts Governor Charlie Baker where they agreed to adopt the strategies for addressing the opioid epidemic modeled after the policies implemented in Massachusetts. They agreed that collective action would be needed to end the opioid crisis, and they would coordinate their responses across all levels of government and the private sector, including opioid manufacturers and doctors.

== Responses by state ==
=== Alabama ===
In 2017 Alabama had the highest overall opioid prescribing rate in the US. The University of Alabama – Birmingham has made a commitment to battle the opioid epidemic. UAB's "Addiction Scholars Program" trains health care professionals - doctors, nurses, therapists, and social workers with insights into addiction in a 15-month course. The UAB School of Nursing offers "Nursing Competency Suites" with training on treating infants born to opioid-addicted mothers. The university also began an "Opioid Stewardship Committee" to "…consistently and frequently address opioid stewardship."

Opioid data for Alabama indicated that, from 2006 to 2014 2.3 billion pain pills were prescribed in the state. McKesson Corporation distributed 728 million of these pain pills; Par Pharmaceutical manufactured 713 million. The highest number of the pills went to Senior Care Pharmacy in Northport AL.

=== Arizona ===
Arizona's Governor Doug Ducey signed the Arizona Opioid Epidemic Act on January 26, 2018, to confront the state's opioid crisis. In Maricopa County which includes Phoenix, 3,114 overdoses were reported from June 15, 2017, through January 11, 2018. The law provides $10 million for treatment and limits an initial opioid prescription to five days with some exemptions. Arizona also implemented a new strategy of prescription drug monitoring programs in 2017. Since then, the number of opioid prescriptions filled has dropped nearly forty percent, while the number of opioid prescriptions written has dropped forty-three percent (King, 2018). The reductions in these numbers both show Arizona going in the right direction, although, even with the decrease, the number of deaths and overdoses continue to rise.

=== Arkansas ===
In October 2016, the state began the Arkansas Naloxone Project, a partnership of the State Drug Director's Office, DHS, and the Criminal Justice Institute (CJI) to allocate kits containing the nasal spray naloxone to first responders, schools, libraries, as well as drug treatment and recovery agencies to reverse the effects of opioid overdose. The project, funded by federal grants and the Arkansas Blue & You Foundation, distributed 7,000 kits and provided training to 8,000 individuals. Additionally, the Drug Director's Office and the CJI developed an app, nARcansas, a free opioid overdose training vehicle that shows how to administer the life-saving antidote and provide other information about opioids and overdoses, in both English or Spanish versions. The project has saved lives in almost half of Arkansas' 75 counties, with the most success in Pulaski County, the state's most populated.

=== California ===
In California, SB 482 took effect on October 2, 2018, requiring doctors and other healthcare professionals to check the Controlled Substance Utilization Review and Evaluation System, also known as CURES, before issuing any opioid prescriptions. SB 1109 was signed by Governor Jerry Brown in September 2018 (to take effect on January 1, 2019), requiring certain healthcare professionals undergo mandatory continuing education courses on the risk of addiction with opioids. In addition, this law would require outpatient pharmacies to apply warning labeling on all opioid prescription bottles cautioning patients of the risk of overdose and addiction associated with the drug. SB 1109 also targets vulnerable populations like students, requiring schools to provide students participating in youth sports or athletic programs with the CDC's Opioid Factsheet for Patients, that again address the risks of opioid use. In 2019, the city of San Francisco began a program called the Drug Overdose Prevention & Education (DOPE) Project, which trains individuals with substance use disorder, their families or anyone who may live in their communities who wants to help people suffering from overdoses. The DOPE Project, the largest single city naloxone-distribution effort in the US, instructs its advocates in the use of the nasal spray naloxone, an opioid reversal antidote. The group, able to save nearly 1,800 overdosing people in 2019, is currently challenged by the rise in fentanyl and methamphetamine use.

=== Colorado ===
Overdose death from the drug fentanyl increased by 300% from 2018 to 2019, according to the Denver Department of Public Health and Environment. Overall death from all drug overdoses increased slightly over the same time period. Denver has created an "early warning system" to let drug rehab organizations know if fentanyl has been found in the area's recreational drug supply. The Harm Reduction Action Center, one of those organizations, provides substance users with a needle exchange and fentanyl-testing strips. In 2016, then Colorado Attorney General Cynthia Coffman launched the Naloxone for Life Initiative which initially distributed 7,000 naloxone kits around the state. The state medical director then issued an order to make the drug available without prescription. Applying the drug has been successful. Denver's paramedics administered the opioid-overdose reversal drug to over 700 individuals in 2018. Colorado experienced a small decrease in opioid overdose deaths between 2017 and 2018.

=== Connecticut ===
In 2019 there were 1,200 opioid deaths in the state, a figure that will be reached shortly as 2020 has seen a 22% increase in opioid overdose mortality. The isolation of the COVID-19 pandemic, compounded by personal financial and other anxieties, has caused intense difficulty for people coping with addiction disorders as well as depression. Most traditional businesses have been affected by the pandemic, and the narcotic channel has remained active.

=== Delaware ===
Delaware, which has the 12th-highest overdose death rate in the US, introduced bills to limit doctors' ability to over-prescribe painkillers and improve access to treatment. In 2015, 228 people had died from overdose, which increased 35%—to 308—in 2016.

=== District of Columbia ===
The District began a program of free distribution of the nasal spray naloxone in 2018 with 17 locations dispensing the non-injection overdose-reversing drug. In 2020, due to a 50% increase in opioid overdose deaths, the District doubled the distribution to 35 locations in every ward throughout the city. The death statistics from D.C.'s Office of the Chief Medical Examiner are grim: 75% of overdose mortality are individuals 40–69, 70% are male, 84% are Black.

=== Florida ===
In 2011, Florida passed a law creating a program that would provide monitoring and enforcement against illegal diversion of prescription pills in Florida (sometimes called the "Flamingo Express"). The law had not yet been enacted when Governor Rick Scott took office, and Scott proposed to repeal it before it came into practice. Scott told reporters the program "had no state funding, is complicated by contract challenges, is unproven and could infringe on innocent people's privacy."

=== Georgia ===
The isolation accompanying the COVID-19 pandemic is hurting Georgians with opioid use disorder. Nationwide, overdoses of opioids jumped 42% in May 2020, according to the Overdose Detection Mapping Application Program, a United States government operation that tracks data from hospitals, ambulance, and police reports. The Georgia Council on Substance Abuse advised all first responders in the state to carry and be conversant with the administration of naloxone "…at all times." The nasal version of naloxone is critical for first responders during the pandemic as it can be dispensed at arm's length very quickly. The council further brought forth a substantial increase in Emergency Department visits due to opioid overdose. Because of the COVID-19 pandemic, individuals, they said, are missing personal counseling and 12-step meetings. The group also stated that calls to its CARES Warm line grew by 65 percent in three months with a higher intensity than ever experienced.

=== Hawaii ===
In 2020, the Overdose Detection Mapping Program noted an 18% increase in opioid overdoses, prompting the US Department of Health and Human Services (HHS) to provide Hawaii with a $2 million (US) grant to increase opioid use disorder treatments. The grant will be divided between the Hawaii State Rural Health Association and the West Hawaii Community Health Center to develop new addiction therapy programs or grow access to existing initiatives.

=== Illinois ===
The 2020 coronavirus pandemic resulted in a crisis within a crisis in Chicago as opioid overdose mortality doubled in the first five months of the year, compared to 2019 from 416 deaths to 924. Overdose deaths increased throughout the state, with the largest upturn in Cook County. Fentanyl, usually combined with heroin, was the drug at the center of 81% of the deaths, up from 74% in 2019.

=== Indiana ===
Indiana has been one of the states seriously affected by the epidemic. In 2015, 1,600 people died from drug overdose; 1,000 of those deaths were opioid-related. By 2017, opioid-related deaths had increased to over 1,200, followed by a small, measured decline since then. In 2018, drug overdose deaths fell 12.9%, almost three times the US average decline, as the state government focused on evidence-based, transformative programs to continue the decline. In 2020, SAMSHA provided a $1 million grant to the state of Indiana and its Social Services Administration to distribute the nasal spray naloxone to individuals in the state whom the ISSA determined were at risk from opioid overdose.

The Chief of Police of Lawrence, IN, (pop.40,000) ordered his officers to cease the administration of the opioid antagonist nasal spray naloxone during the Coronavirus pandemic, fearing that his first responders risk COVID-19 infection exposure by dispensing the intra-nasal drug. The Indiana Department of Homeland Security rejected the chief's order as not being evidence-based and encouraged the administration of the drug by the city's police. A near-by city, Ft. Wayne's (pop.267,000), police continue to disburse the drug which resulted in 233 individuals restored by Narcan in the first quarter 2020.

=== Kansas ===
In September 2017, Kansas received over $500,000 to implement programs and changes to help stop the opioid epidemic. A majority of the money went to drug courts to help prevent crimes and intervene with addicts early on.

=== Kentucky ===
Kentucky has been one of the most hard-hit states in the fentanyl crisis. In 2021, fentanyl accounted for 70% of the 2,250 overdose deaths in Kentucky. The state passed 2,000 overdoes deaths again in 2022, reaching that figure in August, with 73% of the deaths involving fentanyl.

The 2020 COVID-19 pandemic contributed to a significant increase in drug overdose in Kentucky, as the state's second largest county, Fayette, witnessed overdose increases of over 40% in the first few months of the year. The county does have an anti-overdose program which, over five years, has distributed over 8,000 naloxone doses. Additionally, the state monitors drug overdose through its Kentucky Overdose Data to Action (KyOD2A) program run by the Department for Public Health, collecting raw data and linking those in need of treatment with available centers as well as supporting community interventions as needed. KyOD2A also partners with the state's prescription electronic reporting system to monitor opioid prescriptions.

=== Louisiana ===
In 2017, the Louisiana Department of Health documented an increase in opioid overdoses. Respondents to the state's HIDTA Drug Treatment and Prevention Survey reported high levels of fentanyl use and an 83% increase of inpatient admissions for fentanyl and other opioids. In response to the growing epidemic in Louisiana, the Advisory Council on Heroin and Opioid Prevention and Education, also known as the HOPE Council, was created as an effort to combat opioid use and established a health surveillance and data collection strategy through interagency coordination. In 2019, the Louisiana Comprehensive Opioid Abuse Program Action Plan and the Louisiana's Opioid Response Plan 2019 were released. These types of efforts, however, have been hindered by continued opioid overprescription. In 2018, Louisiana providers wrote 79.4 opioid prescriptions for every 100 persons, compared to the average U.S. rate of 51.4 prescriptions, making Louisiana among the top five of opioid prescribers in the U.S. that year. In New Orleans, NOLA Ready, the City of New Orleans emergency preparedness campaign, sponsors a 1-hour training with the New Orleans Health Department where the general public can learn how to identify an overdose and administer Naloxone. The New Orleans Public Library (NOPL) has also responded by training librarians and the public on opioid prevention and overdose treatment.

Opioid overdose mortality grew by over 90% in some parishes in Louisiana due to the coronavirus pandemic which has affected the capacity of many state residents to remain drug-free. State officials feared this would lead to still more overdose-related deaths and a long-term effect of more addiction-related disease, ushering in more homelessness and family-alienation. On the reverse of that phenomena, state experts fear that those with substance use disorder are more vulnerable to COVID-19 due to damaged lungs and respiratory systems causing a higher rate of infection. Added to that is the fact that those individuals are affected by stay-at-home orders, where they are more likely to succumb the temptation of use and overdose. There are many social services groups, like Capital Area Human Services, providing therapy as well as opioid-reversal drugs; and No Overdose Baton Rouge, which offers clean syringes, the opioid antagonist nasal spray naloxone, and sterile smoking devices, attempting to help.

=== Maine ===
In Maine, new laws were imposed which capped the maximum daily strength of prescribed opioids and limited prescriptions to seven days.

=== Maryland ===
In March 2017, the governor of Maryland declared a state of emergency to combat the rapid increase in overdoses by increasing and speeding up coordination between the state and local jurisdictions. The previous year about 2,000 people in the state had died from opioid overdoses.

=== Massachusetts ===
Boston Medical Center has changed its approach to addiction and overdose treatment, due to the pandemic. It now offers telehealth appointments which officials believe are more effective than tradition in-person treatment, as more people are participating. Additionally patients are able to get doses of methadone and addiction medications like buprenorphine without an in-person visit. The state's Department of Public Health indicated that there was a downturn in total overdose deaths in the first quarter of 2020 but that rates of overdose mortality among Black men and women, as well as Hispanic men's overdose incidents, showed a notable increase. A COVID-19 Rapid Response Fund disbursed grants to nonprofits serving opioid addiction sufferers and the Boston Resiliency Fund awarded $500K to similar groups.

In 2016, the number of deaths within Massachusetts was the highest it had ever been and twice the national average with 29.7 deaths per 100,000. In order to regulate the use of opioids, Governor Charlie Baker signed Bill H.4056 or the STEP Act into law on March 14, 2016. Due to the STEP Act, opioid prescribing rates fell by 29 percent. According to the Boston Indicators, in 2020 the rate of overdoses related to opioid use disorder was 30.2 per 100,000 people. This was about 1.6% lower than the rate in 2016.

The STEP Act's primary focus is on limiting the supply of opioids and providing patients with the opportunity to request less than their total prescribed amount of opioids at the pharmacy. These components of the STEP Act are broken down as follows:

1. Seven day limit on opioid prescription: Opioid prescriptions given to all adults and minors cannot exceed the seven day supply limit. The only individuals that are exempt from this ruling and therefore can receive an opioid prescription that exceeds the seven day limit are those that are suffering from chronic pain.
2. Patients can request partial fill of opioids: When opioids are being prescribed, the prescriber must inform the patient about the risks of taking opioids; and their option to request an amount less than the prescribed amount. If they feel inclined, patients have the option to request a smaller quantity of opioids than the amount that has been prescribed to them. Pharmacists must comply with the patient's request and inform the prescriber about the amount of opioids given.

=== Michigan ===
A similar plan to Massachusetts was created in Michigan, when the state introduced the Michigan Automated Prescription System (MAPS), allowing doctors to check when and what painkillers had already been prescribed to a patient, and thereby help keep addicts from switching doctors to receive drugs.

=== Minnesota ===
On May 22, 2019, Minnesota Governor, Tim Walz, signed the Opiate Epidemic Response Bill, otherwise known as 'Chapter 63', into law. This law aims to raise funding to combat the opioid epidemic, specifically in Minnesota, via the taxation of pharmaceutical companies, prescribers, and medication distributors. The gathered funds will be deposited into the 'opiate epidemic response account' and allocated by the Opioid Epidemic Response Advisory Council, created through the bill's legislation. The council will be in charge of distributing the funds throughout the state to ensure the most significant impact on those communities hit hardest by the opiate epidemic. The state hopes to collect upwards of $20 million in fees annually to contribute to funding programs created by the council.

=== Missouri ===
In December 2019, the National Council on Alcoholism and Drug Abuse (NCADA-STL) reported that St. Louis had a new high of opioid overdose deaths at 1018. When the COVID-19 pandemic occurred three months later, it impacted opioid overdoses incidents significantly, particularly among the Black community in North St. Louis County, North St. Louis City and parts of South City. Combatting the intersecting outbreaks, local Federally Qualified Health Centers (FQHC) have combined to provide simultaneous Narcan, nasal spray naloxone, an opioid antagonist, and increased access to COVID-19 resting.

=== Nevada ===
By May 2020, Nevada experienced a 23% increase in opioid overdose deaths, when compared to 2019. Overdose deaths in the state peaked in 2011 but were on the decline ever since, until 2020. Over half those deaths involved fentanyl. The Nevada Overdose to Action program reported it was difficult to ascribe the increase to the COVID-19 pandemic, but, like health care providers across the country, the group felt that the isolation and stress caused by the pandemic contributed to the increase in mortality.

The Overdose Mapping Application Program, developed by University of Baltimore, has reported an increase in overdose-related mortality, particularly in southern Nevada. The deaths, thought to be connected to individuals ingesting opioids when isolated, can be prevented with the use of the opioid antagonist naloxone as recommended by the Southern Nevada Health District.

=== New Jersey ===
The state suffered 3021 drug-related deaths in 2019 when 3.99 million opioid prescriptions were dispensed, down slightly from 3102 in 2018 when 4.3 million opioid prescriptions were filled. In the first quarter 2020, drug-related deaths were 789. The coronavirus pandemic has overshadowed another, longer term crisis in the state – the opioid epidemic. Detox centers have cut down on accepting patients, people in 12-step programs must meet online, and individuals who successfully complete rehab face more hurdles – unemployment and homelessness. "It's almost like everything has been stopped in time," said John Pellicane, Director of the Office of Mental Health and Addiction Awareness Task Force in Camden County, New Jersey. Phone calls to the state's addiction hotline, ReachNJ, increased from an average 3,500/month to 4,000/month. Morris County overdoses increased by 41% in first quarter 2020. There were 100 more overdose deaths in the same period – statewide. Bergen County suspended all face-to-face substance use disorder counseling and meetings. The state does not approve of virtual meetings or counseling due to confidentiality concerns and trust issues.

In 2020, New Jersey Attorney General Gurbir Grewal announced that, during the COVID-19 pandemic, all medical personnel were required to prescribe the opioid antagonist naloxone to individuals ingesting higher doses of opioids or those combining opioids with benzodiazepines, such as Xanax, an anti-anxiety medication. This regulation, already in the process of being recommended by various state entities, was adopted quickly in response to the coronavirus pandemic and a concomitant increase in overdose mortality. First responders also reported an increase in dispensing naloxone to those suffering from overdoses. It was thought that providing naloxone to individuals whose prescriptions were the equivalent or 90 morphine milligrams would free medical emergency workers and police from responding to overdose exigencies. By May 2020, Gov. Phil Murphy's administration reported that mortality from opioid overdoses had increased 20%. To counter the trend, the state sent 11,000 doses of the nasal spray naloxone. The first shipment went to 178 emergency medical service teams across the state. For more information, see response to the opioid crisis in New Jersey.

=== New York ===
The New York State Department of Health reported that the Office of National Drug Control Policy wanted to use New York's police training policy on opioids as a model for other states. Additionally, in 2019 NYSDOH began the NY State Opioid Data Dashboard, which provides datapoints to educate local opioid-prevention officials and policy makers on the epidemic. The dashboard includes quarterly updates on opioid overdose information like mortality, ED visits and hospitalization by county throughout the state. NYSDOH also developed I-Stop, a requirement for all prescription-providing health care professionals to report and track their prescriptions for controlled substance drugs, thereby stemming patients from seeing many doctors for prescriptions. The combination of the COVID-19 pandemic and the opioid crisis causes unique problems for recovering addicts who rely on community support in a time of social distancing. A Binghamton NY addiction resource center, Truth Pharm, has revamped its naloxone training to a virtual model. Additionally, even virtual naloxone training can be more than simply administering a life-saving drug as it provides those struggling with addiction a human contact and the ability to discuss specific needs and issues.

In 2020, there was a 25.8% increase in opioid overdose cases and a 38% increase in overdose deaths in the Rochester area (Monroe County). Concern over the overdose growth has led to legislators introducing legislation in the state Assembly that would require pharmacies to offer a dose of naloxone to individuals receiving an opioid prescription. Naloxone is presently available in New York state without a prescription. The new legislation provides funding for the payment of co-pays or free naloxone if the individual has no insurance.

Further efforts to combat the opioid epidemic focus on the criminal justice system. Opioid Intervention Courts such as the Buffalo Drug Treatment Court (BDTC) seek to connect offenders who are drug-addicted to resources. Participants are given the opportunity to receive comprehensive medical rehabilitation. Established in 2017, this court program has resulted in the successful recovery of many participants, a key step in preventing recidivism and combating the opioid epidemic.

=== Ohio ===
At 24.6 deaths per 1,000 people, Ohio has the 5th highest rate of drug overdose deaths in the United States. The Governor's Cabinet Opiate Action Team (GCOAT) was created in 2011 by Governor John Kasich and is "one of the nation's most aggressive and comprehensive approaches to address opioid use disorder and overdose deaths, including a strong focus on preventing the nonmedical use of prescription drugs". GCOAT utilizes partnerships with various state agencies including the Ohio Board of Pharmacy. The strategy suggests regulations that are encompassed under three main categories: (1) to promote the responsible use of opioids, (2) to reduce the supply of opioids, and (3) to support overdose prevention and expand access to naloxone. The legislation reduced the number of opioid doses by over 80 million between 2011 and 2015. Also, unintentional drug related overdose deaths involving prescription opioids have decreased from 45% in 2011 to 22% in 2015. However, Ohio has not seen a decrease in fentanyl distribution. The coronavirus pandemic of 2020 reduced treatments for those suffering from substance use disorders in many Ohio counties, leading to increases in drug overdoses. For example, Highland County experienced double the amount of drug overdose calls to the sheriff's department from May 2019 to May 2020. The number of overdoses in Franklin County increased by 50% in the first four months of 2020.

=== Pennsylvania ===
The city of Philadelphia suffers from the highest rate (among all US big cities) of drug overdose in the country, averaging three mortalities per day in 2019, a situation intensified by the 2020 coronavirus pandemic. Prevention Point Philadelphia, the US's largest syringe-exchange organization, doubled the amount of the nasal spray naloxone it distributed in the first month of the city's stay-at-home order. The city's overdose mortality rated remained the same as it was before the pandemic, providing an indication that more naloxone was being administered to overdose victims. Several Philadelphia-based public health and criminal justice support groups were providing cell phones to homeless people and inmates recently released from prison so they can experience telehealth healthcare provider visits and renew prescriptions for opioid antagonist medication. The Pennsylvania Harm Reduction Coalition (PAHRC) initiated a new postal service-based naloxone distribution program that delivers the drug directly to the home. The group also included PPE gloves and face shields with the naloxone kits in an attempt to limit coronavirus dispersal.

Beaver County PA, after experiencing a decline in opioid overdose deaths from 2017, saw a 30% increase in those deaths since the pandemic began, according to UPMC Western Psychiatric Hospital addiction medicine services. The county also suffered from an increase in domestic violence, child abuse, and worsening drug and alcohol use disorder, all attributed to the isolation caused by the pandemic.

=== South Carolina ===
The state suffered 1,103 overdose fatalities in 2018. In 2020, state substance use disorder remedial facilities were concerned about the impact of COVID-19. They emphasized the importance of group meetings; several have moved the meetings outside. The Phoenix Center, in Greenville, limited large meetings and restricted visitor access to its in-patients. Other providers have turned to on-line meetings, but participation is down. The South Carolina Department of Alcohol and Other Drug Abuse Services (SC DAODAS), concerned about the effects of the coronavirus pandemic on state residents suffering from substance use disorder, fears a setback in its battle with the opioid epidemic. The apprehension that self-quarantining and the isolation it brings can cause loneliness, anxiety, boredom, clinical depression or PTSD can lead to enhanced overdose risk. In April 2020, the department provided over 7,000 boxes of Naloxone, the nasal spray overdose reversal drug while encouraging afflicted South Carolinians to take advantage of the DAODAS' system of state-licensed and nationally accredited service providers. The department also encouraged individuals to reach out to friends and family during this crisis.

=== Tennessee ===
Carter County, Tennessee, population 56K, has experienced nearly 60 opioid overdose deaths since 2014, a year in which 8.1 million opioid prescriptions were written in the entire state, population 6.5 million. To stem that consequence of addiction, the county's drug prevention alliance embarked on a controversial policy – providing naloxone distribution training to around 600 children and teenagers. Some of the children have taught what they learned to their peers and distributed naloxone at community events where one child handed out 70 doses of the drug. The region is a conservative one where residents, law enforcement and school boards have objected, considering naloxone a "waste of resources" and the training not child-appropriate.

A spike in overdoses and overdose deaths due to the COVID-19 pandemic led Memphis-area Baptist Hospitals and Integrated Addiction Care (IAC), an outpatient rehab group, to set up a 24/7 hotline for individuals struggling with addiction. The Shelby County Health Department stated that people with substance use disorder issues should have access to both the care they need and to naloxone, the nasal spray opioid antagonist. The free hotline is staffed by physician professionals who can provide medical advice or direct callers to an emergency department.

=== Texas ===
Studies have found that after the implementation of "pill mill laws" in Texas, opioid dose, volume, prescriptions and pills dispensed within the state were all significantly reduced.

=== Vermont ===
The number of opioid overdoses in Burlington, Vermont increased by 76% in 2020; the number of nonfatal overdose emergency room visits went up 100% in the same period, according to Burlington's police department. But the number of overdose fatalities went down for the first time since 2014. The overdose increases are due to an influx of fentanyl, a synthetic opioid, as well as the pressures of the COVID-19 pandemic; the mortality decreases are the result of safety measures, such as the community distribution of naloxone.

=== Wisconsin ===
The state of Wisconsin established the HOPE (Heroin, Opiate Prevention and Education) agenda to face the Opioid Epidemic. The Enactment of Act 262 took place on April 9, 2018. The act focuses on bettering substance use disorder counseling, which is critical in the opioid withdrawal process.

=== Utah ===
In 2017, Rep. Edward Redd and Sen. Todd Weiler proposed amendments to Utah's involuntary commitment statutes which would allow relatives to petition a court to mandate substance-abuse treatment for adults.

=== Washington ===
In February 2017, officials in Everett, Washington, filed a lawsuit against Purdue Pharma, the manufacturer of OxyContin, for negligence by first, allowing and also failing to prevent drugs being illegally trafficked to city residents. The city wants the company to pay the costs of handling the crisis. In May 2022, Attorney General of Washington State, Bob Ferguson, announced opioid distributors McKesson Corporation, Cardinal Health, and AmerisourceBergen would pay $518 million to the state for damages from the opioid epidemic.

=== West Virginia ===
In West Virginia, leading the nation in overdose deaths per capita, lawsuits sought to declare drug distribution companies a "public nuisance" in an effort to place accountability upon the drug industry for the costs associated with the epidemic. On May 3, 2021, the city of Huntington filed a lawsuit against three major drug manufacturers accusing them of their role in stoking the opioid crisis through their excessive shipment of painkillers.

== See also ==
- Anti-fentanyl legislation in the United States
- China and the opioid epidemic in the United States
