= Quality Control Orders in India =

Technical barriers to trade imposed by India

Quality Control Orders (QCOs) are statutory orders issued by the Government of India under the Bureau of Indian Standards Act, 2016, that make conformity to a specified Indian Standard compulsory for a product, so that it may not be manufactured, imported, stored, or sold without certification from the Bureau of Indian Standards (BIS). The Act permits such orders on grounds of public interest, protection of human, animal, or plant health, environmental safety, prevention of unfair trade practises, or national security. Fewer than 90 such orders were in force in 2019; the number grew several-fold from 2020 as the government used them to curb sub-standard imports and support domestic manufacturing before a partial rollback covering industrial raw materials began in November 2025. The government has defended the orders as raising product quality and giving Indian manufacturers access to export markets, while economists, trading partners, and small firms have criticized them as non-tariff barriers that raise input costs.

== Legal framework ==
Indian Standards formulated by BIS are voluntary unless the central government makes them mandatory by issuing a QCO under the BIS Act 2016 (which replaced the Bureau of Indian Standards Act, 1986). Section 16 of the 2016 Act empowers the central government to direct the compulsory use of the Standard Mark on notified goods, and Section 17 prohibits any person from manufacturing, importing, distributing, selling, hiring, leasing, storing, or exhibiting for sale such goods without the mark. Section 29 punishes contraventions with imprisonment of up to two years or a fine of not less than ₹2 lakh (US$2,100) for a first offence and ₹5 lakh (US$5,200) for subsequent offences, extendable to 10 times the value of the goods involved in the contravention.

=== Certification ===
Certification is administered under the Bureau of Indian Standards (Conformity Assessment) Regulations, 2018. Scheme I, the most stringent, requires a factory audit and licencing of premises before the ISI Mark may be used; Scheme II is a registration-based scheme relying on self-declaration and product testing; a separate Foreign Manufacturer Certification Scheme applies to overseas producers.

For foreign applicants, the costs cited include application and certification fees of ₹20,000 (US$210) to ₹30,000 (US$310), a performance bank guarantee of US$10,000 per product, testing charges and the expenses of BIS inspectors travelling to the factory, with inspections typically taking seven to eight months and sometimes over a year.

As QCOs are technical regulations, India notifies draft orders to the World Trade Organization under the Agreement on Technical Barriers to Trade, where other members may raise concerns.

== Scope and sectors ==
Unlike the mandatory standards in the United States, the European Union, or Japan, which largely apply to finished products, Indian QCOs have been applied extensively to raw materials and intermediate goods. The Centre for Social and Economic Progress, a New Delhi-based think tank, estimates that 45.7% of orders cover intermediate goods. ThePrint has reported that ~70% apply to raw materials, intermediates, or capital goods rather than consumer products; the sectors most affected are metals, machinery and electronics, textiles, chemicals, plastics and rubber, and footwear.

== International trade concerns ==
By late 2023, concerns about Indian measures accounted for roughly 13% of all specific trade concerns raised in the WTO TBT Committee since May 2020, more than a third of them relating to QCOs; the United States, Canada, the European Union, Japan, the United Kingdom, and Taiwan have raised objections to orders on toys, chemicals, ICT products, automobile parts, furniture, and other goods. The United States Trade Representative's 2025 National Trade Estimate Reports said that since 2019, India has made many BIS standards mandatory in chemicals, medical devices, batteries, electronics, food and textiles, and has characterised some requirements as "not internationally aligned" and "burdensome". A Japan External Trade Organization survey for fiscal 2025 found that 71.9% of Japanese manufacturers in India said BIS certification had affected or was expected to affect their operations.

== Assessment ==
=== Government position ===
The government has presented QCOs as part of a "Zero Defect, Zero Effect" quality agenda intended to move India from separate domestic and export standards to a single standard, to curb cheap and sub -standard imports, and to build testing infrastructure, with BIS fully funding new laboratories and a target of halving testing fees.

In May 2025, Union Minister of Commerce and Industry, Piyush Goyal, said that every quality control order introduced so far has earned the support of the concerned sector because it has not only improved product quality but also helped Indian manufacturers access larger markets. Consumer Affairs Minister Jitin Prasada described the approach as "consultative and collaborative". Responding to WTO concerns, India has pointed out that the European Union, Japan, and the United Kingdom also maintain stringent mandatory standards.

=== Economic effects and criticism ===
An econometric study by the Centre for Social and Economic Progress found that imports of covered product fell by ~13% in the year of notification of a QCO, and 24% in the long-run; with imports of intermediate goods falling 16% in the first year, and 30% in the long-run while exports rise 10.6% in the notification year, fall 12.8% the next year and show no lon-run gain; the paper concludes that QCOs "suppress imports—especially of intermediate inputs critical to domestic production—without improving export performance."

The same study reports certification costs of ₹10,000 (US$100) - ₹15,000 (US$160) per consignment for small firms and observes that "larger firms are better able to absorb compliance costs, sometimes benefiting from the exclusion of smaller competitors". Stakeholders told the authors that orders were "increasingly being used to address price differences between Indian and foreign products, rather than being strictly applied for legitimate quality concerns."

A NITI Aayog report in October 2025 stated that QCOs posed "challenges particularly for MSMEs and export-oriented sectors dependent on imported inputs", and described India's regime as "protectionist in comparison to other major economies, which rely on prevailing market standards for quality". India's man-made-fibre exports to the EU fell by 9%, and exports to the US stagnated in 2023-24 while Vietnam's rose 4-6%. The Global Trade Research Initiative, a think tank, has argued that mandatory certification raises manufacturing costs, disadvantages small businesses, and makes consumer goods dearer. It has also warned that abrupt withdrawal of QCOs, alongside lapsed anti-dumping duties, leaves domestic producers exposed to a "protection vacuum".

== See also ==
- Bureau of Indian Standards
- ISI Mark
- Certification mark
- Technical barriers to trade
- Agreement on Technical Barriers to Trade
