= Agmark =

Indian agricultural certification mark

Agmark ( Agriculture marketing )
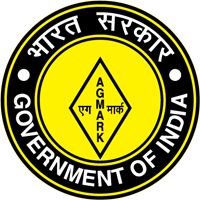
- Certifying agency: Directorate of Marketing and Inspection, Government of India
- Effective region: India
- Effective since: 1937, 1986 (amended)
- Product category: Agricultural products
- Legal status: Advisory

AGMARK is a certification mark employed on agricultural products in India, assuring that they conform to a set of standards approved by the Directorate of Marketing and Inspection an attached Office of the Department of Agriculture, Cooperation and Farmers Welfare under Ministry of Agricultural & Farmers Welfare an agency of the Government of India. The AGMARK Head Office at Faridabad (Haryana) is legally enforced in India by the Agricultural Produce (Grading and Marking) Act of 1937 (and amended in 1986). The present AGMARK standards cover quality guidelines for 224 different commodities spanning a variety of pulses, cereals, essential oils, vegetable oils, Fruits and Vegetables and semi-processed products like vermicelli.

== Etymology (origin) ==
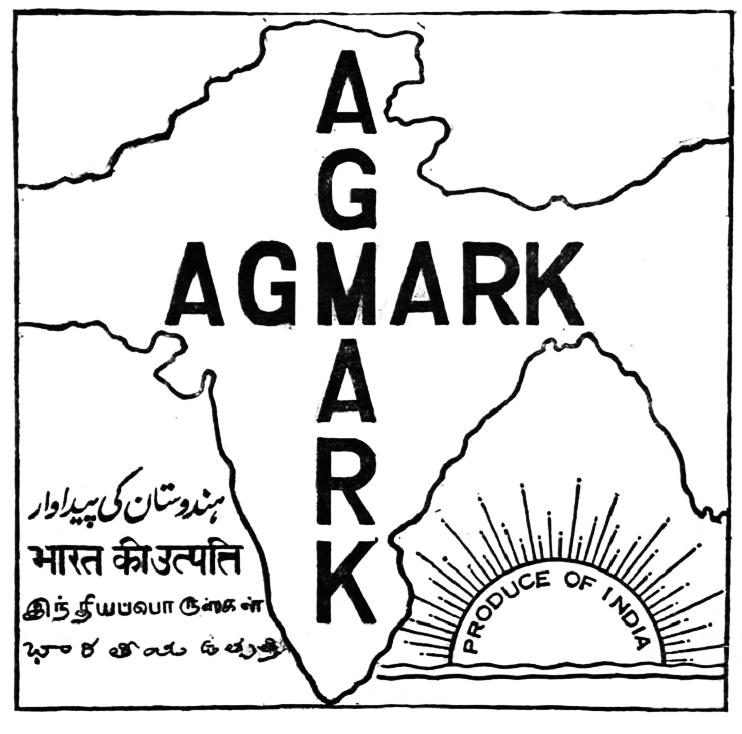
The logo in 1941

The term agmark was coined by joining the words 'Ag' to mean agriculture and 'mark' for a certification mark. This term was introduced originally in the bill presented in the parliament of India for the Agricultural Produce (Grading and Marking) Act.

The entire system of Agmark, including the name, was created by Archibald MacDonald Livingstone, Agricultural and Marketing Advisory to the Government of India, from 1934 to 1941. He was supported by a staff of several hundred. The system was designed to benefit local growers throughout India who were, in the absence of a certification as to quality, exposed to receiving less for their produce from dealers than its true worth.

== Agmark Laboratories ==
The Agmark certification is employed through fully state-owned Agmark laboratories located across the nation which act as testing and certifying centres. In addition to the Central AGMARK Laboratory (CAL) in Nagpur, there are Regional AGMARK Laboratories (RALs) in 11 nodal cities (Mumbai, New Delhi, Chennai, Kolkata, Kanpur, Kochi, Guntur, Amritsar, Jaipur, Rajkot, Bhopal). Each of the regional laboratories is equipped with and specializes in the testing of products of regional significance. Hence the product range that could be tested varies across the centres.

== Commodities and tests ==
The testing done across these laboratories include chemical analysis, microbiological analysis, pesticide residue, and aflatoxin analysis on whole spices, ground spices, ghee, butter, vegetable oils, mustard oil, honey, food grains (wheat), wheat products (atta, suji, and maida), gram flour, soybean seed, jowar, bajra, bengal gram, ginger, oil cake, NON edible oil, oils and fats, animal casings, meat and other food products.

== See also ==
- Certification marks in India
- BIS hallmark
- FPO mark
- ISI mark
- Food grading
