= Kasti Coriander =

Type of coriander variety from Maharashtra, India

Kasti Coriander (कास्ती कोथिंबीर)
- Geographical indication
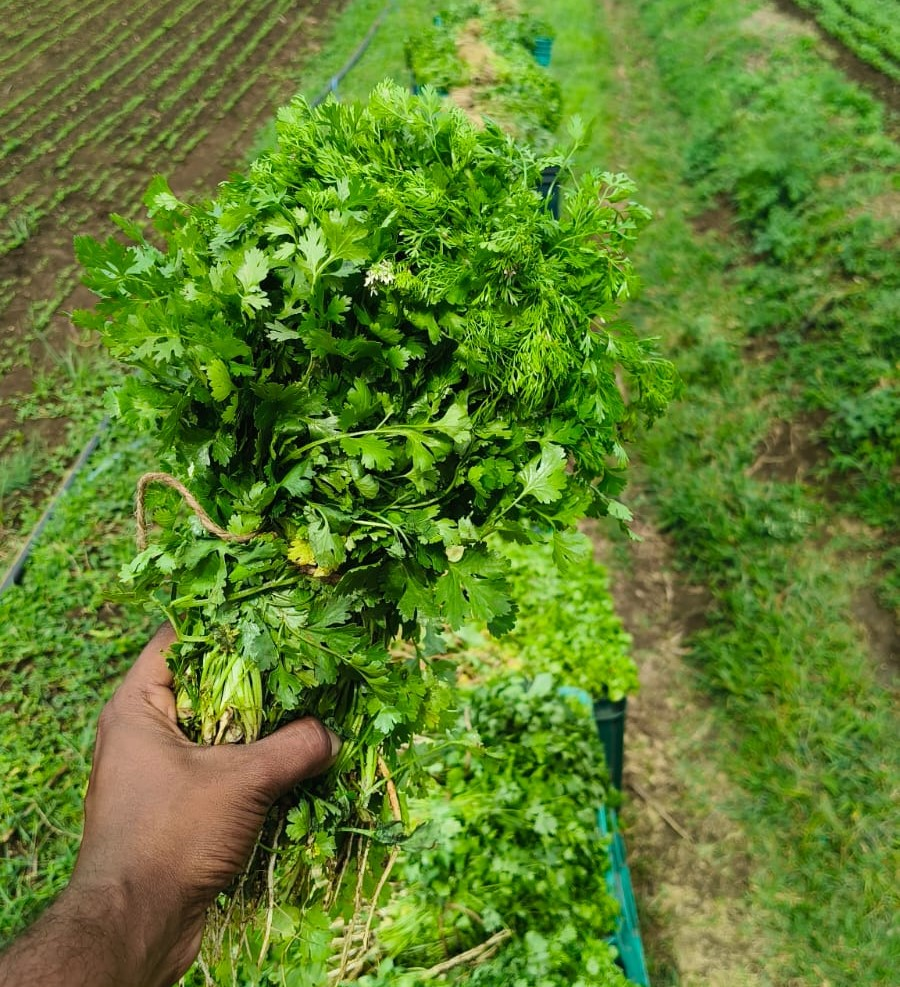
- Kasti Coriander closeup
- Description: Kasti Coriander is a coriander variety cultivated in Maharashtra
- Type: Coriander
- Area: Latur district
- Country: India
- Registered: 30 March 2024
- Official website: ipindia.gov.in

Kasti Coriander is a variety of coriander cultivated in the Indian state of Maharashtra. It is a common and widely cultivated crop in the Ashiv village located in Ausa taluka of Latur district.

Under its Geographical Indication tag, it is referred to as "Kasti Coriander".

== Name ==
Kasti Coriander is known as Kasti Kothimbir in the local state language of Marathi.

== Description ==
Ashiv village and its surrounding areas in Ausa taluka are known for cultivating quality coriander. Spanning 150-175 acres annually, this crop is highly sought after for its distinctive fragrance and taste, making it a prized commodity in the market.

== Photo Gallery ==
Actual photos from a Kasti Coriander farmer from Sugaon village located in Chakur taluka (Latur district).

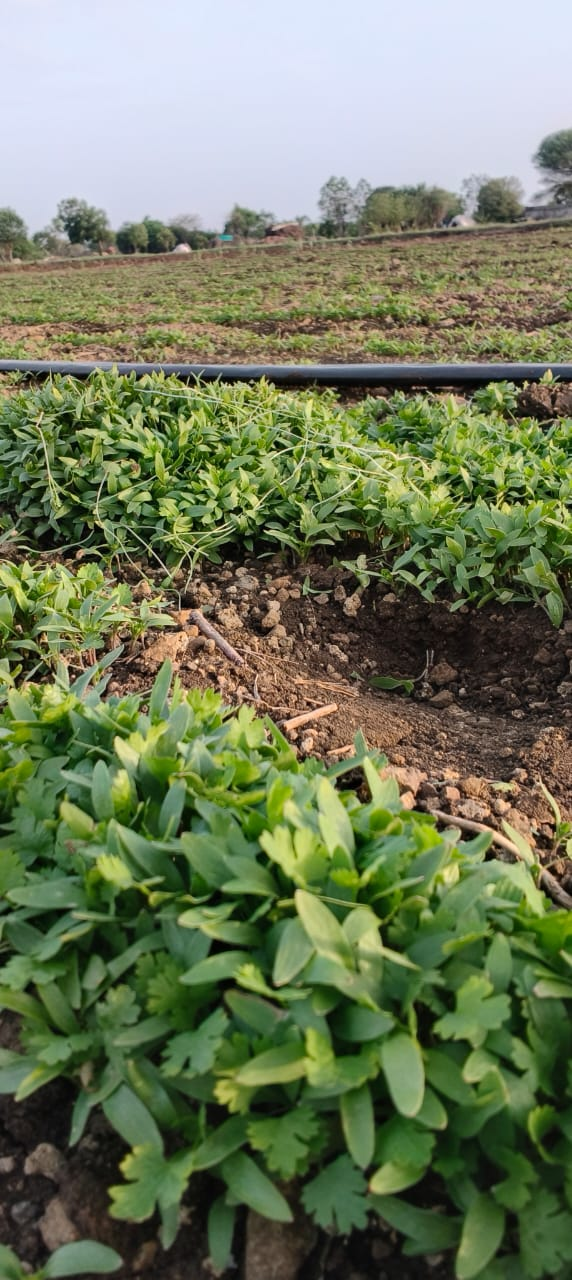
Closeup of Kasti Coriander at a farm at Sugaon village located in Chakur taluka

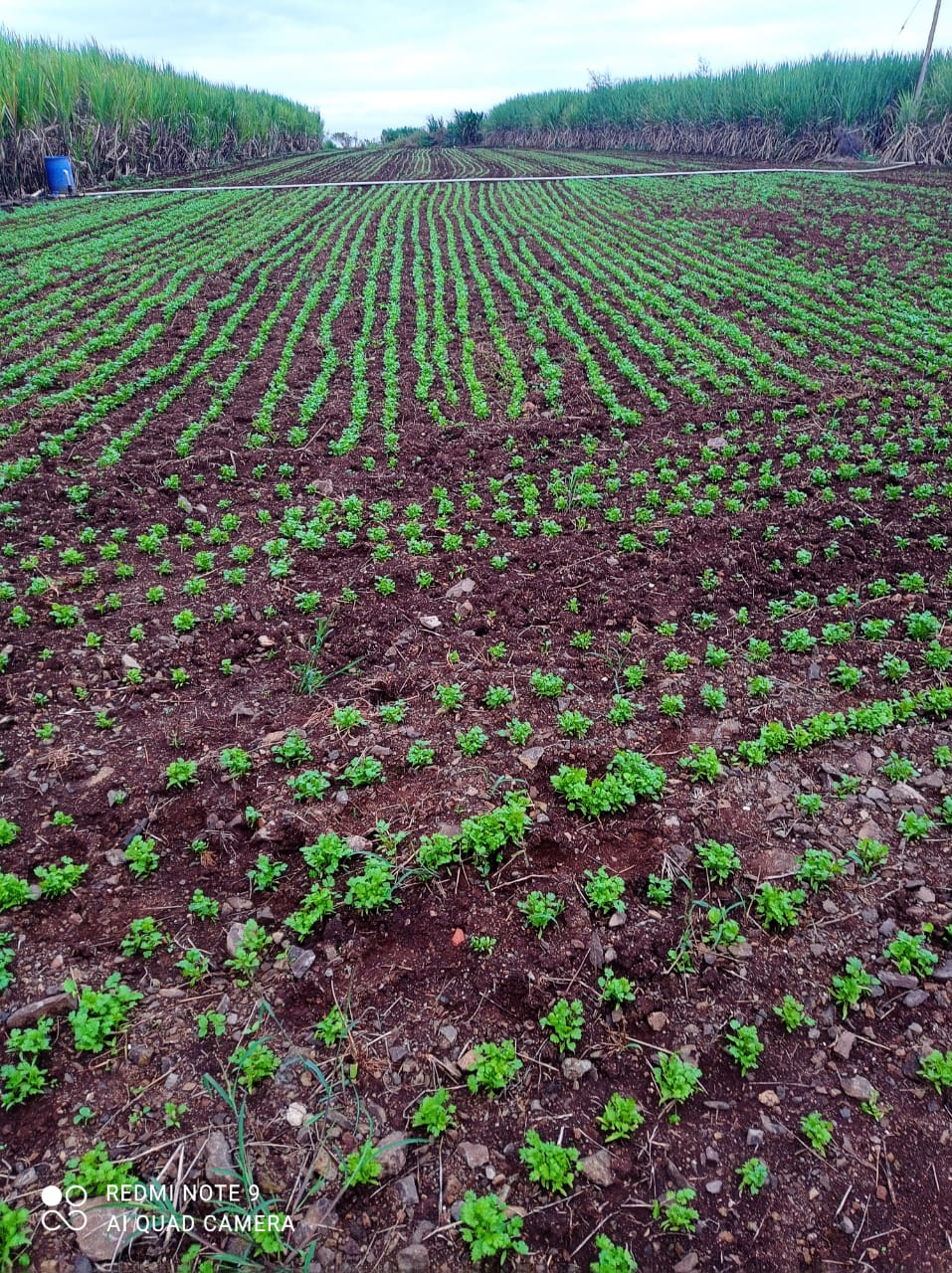
Long shot of Kasti Coriander farm

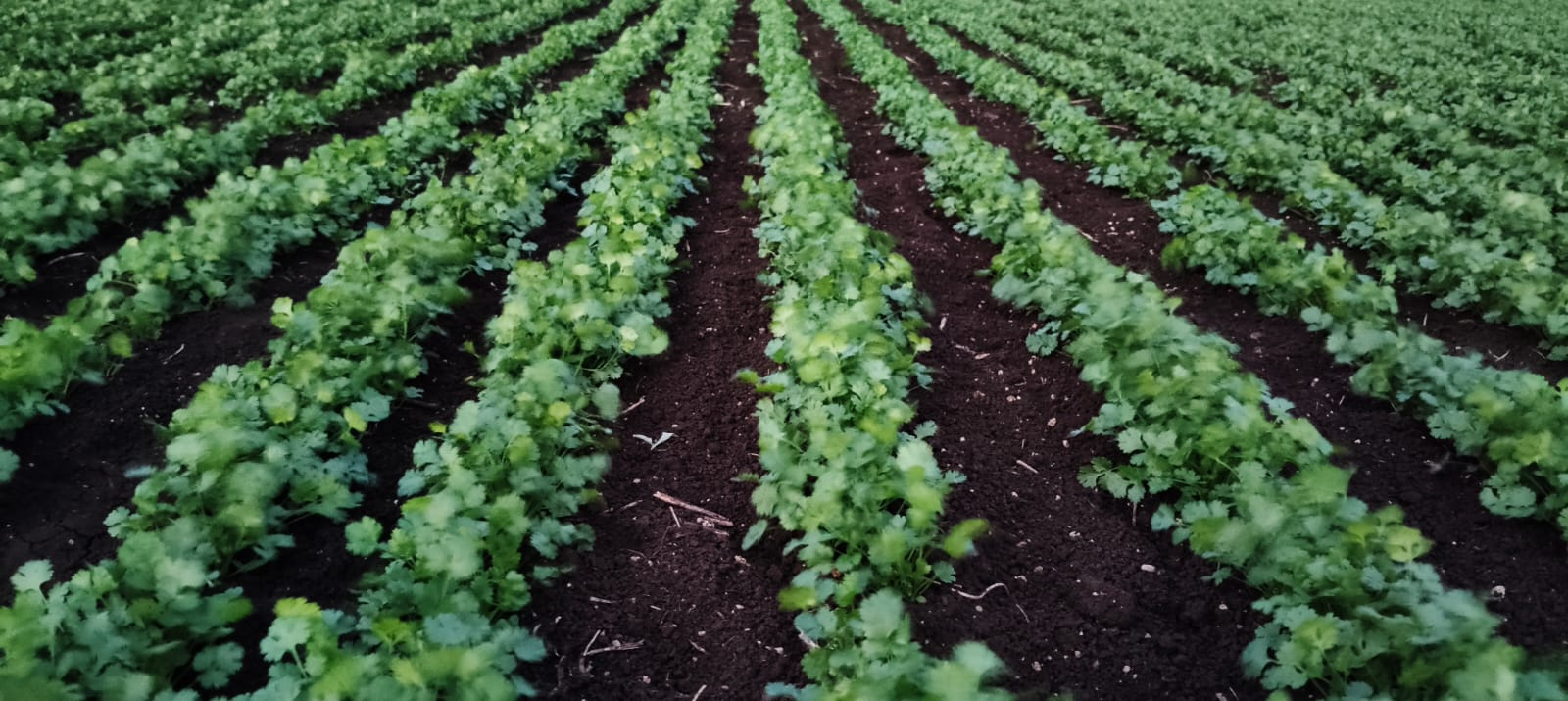
Another picture of Kasti Coriander farm

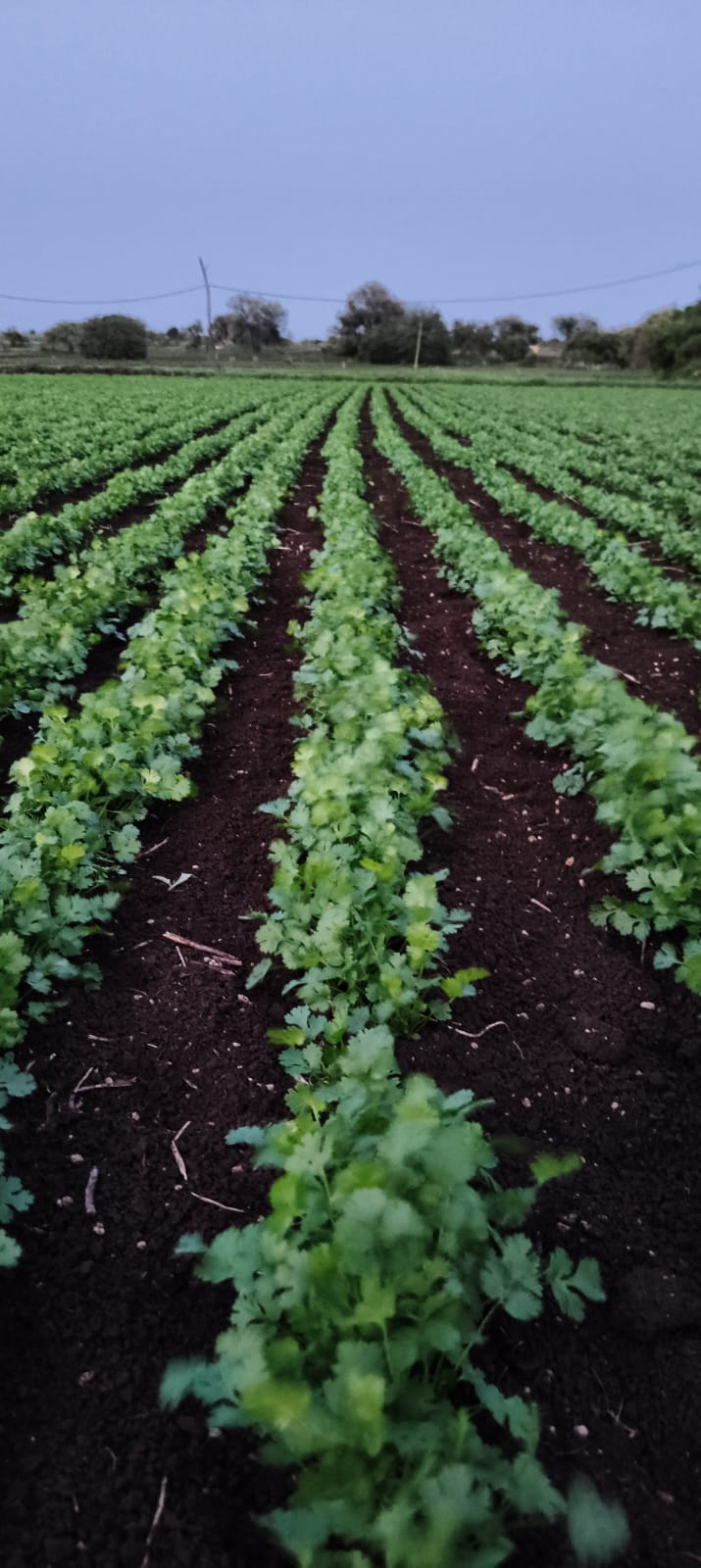
Another Closeup of Kasti Coriander farm

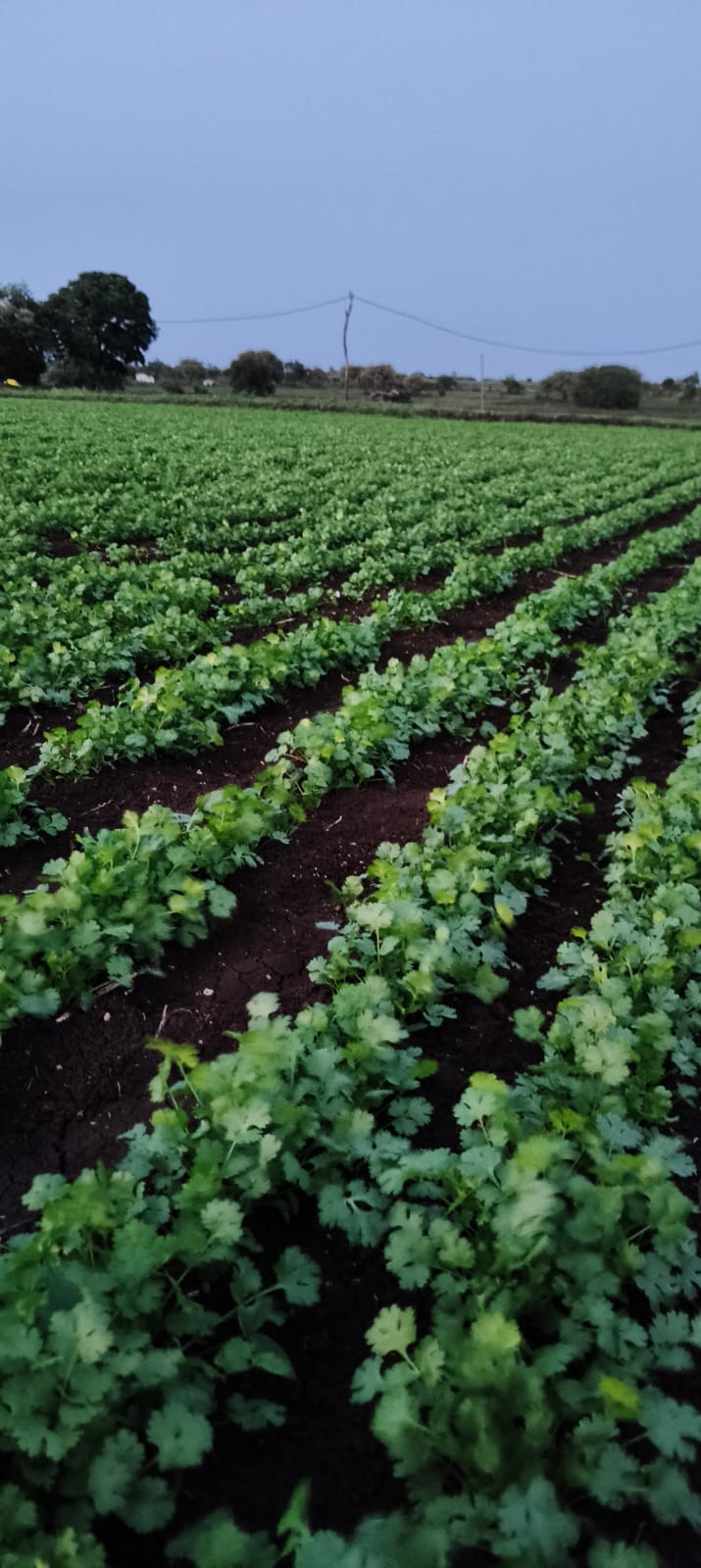
One more Closeup of Kasti Coriander farm

== Geographical indication ==
It was awarded the Geographical Indication (GI) status tag from the Geographical Indications Registry, under the Union Government of India, on 30 March 2024 and is valid until 6 February 2032.

Kasti Kothimbir Shetkari Utpadak Sangh from Ausa, proposed the GI registration of Kasti Coriander. After filing the application in February 2022, the Kasti Coriander was granted the GI tag in 2024 by the Geographical Indication Registry in Chennai, making the name "Kasti Coriander" exclusive to the region. It thus became the 46th type of goods from Maharashtra to earn the GI tag.
