= Ashiv =

Village in Latur, Maharashtra

- Village
- Location in Maharashtra, India Ashiv (India)
- Coordinates: 18.09°N 76.35°E
- Country: India
- State: Maharashtra
- District: Latur district
- Taluka: Ausa

Languages
  - Official: Marathi
- Time zone: UTC+5:30 (IST)
- PIN: 413520

Ashiv is a village in the Ausa taluka of Latur district located in Maharashtra State, India.

== Farming ==
Ashiv village and its surrounding areas in Ausa taluka are known for cultivating quality coriander. Spanning 150-175 acres annually, this crop is highly sought after for its distinctive fragrance and taste, making it a prized commodity in the market.

== Geographical indication ==
Kasti Coriander was awarded the Geographical Indication (GI) status tag from the Geographical Indications Registry, under the Union Government of India, on 30 March 2024 and is valid until 6 February 2032.

Kasti Kotimbir Shetkari Utpadak Sangh from Ausa, proposed the GI registration of Kasti Coriander. After filing the application in February 2022, the Kasti Coriander was granted the GI tag in 2024 by the Geographical Indication Registry in Chennai, making the name "Kasti Coriander" exclusive to the region. It thus became the 46th type of goods from Maharashtra to earn the GI tag.
