= UIC =

UIC may refer to:

== Computing ==
- Uranium Information Centre, a defunct website sponsored by uranium mining companies
- User identification code, the user number of the Files-11 file system in the RSX-11 operating system

== Education ==
- University of Illinois Chicago, a public four-year university in Chicago, Illinois, United States
  - UIC Flames, the intercollegiate athletic program of the University of Illinois Chicago
- Underwood International College, an affiliated department of Yonsei University, Seoul, South Korea
- United International College, a public liberal arts college in Zhuhai, Guangdong, China
- University of the Immaculate Conception, a private Catholic institution in Davao City, Philippines

== Government ==
- Uganda Insurance Commission, a government agency
- Unit Identification Code, an alphanumeric code used by the United States Department of Defense
- Underground Injection Control Program, a U.S. environmental regulatory program

== Organisations ==
- International Union of Railways (Union Internationale des Chemins de fer), an international rail transport industry body
- UEFA Intertoto Cup, an association football tournament for member clubs of UEFA
- Union of Islamic Courts, an armed group in Somalia, now called the "Supreme Islamic Courts Council"
- United Industrial Corporation Ltd, a Singapore real estate holding company owned by JG Summit Holdings
- Uttarakhand Information Commission, a state government organisation of Uttarakhand, India

== See also ==
- OIC (disambiguation)
