= OIC (disambiguation) =

== Government ==
- Offer in compromise, an agreement to reduce debt to the United States Internal Revenue Service
- Office of the Independent Counsel, an office of the U.S. Department of Justice
- Office of Intelligence and Counterintelligence, an office of the United States Department of Energy
- Officer in charge (Philippines), the specific status of a temporary head of a local government or agency in the Philippines
- Officer in Command, primarily used in the United States Uniformed Services as well as police and sheriff's departments
- Opioid intervention court
- Organisation of Islamic Cooperation, an international organisation of Muslim nations
- Orkney Islands Council, the local government authority for Orkney, Scotland, United Kingdom

== Medicine ==
- Opioid-induced constipation
- Octahydroindole-2-carboxylic Acid (Oic), an intermediary in the synthesis of Perindopril

== Music ==
- Outline in Color, a rock band from Tulsa, Oklahoma, United States

== Organisations ==
- Open Interconnect Consortium
- Opportunities Industrialization Center, a nonprofit adult education and job training organisation headquartered in Philadelphia, Pennsylvania, United States.
- Order of the Imitation of Christ, a monastic order in the Syro-Malankara Catholic Church

== Sports ==
- Two incarnations of the Oklahoma Intercollegiate Conference: Oklahoma Intercollegiate Conference (1914–1928), Oklahoma Intercollegiate Conference (1974–1997)

== Transportation ==
- OIC, the IATA code for Lt. Warren Eaton Airport in Norwich, New York, United States

== See also ==
- UIC (disambiguation)
