= Ecomark =

Certification mark

- The Ecomark logo.
- Certifying agency: Bureau of Indian Standards
- Effective region: India
- Effective since: 1991
- Product category: 17
- Type of standard: Quality Mark
- Legal status: Advisory

Ecomark or Eco mark is a certification mark issued by the Bureau of Indian Standards (the national standards organization of India) to products conforming to a set of standards aimed at the least impact on the ecosystem. The marking scheme was started in 1991. One of the purposes of the mark is increasing awareness among the consumers towards reducing environment impact. The mark is issued to various product categories and the development of standards for more products is in progress. The Ministry of Environment, Forest and Climate Change (MoEF&CC) is implementing an eco-labeling Scheme for environment-friendly products. The Ecomark Scheme has launched in 1991 vide G.S.R. 85(E) ^{[7]} dated 21.02.1991. Under this Scheme, The Government of India has notified the final criteria for the 17 product categories^{[8]} like Soaps and Detergents, Pier, Food Items, lubricating oils^{[9]}, Packaging materials/Package, Architectural Paints and Powder Coatings, Batteries, Electrical and electronic goods, Food Additives, Wood Substitutes, Cosmetics, Aerosols and Propellants, Plastic Products, Textiles, Fire-extinguishers, Leather, and Coir & Coir Products.

The rules were updated in 2024 under 'LiFE' (Lifestyle for Environment) Mission. It replaces the Ecomark scheme of 1991. In this version Central Pollution Control Board is nominated as implementer along with Bureau of Indian Standards. At the World Circular Economy Forum 2026 (WCEF 2026) on 16th September 2026, in Gandhinagar, the new Ecomark logo (replacing the earthen pot) was revealed. (Ref - https://www.pib.gov.in/PressReleaseDetail.aspx?PRID=2311052&reg=48&lang=2)
