= Silk Mark =

Indian silk certification mark

- The Silk Mark logo.
- Certifying agency: Silk Mark Organisation of India
- Effective since: 2004
- Product category: Silk textile
- Legal status: Advisory
- Website: silkmarkindia.com

Silk Mark is a certification mark in India for silk textiles. The mark certifies that the piece of textile which bears the mark is made of pure natural silk. The certification is managed by the 'Silk Mark Organisation of India', a society set up by the state-controlled Central Silk Board of India. Even though promoted by the government of India, the mark is only advisory in nature and is not legally endorsed. The certification scheme was founded by the Central Silk Board in 2004. In the original format, the mark included a silk mark logo woven on a hang-on tag on which a unique numbered hologram would be affixed. But the hang-on tag tended to be faked (reused) hence, a new method with the mark woven onto the textile itself has been proposed.

The certification process assures the consumer a facility for free testing of the marked product in Silk Mark Chapters (accredited labs) in case of doubt.

== See also ==
- Certification marks in India
- Geographical Indications marks
