= BIS hallmark =

Hallmarking system in India

- The BIS corporate logo which is a component of the hallmark format
- Standards organization: Bureau of Indian Standards
- Certifying agency: Accredited 'Assaying & Hallmarking Centres'
- Effective region: India
- Effective since: 2000 for Gold jewelry, 2005 for Silver jewelry
- Product category: Gold jewelry, Silver jewelry
- Website: bis.org.in

The BIS Hallmark is a hallmarking system for gold as well as silver jewellery sold in India, certifying the purity of the metal. It certifies that the piece of jewellery conforms to a set of standards laid by the Bureau of Indian Standards, the national standards organization of India. India is the second biggest market for gold and its jewellery.

India imports in excess of 1000 tons annually (including unofficially smuggled gold) with negligible local production. The annual gold imports are around 50 billion US$ next only to crude oil imports widening the trade deficit.

== Gold ==
The BIS system of hallmarking of gold jewellery began in April 2000. The standard specifications governing this system are IS 1417 (grades of gold and gold alloys, jewellery/artefacts), IS 1418 (assaying of gold in gold bullion, gold alloys and gold jewellery/artefacts), IS 2790 (guidelines for manufacture of 14, 18 and 22 carat gold alloys only ), IS 3095 (gold solders for use in manufacture of jewellery).

=== The BIS hallmark ===
BIS hallmark for gold jewelry consists of several components:

- The BIS hallmark logo
- Purity of Gold either one of this 22K916 Corresponding to 22 Carat, 18K750 Corresponding to 18 Carat and 14K585 Corresponding to 14 Carat.
- 6 digit alphanumeric HUID- HALLMARK UNIQUE IDENTIFICATION

=== Total physical national gold stock ===
- Total gold holding of India:

Total above-ground physical gold holding in India, which includes both government's official central bank reserves and private ownership (such as households, jewelry, religious institutions such as the Padmanabhaswamy Temple treasure and Golden temple, private corporations, etc), was estimated to be between 25,000 and 35,000 tonnes, valued at approximately US$3.8 trillion to US$5 trillion, representing over 10% of the world's total above-ground gold and making it the largest private gold stock globally, far exceeding the domestic mining output which is largely concentrated in Kolar Gold Fields in Karnataka.

- Top 10 nations with above-ground physical gold holdings, including private gold holding, are
  - India (~34,600+ tonnes, driven by heavy private household ownership of jewelry and traditional gold)
  - China (~2,191+ tonnes, plus significant private ownership, though exact household numbers are lower than India)
  - United States (~8,133 tonnes with largest central bank reserve and significant private holding)
  - Germany (~ 12,450 tonnes including ~3,350 tonnes central bank reserves and ~9,100 tonnes private household holdings)
  - Thailand (~4,500 tonnes, largely private household ownership)
  - Turkey (~4,000 tonnes with high private and household savings)
  - Saudi Arabia (~3,100 tonnes with high private family holdings)
  - Russia (~2,332 tonnes with high central bank reserves and moderate private holdings)
  - Italy (~2,451 tonnes with strong central bank holdings)
  - France (~2,437 tonnes)

=== National gold reserve of India ===
With 880.5 tons of official national gold reserves, India was globally ranked 8th in terms of national gold reserve in May 2026.

- Gold as the historic standard for the global trade:

Gold standard or gold-backed monetary system, from the 1870s to the early 1920s, late 1920s to 1932 and from 1944 until 1971, was the basis for the international monetary system in which the standard economic unit of account was defined by a fixed quantity of gold. In 1971 the United States unilaterally terminated convertibility of the US dollar to gold, effectively ending the Bretton Woods system.

- Dedollarisation and push for return to gold as the global standard

However, due to various reasons several prominent nations are leading the dedollarisation to reduce the use of the U.S. dollar in reserves, trade invoicing and settlement, cross-border finance, and domestic transactions, to gain greater economic independence, reducing exposure to U.S. monetary and sanctions policy (weaponisation of dollar by Western Bloc), lowering currency mismatch and transaction costs, and building local market infrastructure. In 2023, BNN Bloomberg reported that the reserve status of the US dollar was declining more rapidly than commonly acknowledged, with the global share of US dollars in reserves decreased in 2022 at a rate ten times faster than the average speed observed over the past twenty years, as several nations sought alternative options following the sanctions imposed due to the Russian invasion of Ukraine. Accounting for exchange rate adjustments, the dollar had experienced an approximate 11% decrease in market share since 2016, doubling that figure since 2008. According to the IMF's Currency Composition of Official Foreign Exchange Reserves (COFER) survey the share of reserves held in U.S. dollars by central banks fell from 71 percent in 1999 to 59 percent in 2021.

== Silver ==
BIS introduced hallmarking for silver jewelry in December 2005 under IS 2112, the standard specification for 'Hallmarking of Silver Jewellery/Artefacts'.

== Assaying & Hallmarking Centre ==
The testing of the jewelry as well as the hallmarking is done by approved Assaying & Hallmarking Centres present across all over nation. These are private undertakings approved as well as monitored by the BIS.

== See also ==
- Gold import policy of India
- Certification marks in India
- ISI mark
