= Edward Redd =

American politician and physician

Member of the Utah House of Representatives from the 4th district
- In office January 1, 2013 – January 2, 2019
- Preceded by: David Butterfield
- Succeeded by: Dan Johnson

Personal details
- Party: Republican
- Education: Brigham Young University (BS); University of Utah (MD)
- Website: edredd.com

Edward H. Redd is an American politician and physician who served as a member of the Utah House of Representatives from 2013 to 2019 since January 1, 2013.

== Early life and education ==
Redd was raised in Murray, Utah. He was educated in the Granite School District, participating in science and music and excelling in auto mechanics. He started his own business doing custom plowing at the age of 11 continuing until leaving on a mission for the LDS church at the age of 19. After serving a mission to Southern Brazil, he continued his education at Brigham Young University, earning a degree in chemistry and graduating with honors.

After earning his undergraduate degree, Redd earned a medical degree at the University of Utah School of Medicine. He completed his internship and residency in internal medicine at Oregon Health & Science University.

== Career ==
Redd then practiced internal medicine for 16 years in Logan before the Bear River City, Utah Health Department hired him as deputy director and medical officer, where he oversees health issues for Cache, Box Elder, and Rich counties.

In addition to his responsibilities at the health department, he has served as chairman of the Cache Valley Air Quality Task Force, medical director of IHC Hospice, and emergency department physician at Logan Regional Hospital. He has also farmed wheat and other crops in Lewiston, Utah for 14 years and managed an apartment complex in Logan for ten years.

== Elections ==
- 2014: Redd ran unopposed in the primary and general election, winning the general election with 4,596 votes (100%).
- 2012: Redd challenged the incumbent David Butterfield in the Republican Primary Election, winning with 1,483 votes (58.8%) to Butterfield's 1,037 votes (41.2%). He faced Democrat Doug Thompson in the general election. Redd won with 8,107 votes (70.28%) to Thompson's 3,429 votes (29.72%).
- 2016: During the 2016 General Session, Redd served on the Social Services Appropriations Subcommittee, the House Health and Human Services Committee, and the House Law Enforcement and Criminal Justice Committee.
