= Response to the Opioid Crisis in New Jersey =

Policy

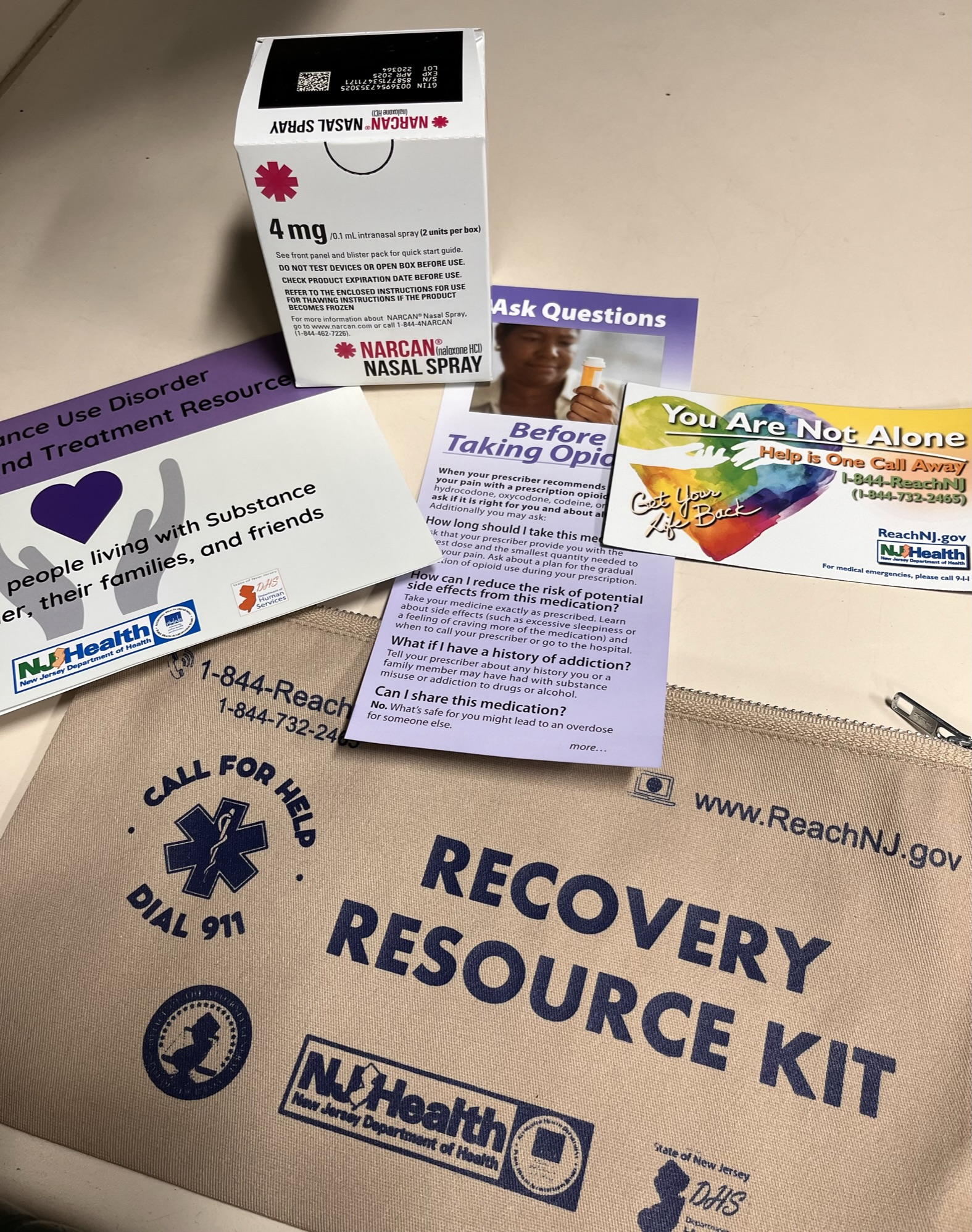
This recovery resource kit is distributed by EMS providers to patients who have overdosed, as part of NJ's "leave-behind" policy.

Fentanyl. 2 mg (white powder to the right) is a lethal dose in most people. US penny is 19 mm (0.75 in) wide.

New Jersey's most recent revised policy was issued September 7, 2022 pursuant to P.L.2021, c.152 which authorized opioid antidotes to be dispensed without a prescription or fee. Its goal is to make opioid antidotes widely available, reducing mortality from overdose while decreasing morbidity in conjunction with sterile needle access, fentanyl test strips, and substance use treatment programs. A $67 million grant provided by the Department of Health and Human Services provides funding for naloxone as well as recovery services. This policy enables any person to distribute an opioid antidote to someone they deem at risk of an opioid overdose, alongside information regarding: opioid overdose prevention and recognition, the administration of naloxone, circumstances that warrant calling 911 for assistance with an opioid overdose, and contraindications of naloxone. Instructions on how to perform resuscitation and the appropriate care of an overdose victim after the administration of an opioid antidote should also be included. Community first aid squads, professional organizations, police departments, and emergency departments are required to "leave-behind" naloxone and information with every person who overdosed or is at risk of overdosing.

== History ==
The opioid epidemic in the United States occurred in 3 waves:

- 1990: The over-prescription of opioids started; deaths traceable to prescription opioids spiked in 1999.
- 2010: Heroin became prevalent. New Jersey has a rate of heroin overdose 3 times the national average. However, heroin overdoses peaked in 2017 and began to decline in 2018.
- 2013: The proliferation of fentanyl and other synthetic opioids drove a significant increase in overdose deaths. In New Jersey, fentanyl-related overdoses became more common than those involving heroin in 2020.

NJ overdose deaths peaked in 2020 influenced by the COVID-19 pandemic. In 2020, the overdose death rate was 32.1 per 100,000 statewide but varies widely by county.

There were 40,893 admissions to NJ heroin abuse treatment programs in 2019, dropping to 33,030 in 2020. Admissions have not reached 2019 levels as of 2021.

Rates of hospital admissions from non-fatal opioid overdoses peaked in 2018, and steadily declined until 2021.

== Legislative response ==
The "Overdose Prevention Act" passed in 2013 focused on reducing fear or delay in initiating emergency medical response by providing immunity from arrest or prosecution for simple possession when a person seeks help for themself or another.

In 2017, Governor Chris Christie passed a non-partisan bill limiting all first-time opioid prescriptions to five days, and mandating that all health plans provide 6 months of SUD treatment and 28 days of inpatient care. This means health insurance providers must treat addiction like a disease, reducing wait times and the need for pre-authorization. Additionally, it outlined new education for opioid prescribers.

In 2020, a bill sponsored by Senator Vin Gopal amended P.L 2017 c.28, requiring naloxone to be co-prescribed in certain circumstances, such as:

- prescription of 50 morphine milligram equivalents per day
- prescription to anyone with a history of substance use disorder
- anyone simultaneously prescribed a benzodiazepine.

Later, public health officials shifted their focus to harm reduction, and in 2021 Governor Murphy passed 3 bills that promoted distribution of sterile needles, decriminalized possession of a syringe, and established local overdose review teams.

New Jersey has fully integrated emergency medical services into the Overdose Mapping and Application program provided by New Jersey State Police, making it the first state with 100% overdose data integration between EMS organizations and police. It also created the Five Minutes to Help curriculum that trains all emergency responders in deploying naloxone.

In March 2023, Governor Phil Murphy established the Opioid Recovery and Remediation Fund, which will divide over $600 million from settlements with pharmaceutical companies and pharmacy chains among the state's municipalities. This bill follows Executive Order No. 305, which first established how opioid settlement funds would be used.
