= Non Polluting Vehicle mark =

Motor vehicle certification mark

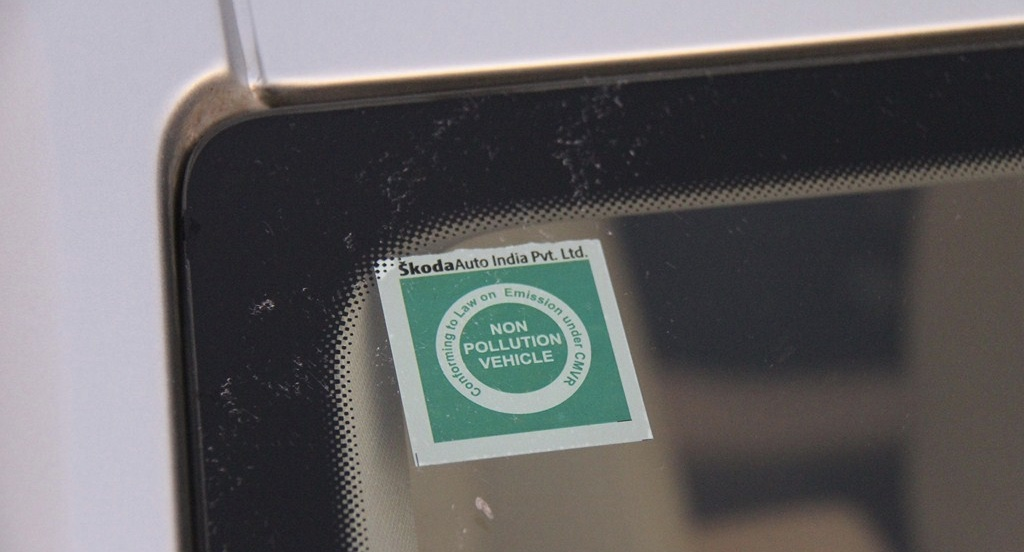
- Certifying agency: Central Pollution Control Board of India
- Effective region: India
- Product category: Automobiles
- Legal status: Mandatory

The Non Polluting Vehicle mark is a mandatory certification mark required on all new motor vehicles sold in India. The mark certifies that the motor vehicle conforms to the relevant version of the Bharat Stage emission standards. This certification for a brand new vehicle has a limited validity of 6 months from the date of sale of the vehicle. After this, the vehicle has to be tested afresh. The vehicle is tested in the car companies garage during the years maintenance and a renewed certificate has to be obtained. The certificate thus issued on a used vehicle is the Pollution Under Control certificate. The sticker can be removed after buying the vehicle.
