= Tuna-Dolphin GATT Case (I and II) =

Trade dispute over fishing between the US and Mexico

Since 1970s, there has been on going trade disputes between Mexico (and other tuna exporters) against the United States. The complaints were taken to General Agreement on Tariffs and Trade (GATT) committee and its 1995 successor; the World Trade Organization (WTO). The case became known as Tuna-Dolphin I, Tuna-Dolphin II and US-Tuna II (Mexico). Complaints concerned the USA embargo on yellowfin tuna and yellowfin tuna product imports that used purse-seine fishing methods and the labeling there of. Purse-seine fishing has resulted in a high number of dolphin kills.

== Background ==
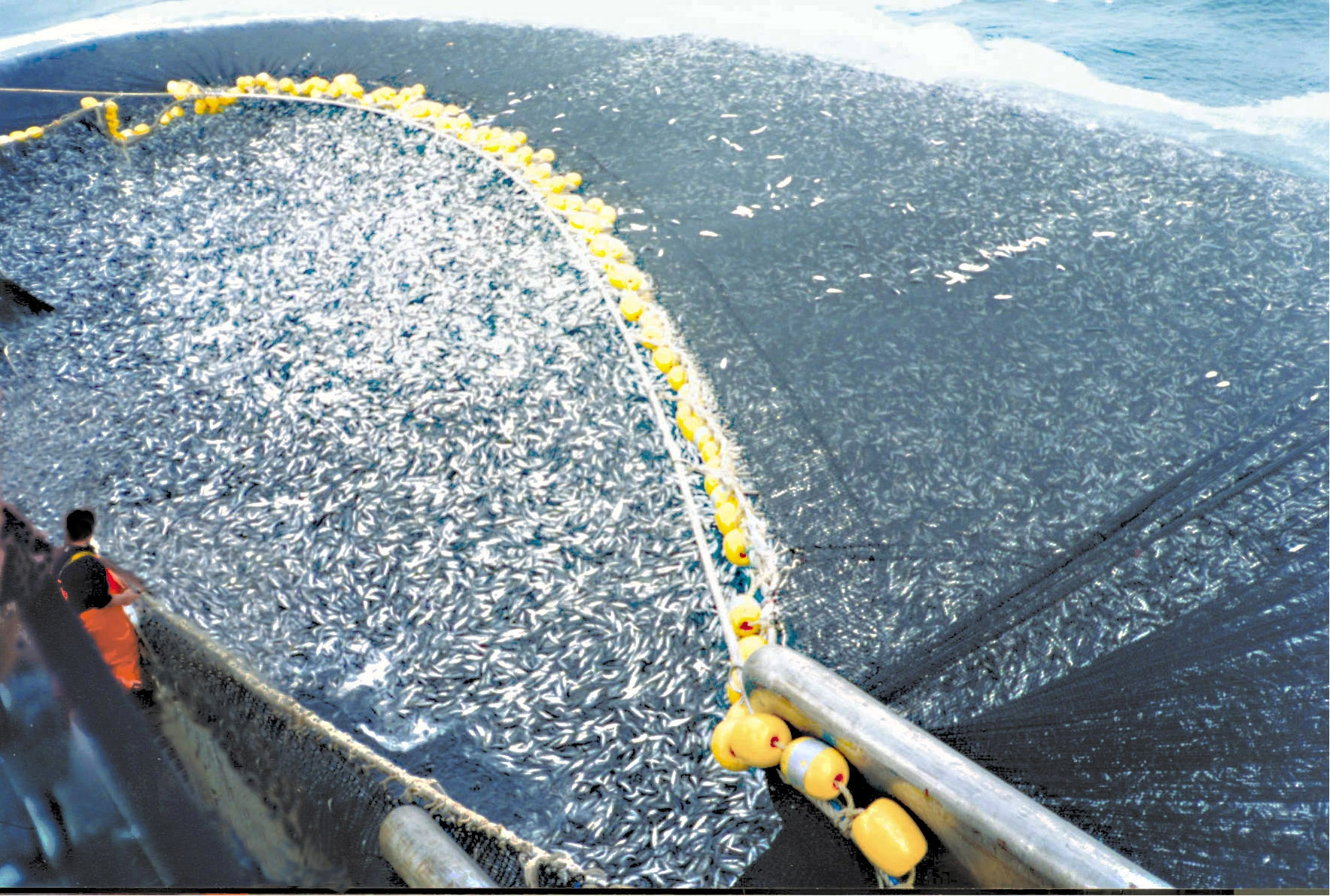
About 400 tons (360 tonne) of Chilean jack mackerel (Trachurus murphyi) are caught by a Chilean purse seiner off of Peru

The history of "purse-seine" net fishing for yellowfin tuna has been the preferred fishing technology of choice for many parts of the world over the last three decades. This type of fishing involves the use of two boats, the primary fishing vessel, and the "seine skiff" motorboat. Once the school of fish is located, the seine skiff goes out and encircles the school and deploys a net around the perimeter to capture the fish and returns to the main fishing vessel to complete the circle at the end of the net. Once this happens the net is reeled in with cables and the entire contents are gathered into the fishing vessel for processing. The problem with this type of fishing is the indirect catch and killing of many dolphins. This is due to the tendency of these dolphins to swim above schools of yellowfin tuna which occurs in the Eastern Tropical Pacific (ETP) Ocean. Many fishermen locate schools of tuna by observing the dolphins on the surface. So, the issue becomes that in the ETP many fishermen are intentionally encircling these dolphins in order to get to the tuna below resulting in mass casualties and drowning of dolphins. There are methods however which can reduce this bycatch of dolphins and reduce the mortality rate for these animals. Dolphin casualties in the ETP Ocean have led to the initial ban on tuna imports from Mexico which have been harvested using this controversial purse-seine fishing technique. According to NOAA, since the 1950s there have been approximately 6 million incidental dolphin kills.

== Tuna-Dolphin I case ==
=== Marine Mammal Protection Act of 1972 ===
The controversy and initial ban by United States on tuna imports from Mexico was based on the "taking" prohibition in the MMPA (Marine Mammal Protection Act of 1972). The MMPA requires a general prohibition on "taking" and importation into the United States of marine mammals including (harassment, hunting, killing, capture, or any attempts thereof) unless explicitly authorized. The goal of this Act being that reducing incidental kill and injury rates of marine mammals by commercial fishermen. The provisions in the MMPA are applicable to tuna caught in the ETP off the coast of North, Central and South America. Specifically these rules apply to the taking of marine mammals incidental to the harvest of yellowfin tuna as well as the importation of said yellowfin tuna harvested in the ETP. This rule is enforced by the NMFS National Marine Fisheries Service, while the importation is enforced by the United States Custom Service.

As clearly stated in Section 101(a)(2) of the MMPA "The Secretary of Treasury shall ban the importation of commercial fish or fish products which have been caught with commercial fishing technology which results in the incidental kill or serious injury of ocean mammals in excess of United States standards". According to Section 101(a)(2)(B), the importation of yellowtail tuna harvested using purse-seine nets in the ETP is prohibited unless the government of the importing country can show that it has a program comparable to the average rate of taking in United States for reducing marine mammal bycatch. It is on the burden of the country requesting a finding and they must show through documentary evidence that taking rates are comparable. Under Section 101(a)(2)(B) of MMPA there are special prerequisites for determining average incidental taking rates as comparable to those subjected of the United States commercial fleets. The average incidental taking rate (meaning dolphins killed as purse-seine nets are deployed) for any country's tuna fleet may not exceed 1.25 the average taking rate of US vessels in the same period. Furthermore, species of Eastern Spinner Dolphins and coastal spotted dolphins for one year may not exceed 15% and 2% for these species comparable to US fleets.

=== 1990 US-Mexico tuna embargo ===
On August 28, 1990, pursuant to court orders, the US government imposes embargo on yellowfin tuna imports harvested with purse-sein netting in the Eastern Tropical Pacific Ocean. This remains in place until the Secretary of commerce can show compliance with MMPA standards. This embargo initially affected Mexico, Venezuela, Vanuatu, Panama and Ecuador. On a revised embargo effective March 26, 1991 yellowfin tuna and other "light meat" tuna that could potentially contain yellowfin, according to harmonized system tariff headings are prohibited for import unless the importer can provide written evidence that no yellowfin tuna were harvested using purse-seine fishing techniques. This can be tracked by the NOAA Form 370-1 which is required "Yellowfin Tuna certificate of origin" and it is required to submit by the country of origin. Since Mexico did not want to comply with the new standards of modifying their fishing techniques, no products were accepted from origin of Mexico into the United States.

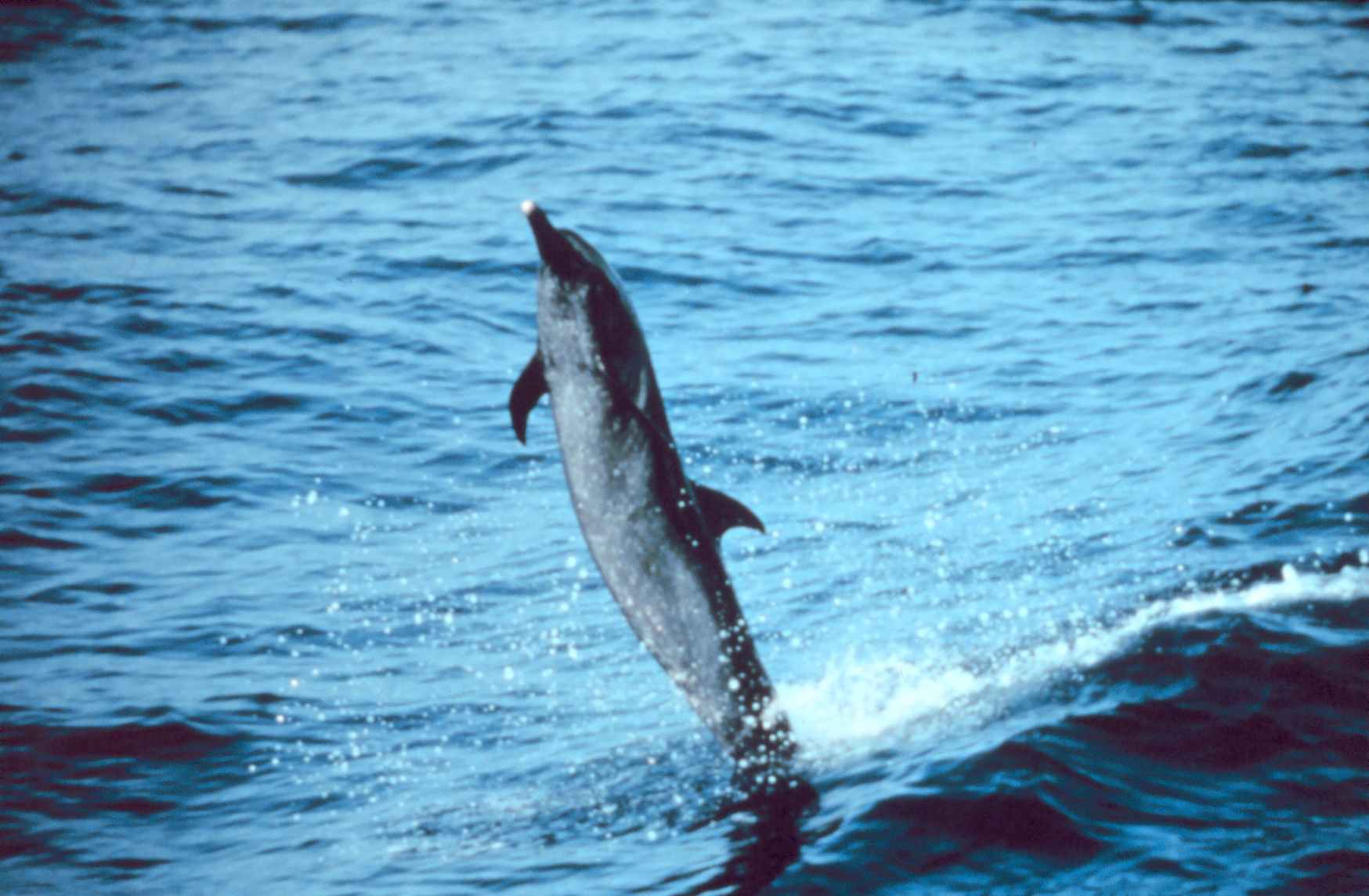
A pantropical spotted dolphin (Stenella attenuata). Photo courtesy of the National Oceanic and Atmospheric Administration (NOAA)

=== Mexico complaint against MMPA and GATT response ===
Beginning November 1990, Mexico started to bring the complaint to the US. The complaint then went through GATT (General Agreement on Tariffs and Trade) dispute resolution system. This became known as the Tuna-Dolphin (I) case. Mexico argued that the US MMPA product ban on tuna imports was inconsistent with the provisions of GATT. Arguing that the ban was inconsistent with Article XI, Article XIII, Article III of GATT. Mexico also claimed that the embargo did not meet the exceptions of Article XX. Article III refers to the National treatment provision and the fact that countries must apply tariffs equally to similar products of all other contracting parties. This also brings to debate the Product vs. process debate. Also known as PPM's (Process and Production Methods), referring to desire of some countries to regulate international trade on like for like goods on the basis of their process technologies or harvesting techniques in this case. Although the intention of the embargo is to bring to light the externalities of dolphin casualties due to the purse-seine harvesting techniques, the issue of PPMs is that the process is irrelevant if the product is the same. Developing countries have historically been wary of including PPM's in the WTO. The fear being that this will create an imposition of environmental, technological and other qualitative standards with high thresholds set by industrialized countries thus creating a technical disadvantage for developing countries. Essentially what Mexico argues is that MMPA is discriminating against like products based on their production methods. Article XI addresses the quantitative restriction provision which involves the dispute over embargoes vs. tariffs. Article XI says that a country is permitted to impose tariffs as a trade restriction but prohibits any type of non-tariff restriction such as quotas or limiting importing/ exporting licenses. Further, Mexico argues the Article XX provision of GATT is inconsistent with that of the MMPA. Specifically Article XX(b) and XX(g) which refer to the allowance of trade restrictions when it is deemed "necessary to protect human, animal or plant life or health" or "relating to the conservation of exhaustible natural resources". The issue with Article XX is that even while it may be valid, it cannot be applied outside the jurisdiction of the United States, hence making the argument in the favor of Mexico.

The outcome of this challenge fell in the favor of Mexico however these findings were not adopted formally due to the upcoming NAFTA negotiations, however the argument was revisited in the Dolphin Tuna II case in 1992.

== Tuna-Dolphin II case ==
The GATT Tuna-Dolphin II case was brought against the United States by the European Economic Community (EEC) and the Netherlands in June 1992, who claimed that the U.S. did not have the right to place embargoes on intermediary nations. The Marine Mammal Protection Act (MMPA) places countries involved in the importation of yellowfin tuna or yellowfin tuna products into the United States, into two separate categories: primary nations and intermediary nations.

1. Primary nation: a nation that directly exports yellowfin tuna or yellowfin tuna products from its country (i.e. exports to United States)
2. Intermediary nation: a nation that exports yellowfin tuna or yellowfin tuna products to the United States, and that receives imports, in its country, of yellowfin tuna or yellowfin tuna products that are subject to the primary nation embargo outlined in Section 101(a)(2)(B) of the MMPA.

For an intermediary nation, the MMPA requires its government to "…certify and provide reasonable proof to the Secretary of Commerce that it has not imported, within the previous six months, any yellowfin tuna or yellowfin tuna products that are subject to a direct ban on importation to the United States." If the intermediary nation cannot provide this proof, then its yellowfin tuna or yellowfin tuna products are banned from importation into the United States. The EEC and the Netherlands argued that this ban violated Articles XI, III, and not supportable by XX of the GATT.

=== Issues ===
==== Article XI and III ====
The EEC and the Netherlands argued that the intermediary nation embargo constituted as a "quantitative" restriction, and as such, it was in violation of Article XI of the GATT, which clearly forbids the enforcement of any prohibitions or restrictions other than "duties, taxes, or charges." With respect to Article III, they claimed that the measures of the intermediary nation embargo could not be considered as "the enforcement at the time or point of importation of an internal law, regulation, or requirement which applied equally to the imported product and the like domestic product." The EEC and the Netherlands argued that domestic measure only applied to limiting incidental dolphin mortality, but did not regulate the sale of tuna; whereas, in the case of intermediary nations, the border measure outright banned the importation of tuna if they could not certify that they had not, during the previous six months, imported yellowfin tuna or yellowfin tuna products subject to the primary nation embargo. They based their argument on a note in the GATT report that brought further clarification to the meaning of Article III. It states that, "any law, regulation, or requirement…which applies to an imported product and to the like domestic product and is…enforced in the case of the imported product at the time or point of importation, is nevertheless to be regarded as…a law, regulation, or requirement subject to the provisions of Article III.

Lastly, the EEC and the Netherlands contended that the note to Article III only pertained to products "as such." The ban on tuna being exported from intermediary nations was entirely policy-based, versus product-based.

==== Article XX (g) and (b) ====
The United States argued that regardless of whether its embargo measures violated Articles XI and III, they were covered under Article XX (g) and (b) as measures (1) "relating to the conservation of an exhaustible resource," and (2) "necessary to protect the life and health of dolphins," respectively.

==== Article XX (g) ====
The EEC and the Netherlands argued that the species needing conservation had to be within the jurisdictional territory of the nation enforcing the measure. In addition, they stated that United States measures were not related to the conservation of an exhaustible natural resource, as they did not consider dolphins as such. Moreover, the EEC and the Netherlands argued that United States measures were not taken in conjunction with "domestic restrictions on production or consumption."

The United States rebutted by claiming that nowhere in Article XX (g), was there any mention of the resource needing conservation having to be within the jurisdictional territory of the country enforcing the measure. To support its argument, the U.S. cited a previous GATT case "U.S.-prohibition of imports of tuna and tuna products from Canada," noting that no such jurisdictional limitation was found, and that the resource being conserved was in fact, outside the jurisdiction of any country. The United States also claimed that its embargo measures were in fact taken in conjunction with restrictions on domestic production and consumption, and that they met the requirement of the preamble to Article XX.

==== Article XX (b) ====
Arguments regarding jurisdictional territory were the same as for Article XX (g). While the EEC and the Netherlands argued that United States measures "were not necessary within the meaning of Article XX (b)," the United States rebutted, claiming that (1) the measures were necessary to achieve the policy goal of protecting the life and health of dolphins, and (2) they met the requirements of the preamble to Article XX.

=== Rulings ===
==== Articles XI and III ====
For Articles XI and III, the GATT panel ruled in favor of the EEC and the Netherlands. For Article XI, the panel agreed that the United States embargoes on yellowfin tuna and yellowfin tuna products were in fact "prohibitions or restrictions," not "duties, taxes, or other charges." For Article III, after reviewing the note to it mentioned above, the panel concluded that this provision could only be applied with respect to a measure which "applies to an imported product and to the like domestic product." They also agreed with the EEC and the Netherlands on the fact that Article III's purpose only pertains to the conditions for treatment comparisons between domestic and importing countries' like products, not their policies and practices.

==== Articles XX (g) and (b) ====
For both Articles XX (g) and (b), the panel ruled in favor of the United States with regard to the dispute over jurisdiction. Like the United States, they too, could not find any content with the GATT that alluded to the exhaustible resource needing conservation or protection, having to be within the jurisdictional territory of the country enforcing the measure.

==== Article XX (g) ====
After carefully examining the relationship between United States measures and its goal of dolphin conservation, the panel came to the conclusion that banning the tuna would not in itself conserve the dolphins; only policy changes would, which they felt was not within the original purpose of the GATT. The GATT was only supposed to deal with member states' products, not their processes or policies.

==== Article XX (b) ====
To determine whether United States measures for dolphin protection were "necessary," the panel first examined what the meaning of this word meant. The United States argued that necessary meant "needed," whereas, the EEC and the Netherland felt it meant "indispensable" or "unavoidable." To support their argument, they referred to a previously adopted panel report which interpreted "necessary" as meaning "no alternative measures" exist. The panel also agreed with this interpretation, and felt, once again, that banning yellowfin tuna and tuna products was not a measure that was necessary to protect dolphins; the only way to protect dolphins would be for intermediary nations to change their policies and practices, which was not within the original purpose of the GATT to regulate. Furthermore, the panel felt that banning tuna from primary and intermediary nations, regardless of whether their practices harmed or killed dolphins, but rather based on the fact of whether their practices were comparable to that of the United States, made it seem as if the United States was forcing primary and intermediary nations to adopt its fishing policies; this clearly was never the purpose of the GATT. For these reasons, the panel did not rule in favor of the United States.

== Dolphin Protection Consumer Information Act ==
DPCIA, or Dolphin Protection Consumer Information Act was an amendment to the Marine Mammal Protection Act (MMPA) of 1972 which would support the International Dolphin Conservation Program and management of tuna in the Eastern Tropical Pacific Ocean. Findings by Congress have shown that nations fishing for tuna in the ETP have achieved significant reductions in dolphin mortality by participating countries. This Act lifts the ban on imports from countries that are participating in the IDCP, and reductions have shown to be of great significance from hundreds of thousands of dolphin fatalities, to that of only 5,000 annually.

== Dolphin safe labeling ==
Under section 5 of the Federal Trade Commission Act (15 U.S.C 45) it is a violation for any producer, importer, exporter, or seller of any tuna product for sale in the US to include the labeling of "dolphin-safe" unless it can be clearly shown that this product was harvested under methods not harmful to dolphins. The label does not restrict methods harmful to non-dolphin marine life. Oversight under this agreement is additionally restricted to vessels using purse-seine nets, which must meet certain requirements in order to be considered "dolphin-safe":

1. Vessels cannot harvest tuna in the ETP without an observer on board from the DPCIA certifying that the practices were sound in reducing dolphin mortality
2. There can be no harvesting on the open seas engaging in driftnet fishing where dolphins are purposely encircled.

== International Dolphin Conservation Program Act ==
The International Dolphin Conservation Program Act (IDCPA) which was passed August 15, 1997, amended the Dolphin Consumer Information Act of 1990, by changing both the labeling standards and meaning of "dolphin safe." It codified the Declaration of Panama, an international agreement signed by Belize, Colombia, Costa Rica, Ecuador, France, Honduras, Mexico, Panama, Spain, the United States, Vanuatu, and Venezuela. The Declaration established the International Dolphin Conservation Program for purposes of reducing dolphin mortality, while at the same time creating a viable yellowfin tuna harvesting program. The IDCPA allows tuna caught by purse-seine nets, into the United States if there were no observed dolphin mortalities. Lastly, the term "dolphin-safe" has been modified to mean no dolphin mortalities occurred, instead of banning tuna caught through the use of purse-seine nets.

== Earth Island vs. Hogarth ==
One of the requirements of the IDCPA was that the National Oceanic and Atmospheric Administration (NOAA) carry out three studies to determine whether dolphins were being harmed by the tuna fisheries. The Secretary of Commerce, acting through the National Marine Fisheries Service (NMFS) was then required to make an Initial Finding on these fisheries methods by March 31, 1999, and a Final Finding by December 31, 2002.

As required, the Secretary released his Initial Findings in 1999, in which he determined that the fishery was not having any adverse effects on dolphin populations. Upset with the lack of scientific evidence in the report to support this claim, several environmental organizations sued NMFS. The district court granted summary judgment and vacated the Initial Finding. When NMFS appealed the decision to the Ninth Circuit, the court affirmed the district court's decision, maintaining that the requirement for the agency was to "reach a definitive answer, not a "default finding" based on the lack of evidence. In 2002, NMFS released its Final Finding, once again, concluding that the fishery was not having any impacts on dolphin populations. In response, Earth Island and a number of other environmental organizations sued the agency once again.

The district court ruled in favor of Earth Island, stating in the end that Final Finding was "arbitrary and capricious," based on the fact that (1) NMFS did not carry out the studies required by the MMPA, (2) considering the best available evidence, the agency's "no adverse impact" finding was implausible, and (3) the court found there to be evidence of "political meddling." Upon NMFS's appeal to the Ninth Circuit, after reviewing the legal grounds on which the district court based their decision, the court found that NMFS had inadequately conducted two of the three studies. Because of this, the court vacated the Secretary's Final Finding.

== US- Tuna II (Mexico) ==
Starting 2008, Mexico raised complaints with the World Trade Organization's (WTO) about United States import restrictions and use of dolphin safe labeling on Tuna products. It was taken to the body's dispute settle system and the case was given the short title US-Tuna II (Mexico) and case number DS381.

Mexico argued, that US conditions for "dolphin-safe" labeling were "discriminatory and unnecessary," and that they violated Articles 2.1, 2.2, and 2.4 of the Technical Barriers to Trade (TBT). For Article 2.1, the panel rejected Mexico's claims that U.S. dolphin-safe labeling measures discriminated against Mexican tuna products. For Article 2.4, ruled in favor of the U.S., concluding that its dolphin-safe labeling was not in violation of Article 2.4, which requires "technical regulations to be based on relevant international standards where possible." For Article 2.4, however, the panel did agree with Mexico that the United States dolphin-safe labeling measures were more trade restrictive than necessary to achieve their objectives.

The United States and Mexico both appealed. Two reports were issued on the discriminatory aspects of the US legislation regarding dolphin-safe labels. The WTO Panel Report was published on 15 September 2011 and the WTO's Appellate Body Report was published on 16 May 2012.

The US government has strongly opposed these decisions and continues to improve the Dolphin Safe implementation procedures to expand provisions in keeping with the WTO concerns without weakening the Dolphin Safe label standards.

On November 20, 2015, the WTO Appellate Body ruled against the United States.

The US strongly opposes the claims by the WTO, noting that US Dolphin Safe standards provide more protection to dolphins than other weaker standards promoted by the government of Mexico and the Inter-American Tropical Tuna Commission (mainly concerned with promoting tuna fishing) and that the US has strengthened review of Dolphin Safe tuna in other areas of the world.

Hundreds of environmental organizations condemned the WTO for putting support for free trade over environmental considerations, such as protection of dolphins.

In January 2019, the WTO ruled in favor of the US that the labelling was compliant and consistent with WTO rules.
