= Agreement on Technical Barriers to Trade =

Treaty of the World Trade Organization promoting technical trade

The Agreement on Technical Barriers to Trade, commonly referred to as the TBT Agreement, is an international treaty administered by the World Trade Organization. It was last renegotiated during the Uruguay Round of the General Agreement on Tariffs and Trade, with its present form entering into force with the establishment of the WTO at the beginning of 1995, binding on all WTO members.

== Purpose ==
The TBT exists to ensure that technical regulations, standards, testing, and certification procedures do not create unnecessary obstacles to trade. The agreement prohibits technical requirements created in order to limit trade, as opposed to technical requirements created for legitimate purposes such as consumer or environmental protection. In fact, its purpose is to avoid unnecessary obstacles to international trade and to give recognition to all WTO members to protect legitimate interests according to own regulatory autonomy, although promoting the use of international standards. The list of legitimate interests that can justify a restriction in trade is not exhaustive and it includes protection of environment, human and animal health and safety.

== Structure of the agreement on technical barriers to trade ==
The TBT Agreement can be divided into five parts. The first part defines the scope of the Agreement which includes "[a]ll products, including industrial and agricultural" but not sanitary and phytosanitary measures. The second part sets out the obligations and principles concerning technical regulations. The third part addresses conformity and assessments of conformity. The fourth part deals with information and assistance, including the obligation of nations to provide assistance to each other in drafting technical regulations. Lastly the fifth part provides for the creation of the Committee on Technical Barriers to Trade and sets out the dispute settlement procedures.

== Scope of application ==
According to Art.1, this agreement covers all industrial and agricultural products, with the exception of services, sanitary and phytosanitary measures (as defined by Agreement on the Application of Sanitary and Phytosanitary Measures) and "purchasing specifications prepared by governmental bodies for production or consumption requirements of governmental bodies" (Art. 1.4).

The scope of the TBT consists of substantive scope (what measures are included), personal scope (to whom the measures apply), and temporal scope.

=== Substantive scope ===
There are three categories of substantive measures found in Annex 1 of the TBT; technical regulations, standard, and conformity assessment. The Appellate Body in EC-Asbestos held these to be a limited class of measures.

Technical regulation: Annex 1.1

This lays down product characteristics or their related processes and production methods, including the applicable administrative provisions, with which compliance is mandatory. It may also include or deal exclusively with terminology, symbols, packaging, marking, or labelling requirements as they apply to a product, process, or production method. For example, a law requiring that batteries be rechargeable or a law requiring that wine be sold in green glass bottles is a technical regulation within the meaning of the TBT Agreement.

The rules specifically applicable to technical regulations are set out in Articles 2 and 3 of the TBT Agreement. In EC-Asbestos, the Appellate Body laid down a number of considerations for the determination of technical regulations. First, for a measure to be a "technical regulation", it must stipulate or provide "product characteristics". With respect to the term "characteristics", the Appellate Body noted: The "characteristics" of a product include, in our view, any objectively definable "features", "qualities", "attributes", or other "distinguishing mark" of a product. Such "characteristics" might relate, inter alia, to a product's composition, size, shape, colour, texture, hardness, tensile strength, flammability, conductivity, density, or viscosity. Secondly, a "technical regulation" lays down product characteristics or their related PPMs "with which compliance is mandatory". According to the Appellate Body, it follows that, with respect to products, a "technical regulation" has the effect of prescribing or imposing one or more "characteristics"—"features", "qualities", "attributes", or other "distinguishing mark". Thirdly, the AB held that a "technical regulation" must "be applicable to an identifiable product or group of products".

==== Standard: annex 1.2 ====
A standard is a document approved by a recognized body that stipulates guidelines or characteristics that are not mandatory. It may include terminology, symbols, packaging or labelling requirements, and may apply to a product, process or production method. Standards are distinct from technical regulation in that they are not mandatory. Despite being voluntary, producers often have no choice but to comply with them for commercial practicality.

Standards are guided by Article 4 TBT and Codes of Good Practice.

==== Conformity assessment: annex 1.3 ====
A conformity assessment is a direct or indirect procedure used to determine the fulfillment of requirements in a technical regulation or standard. Conformity assessments may include sampling, testing, and inspections.

The rules for conformity assessment are outlined in Articles 5, 6, 7, 8 and 9 TBT.

=== Issues of scope ===
==== Determining whether a measure is a technical regulation or a standard ====
Whether a measure is a technical regulation as opposed to a standard centers on whether it is "mandatory".

The Panel and Appellate Body in Tuna-Dolphin GATT Case (I and II) held that the US labeling measures for dolphin-safe tuna was a technical regulation. The requirements were not compulsory for the sale of tuna in the US, however the requirements were compulsory for dolphin-safe certification. The Appellate Body stated that because the US provided no other methods of obtaining the dolphin-safe label, the requirement was binding, and therefore de jure mandatory. It appears from this decision that measures that attempt to obtain a monopoly over a specific label will be deemed technical regulations, but the test is ultimately on a case-by-case basis.

This decision has been criticised for construing the term "mandatory" too broadly, rendering the distinction between technical regulations and standards meaningless.

==== Application to non-product related processes ====
Labels such as "free-range", "organic", or "fair trade", denote a quality in the product that has no tangible effects. Whether labels regarding non-product related process ("NPRP") are technical regulations is the subject of controversy.

Annex 1.1 states that technical regulations apply to "product characteristics or their related process and production methods", implying that this does not extend to NPRPs. However the second sentence of Annex 1.1 and 1.2 omits the word "related", suggesting that technical regulations may apply to labelling. Some academics argue that sentence 2 is read in context of sentence 1, and should therefore be given narrower scope.

The Panel in Tuna-Dolphin GATT Case (I and II) did not clarify this issue, but held in that case that the dolphin-safe labeling was a technical regulation by reason of the second sentence. Accordingly, it may be assumed that labeling of NPRP-PPM products now fall under the scope of technical regulations.

== Key principles & obligations ==
=== Non-discrimination ===
Members must ensure that technical regulations and standards do not accord treatments less favorable to imported products compared to the ones granted to like products of national origin or creating in any other country, as established respectively in Art. 2.1 and Annex 3.D. This principle applies also to conformity assessment procedures, that have to "grant access for suppliers of like products originating in the territories of other members under conditions no less favorable than those accorded to suppliers of like products of national origin or originating in any other country in a comparable situation" (Art. 5.1 and 5.1.1).

=== Avoidance of unnecessary barriers to trade ===
Article 2.2 obliges Members not to create unnecessary obstacles to international trade and, on this basis, to ensure that "technical restrictions are not more trade restrictive than necessary to fulfil a legitimate objective". The Article provides an inclusive list of legitimate objectives including national security requirements and the protection of animal or plant life or health.

However Article 2.5 provides that where technical standards are for the purpose of one of the legitimate objectives listed in Article 2.2 and in accordance with relevant international standards they are presumed not to violate Article 2.2. (PDF here.)

=== Harmonization around international standards ===
When international standards exist, members shall use them as a basis for their technical regulations, standards and conformity assessment procedures, unless their use seems inappropriate or ineffective in certain circumstances (for example, for climatic or technological reasons) for achieving the pursued objective (Art. 2.4, 5.4 and Annex 3.D). To support this, the World Trade Organization Technical Barriers to Trade (TBT) Committee published the "Six Principles" guiding members in the development of international standards.

=== Notification requirements ===
The TBT Agreement also obliges States to notify each other of proposed technical barriers to trade. To give States the opportunity to raise their concerns before the measures come into force, members must allow reasonable time for Members to make comments, discuss their comments and to have their comments considered. Members must notify each other in relation to proposed TBT provisions when the following three conditions are satisfied:

- The measure must be a technical regulation or an evaluation of a conformity assessment procedure.
- There must either be no relevant international standard or, if there is, the measure must not conform to it.
- The technical regulation must have a considerable effect on international trade.

These criteria are broader than any of the obligations regarding the content of technical regulations which ensures that any issues which will subsequently be litigated can be identified at the earliest stage possible. However, in the case of "urgent problems of safety, health, environmental protection or national security" Article 2.10 provides an alternate procedure to expedite the process.

== Other informations ==
=== Adjudication of disputes ===
Under Article 14.1 disputes regarding the TBT Agreement are to be resolved by the Dispute Settlement Body in accordance with Articles XXII and XXIII of GATT. This requires parties to undergo the same consultation process as they would for issues arising under GATT and allows disputes involving issues arising under both the TBT Agreement and GATT to be resolved simultaneously. In spite of this very few cases concerning the TBT Agreement have been brought to the Panel.

The following list is an overview of the mechanisms that promote the TBT's mission:

A. All TBT members are required to establish "enquiry points" also known as "TBT Window" – offices that provide information about the country's technical regulations, test procedures, and adherence to various international standards.

B. A technical assistance program helps developing countries meet international standards and helps them get involved in the establishment of such standards.

== See also ==
- Codex Alimentarius
- World Trade Organization
