= Technical barriers to trade =

Technical barriers to trade (TBTs), a category of nontariff barriers to trade, are the widely divergent measures that countries use to regulate markets, protect their consumers, or preserve their natural resources (among other objectives), but they also can be used (or perceived by foreign countries as being used) to discriminate against imports in order to protect domestic industries.

The 2012 classification of non-tariff measures (NTMs) developed by the Multi-Agency Support Team (MAST), a working group of eight international organisations, classifies TBTs as one of 16 non-tariff measures (NTMs) chapters. In this classification, TBTs are classified as chapter B and defined as "Measures referring to technical regulations, and procedures for assessment of conformity with technical regulations and standards, excluding measures covered by the WTO's SPS Agreement". Here, technical barriers to trade refer to measures such as labelling requirements, standards on technical specifications and quality standards, and other measures protecting the environment. Chapter B also includes all conformity-assessment measures related to technical requirements, such as certification, testing and inspection. Other examples of TBTs are rules for product weight, size, or packaging; ingredient or identity standards; shelf-life restrictions; and import testing and certification procedures.

The Agreement on Technical Barriers to Trade gives rules for the use of such barriers. However, trade experts widely view TBTs as having great potential for being misused by importing countries as nontransparent (disguised or unclear) obstacles to trade. (See Transparency.).

The OECD has been working to make common standardization easier with the ISTR Template allowing common standards to aid in the implementation of the WTO Agreement.

== See also ==
- Sanitary and phytosanitary measures and agreements
- WTO Agreement on the Application of Sanitary and Phytosanitary Measures
