= Opioid intervention court =

Drug Treatment Court in the United States

Opioid Intervention Courts (OIC) are a modern innovation of the traditional drug court in the United States. OICs seek to medically treat and rehabilitate individuals convicted or facing conviction for drug-related offences.

The first OIC in the United States was established in 2017 in the city of Buffalo, New York, sparked by the fatal overdoses of three defendants awaiting a court appearance in a traditional drug court. The primary goal of Buffalo's OIC is to save lives.

Intervention begins within hours of arrest for qualifying offenders who choose to take advantage of the opportunity. Those who are arrested for non-violent actions and suffer an opioid use disorder may opt for an individualized program of medical assistance and counseling services.

For the duration of this program, prosecution of the participant's case is on hold, and many successful participants enter plea agreements or have their cases dismissed after that time period.
