= FPO mark =

Indian processed food certification mark

- Expansion: Fruit products order
- Certifying agency: Ministry of Food Processing Industries (India)
- Effective region: India
- Effective since: 1955
- Product category: Processed fruit products
- Legal status: Mandatory
- Mandatory since: 2006

The FPO mark is a certification mark mandatory on all processed fruit products sold in India such as packaged fruit beverages, fruit-jams, squashes, pickles, dehydrated fruit products, and fruit extracts, following the Food Safety and Standards Act of 2006. The FPO mark guarantees that the product was manufactured in a hygienic 'food-safe' environment, thus ensuring that the product is fit for consumption.

The standards have been in force since 1955 by the law of Fruit Products Order, after which the mark is named, but the mark itself got a mandatory status only after the Food Safety and Standards Act of 2006. A FPO license is, in fact, necessary to start a fruit processing industry in India. The agency that develops standards for this purpose and that which issues the mark is the Ministry of Food Processing Industries of the Government of India.

== FPO's specific requirement ==
1. Containers and labeling requirement
2. Limits of poisonous metals in fruit products
3. List of permissible harmless food colors
4. Limits for permitted preservatives in fruit products
5. Other permitted additives

== Application ==
The important documents that are required to be submitted to the Ministry of Food Processing in India during the time of filing application are listed below:

1. Product name
2. Candidate name
3. Corporation name
4. Address
5. Sample of product
