= ISI mark =

Indian standards-compliance mark for products

ISI
- Expansion: Indian Standards Institution
- Standards organization: Bureau of Indian Standards (formerly Indian Standards Institution)
- Effective region: India
- Effective since: 1950
- Product category: Industrial products
- Legal status: Mandatory for 90 products, (Note: As of February 2013.) advisory for others

The ISI mark is a standards-compliance mark for industrial products in India since 1950. The mark certifies that a product conforms to an Indian standard (IS) developed by the Bureau of Indian Standards (BIS), the national standards body of India. The ISI is an initialism of Indian Standards Institution, the name of the national standards body until 1 January 1978, when it was renamed to the Bureau of the Indian Standards. The ISI mark is mandatory for certain products to be sold in India, such as electrical appliances including switches, electric motors, wiring cables, heaters, kitchen appliances, etc., and other products like Portland cement, LPG valves, LPG cylinders, automotive tyres, etc. In the case of most other products, ISI marks are optional.

== Counterfeiting ==
It is very common in India to find products with fake ISI marks. That is, industrial traders cheat customers by affixing ISI marks on the product without actually being certified. Fake ISI marks usually do not carry

(i) the mandatory 7 or 8-digit license number (of the format CM/L-xxxxxxx, where x signifies a digit from the license number) required by BIS.
(ii) the IS number on top of the ISI mark which signifies the Indian standard a particular product is in compliance with.

For example, if a kitchen grinder's box has a small ISI mark on it with the ISI code of the appliance's wire, one can conclude that the wire is BIS-certified but the appliance itself is not an BIS-certified product. Counterfeiting ISI marks is a punishable offence by the law, but enforcement is uncommon.
