= Electrical equipment in hazardous areas =

Electrical equipment in places where fire or explosion hazards may exist

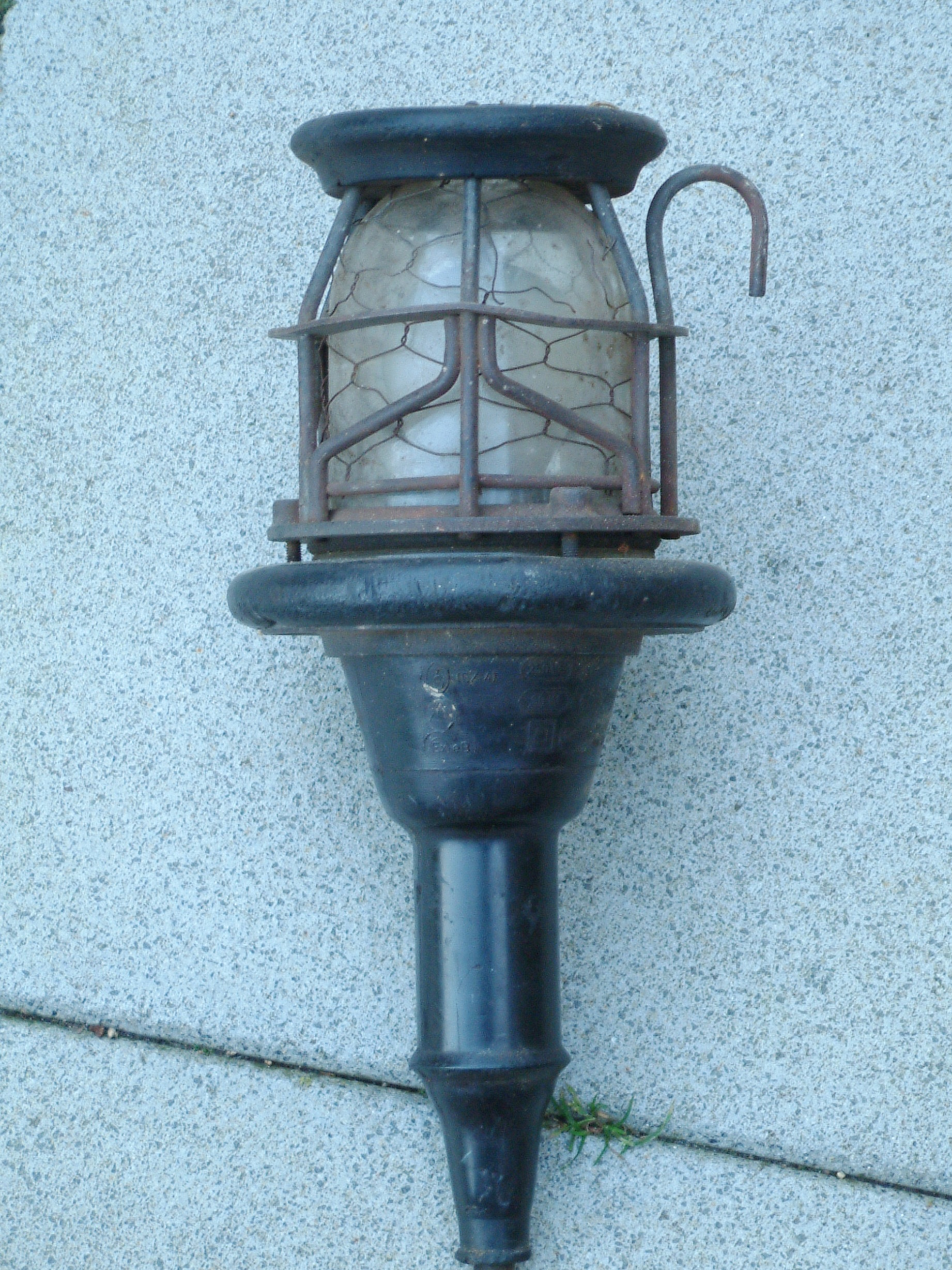
This inspection lamp is constructed so that it cannot set off an explosion when surrounded by specified flammable gases or dust.

In electrical and safety engineering, hazardous locations (HAZLOC, HazLoc, or hazloc /ˈhæzˌloʊk/) are places where fire or explosion hazards may exist. Sources of such hazards include gases, vapors, dust, fibers, and flyings, which are combustible or flammable. Electrical equipment installed in such locations can provide an ignition source, due to electrical arcing, or high temperatures. Standards and regulations exist to identify such locations, classify the hazards, and design equipment for safe use in such locations.

== Overview ==
A light switch may cause a small, harmless spark when switched on or off. In an ordinary household this is of no concern, but if a flammable atmosphere is present, the arc might start an explosion. In many industrial, commercial, and scientific settings, the presence of such an atmosphere is a common, or at least commonly possible, occurrence. Protecting against fire and explosion is of interest for both personnel safety as well as reliability reasons.

Several protection strategies exist. The simplest is to minimize the amount of electrical equipment installed in a hazardous location, either by keeping the equipment out of the area altogether, or by making the area less hazardous (for example, by process changes, or ventilation with clean air).

When equipment must be placed in a hazardous location, it can be designed to reduce the risk of fire or explosion. Intrinsic safety designs equipment to operate using minimal energy, insufficient to cause ignition. Explosion-proofing designs equipment to contain ignition hazards, prevent entry of hazardous substances, and, contain any fire or explosion that could occur.

Different countries have approached the standardization and testing of equipment for hazardous areas in different ways. Terminology for both hazards and protective measures can vary. Documentation requirements likewise vary. As world trade becomes more globalized, international standards are slowly converging, so that a wider range of acceptable techniques can be approved by national regulatory agencies.

The process of determining the type and size of hazardous locations is called classification. Classification of locations, testing and listing of equipment, and inspection of installation, is typically overseen by governmental bodies. For example, in the US by the Occupational Safety and Health Administration.

== Standards ==
=== North America ===
In the US, the independent National Fire Protection Association (NFPA) publishes several relevant standards, and they are often adopted by government agencies. Guidance on assessment of hazards is given in NFPA 497 (explosive gas) and NFPA 499 (dust). The American Petroleum Institute publishes analogous standards in RP 500 and RP505.

NFPA 70, the National Electrical Code (NEC), defines area classification and installation principles. NEC article 500 describes the NEC Division classification system, while articles 505 and 506 describe the NEC Zone classification system. The NEC Zone system was created to harmonize with IEC classification system, and therefore reduce the complexity of management.

Canada has a similar system with CSA Group standard C22.1, the Canadian Electrical Code, which defines area classification and installation principles. Two possible classifications are described, in Section 18 (Zones), and Appendix J (Divisions).

=== International Electrotechnical Commission ===
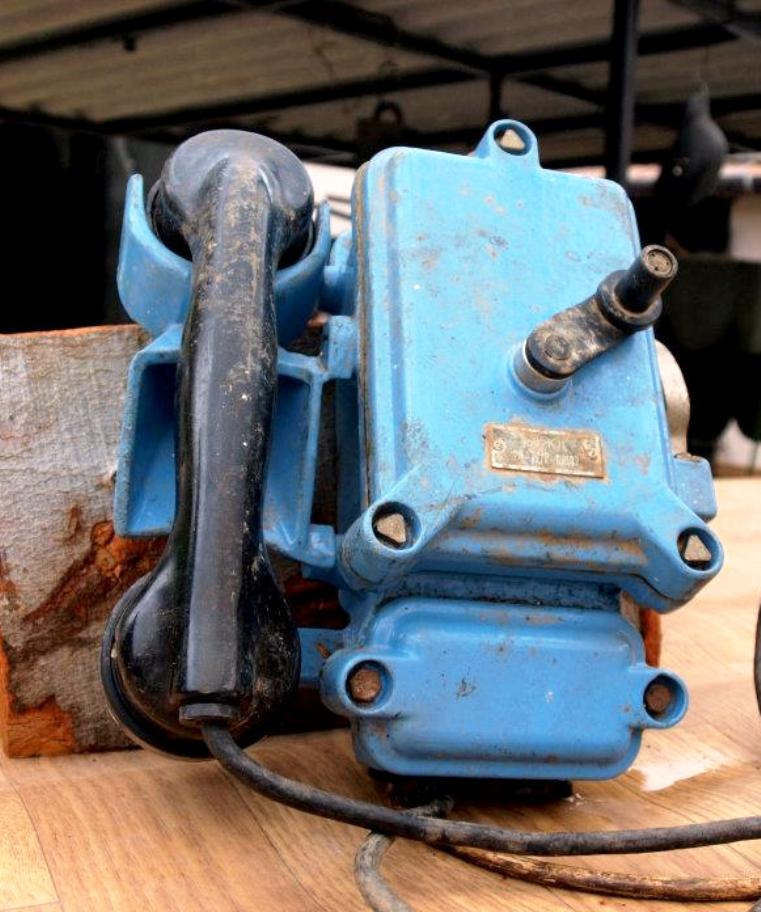
A telephone for use in mines, constructed so as not to cause external explosion of hazardous atmospheres. The heavy case is secured with tamper-resistant bolts to deter unauthorized opening of the case.

The International Electrotechnical Commission publishes the 60079 series of standards which defines a system for classification of locations, as well as categorizing and testing of equipment designed for use in hazardous locations, known as "Ex equipment". IEC 60079-10-1 covers classification of explosive gas atmospheres, and IEC 60079-10-2 explosive dust. Equipment is placed into protection level categories according to manufacture method and suitability for different situations. Unlike ATEX which uses numbers to define the safety "Category" of equipment (namely 1, 2, and 3), the IEC continued to utilise the method used for defining the safe levels of intrinsic safety namely "a" for zone 0, "b" for zone 1 and "c" for zone 2 and apply this Equipment Level of Protection to all equipment for use in hazardous areas since 2009.

The IEC 60079 standard set has been adapted for use in Australia and New Zealand and is published as the AS/NZS 60079 standard set.

== Hazards ==
In an industrial plant, such as a refinery or chemical plant, handling of large quantities of flammable liquids and gases creates a risk of exposure. Coal mines, grain mills, elevators, and similar facilities likewise present the risk of a clouds of dust. In some cases, the hazardous atmosphere is present all the time, or for long periods. In other cases, the atmosphere is normally non-hazardous, but a dangerous concentration can be reasonably foreseen—such as operator error or equipment failure. Locations are thus classified by type and risk of release of gas, vapor, or dust. Various regulations use terms such as class, division, zone, and group to differentiate the various hazards.

Often an area classification plan view is provided to identify equipment ratings and installation techniques to be used for each classified area. The plan may contain the list of chemicals with their group and temperature rating. The classification process requires the participation of operations, maintenance, safety, electrical and instrumentation professionals; and the use of process diagrams, material flows, safety data sheets, and other pertinent documents. Area classification documentations are reviewed and updated to reflect process changes.

=== Explosive gas ===
Typical gas hazards are from hydrocarbon compounds, but hydrogen and ammonia are also common industrial gases that are flammable.

Class I, Division 1 classified locations
An area where ignitable concentrations of flammable gases, vapors or liquids can exist all of the time or some of the time under normal operating conditions. A Class I, Division 1 area encompasses the combination of Zone 0 and Zone 1 areas.

Zone 0 classified locations
An area where ignitable concentrations of flammable gases, vapors or liquids are present continuously or for long periods of time under normal operating conditions. An example of this would be the vapor space above the liquid in the top of a tank or drum. The ANSI/NEC classification method consider this environment a Class I, Division 1 area. As a guide for Zone 0, this can be defined as over 1000 hours per year or more than 10% of the time.

Zone 1 classified location
An area where ignitable concentrations of flammable gases, vapors or liquids are likely to exist under normal operating conditions. As a guide for Zone 1, this can be defined as 10–1000 hours per year or 0.1–10% of the time.

Class I, Division 2 or Zone 2 classified locations
An area where ignitable concentrations of flammable gases, vapors or liquids are not likely to exist under normal operating conditions. In this area the gas, vapor or liquids would only be present under abnormal conditions (most often leaks under abnormal conditions). As a general guide for Zone 2, unwanted substances should only be present under 10 hours per year or 0–0.1% of the time.

Unclassified locations
Also known as non-hazardous or ordinary locations, these locations are determined to be neither Class I, Division 1 or Division 2; Zone 0, Zone 1 or Zone 2; or any combination thereof. Such areas include a residence or office where the only risk of a release of explosive or flammable gas would be such things as the propellant in an aerosol spray. The only explosive or flammable liquids are paint and brush cleaner. These are designated as very low risk of causing an explosion and are more of a fire risk (although gas explosions in residential buildings do occur). Unclassified locations in chemical and other plants are present where it is absolutely certain that the hazardous gas is diluted to a concentration below 25% of its lower flammability limit (or lower explosive limit (LEL)).

=== Combustible dusts ===
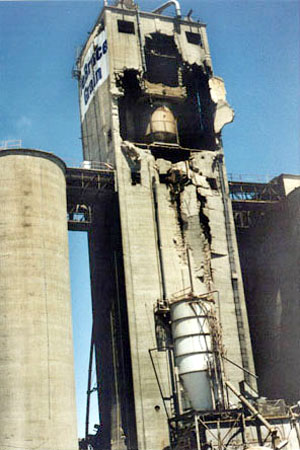
An explosion of dust at this grain elevator in Kansas killed five workers in 1998

Dust or other small particles suspended in air can explode.

==== NEC ====
Class	Division	Description
Class II	Division 1	ignitable concentrations of combustible dust can exist, under normal conditions
Class II	Division 2	ignitable concentrations of combustible dust are unlikely to exist normally
Class III	Division 1	ignitable fibers, or materials producing combustible flyings, are handled, manufactured or used
Class III	Division 2	easily ignitable fibers are stored or handled
Unclassified		Non-hazardous or ordinary locations. Determined to be none of the above.

==== United Kingdom ====
An old British standard used letters to designate zones. This has been replaced by a European numerical system, as set out in directive 1999/92/EU implemented in the UK as the Dangerous Substances and Explosives Atmospheres Regulations 2002.

Zone	Description
Zone 20	ignitable concentrations of dust, fibers, or flyings are present for long periods of time
Zone 21	ignitable concentrations of dust, fibers, or flyings are likely to exist under normal conditions
Zone 22	ignitable concentrations of dust, fibers, or flyings unlikely to exist under normal conditions

=== Gas and dust groups ===
Different explosive atmospheres have chemical properties that affect the likelihood and severity of an explosion. Such properties include flame temperature, minimum ignition energy, upper and lower explosive limits, and molecular weight. Empirical testing is done to determine parameters such as the maximum experimental safe gap (MESG), minimum igniting current (MIC) ratio, explosion pressure and time to peak pressure, spontaneous ignition temperature, and maximum rate of pressure rise. Every substance has a differing combination of properties but it is found that they can be ranked into similar ranges, simplifying the selection of equipment for hazardous areas.

Flammability of combustible liquids are defined by their flash-point. The flash-point is the temperature at which the material will generate sufficient quantity of vapor to form an ignitable mixture. The flash point determines if an area needs to be classified. A material may have a relatively low autoignition temperature yet if its flash-point is above the ambient temperature, then the area may not need to be classified. Conversely if the same material is heated and handled above its flash-point, the area must be classified for proper electrical system design, as it will then form an ignitable mixture.

Each chemical gas or vapour used in industry is classified into a gas group.

NEC Division System gas & dust groups
Area	Group	Representative materials
Class I, Divisions 1 & 2	A	Acetylene
Class I, Divisions 1 & 2	B	Hydrogen
Class I, Divisions 1 & 2	C	Ethylene
Class I, Divisions 1 & 2	D	Propane, methane
Class II, Divisions 1 & 2	E (Division 1 only)	Metal dusts, such as magnesium (Division 1 only)
Class II, Divisions 1 & 2	F	Carbonaceous dusts, such as carbon & charcoal
Class II, Divisions 1 & 2	G	Non-conductive dusts, such as flour, grain, wood & plastic
Class III, Divisions 1 & 2	None	Ignitible fibers/flyings, such as cotton lint, flax & rayon

NEC & IEC Zone System gas & dust groups
Area	Group	Representative materials
Zones 0, 1 & 2	IIC	Acetylene & hydrogen (equivalent to NEC Class I, Groups A and B)
Zones 0, 1 & 2	IIB+H2	Hydrogen (equivalent to NEC Class I, Group B)
Zones 0, 1 & 2	IIB	Ethylene (equivalent to NEC Class I, Group C)
Zones 0, 1 & 2	IIA	Propane (equivalent to NEC Class I, Group D)
Zones 20, 21 & 22	IIIC	Conductive dusts, such as magnesium (equivalent to NEC Class II, Group E)
Zones 20, 21 & 22	IIIB	Non-conductive dusts, such as flour, grain, wood & plastic (equivalent to NEC Class II, Groups F and G)
Zones 20, 21 & 22	IIIA	Ignitible fibers or flyings, such as cotton lint, flax & rayon (equivalent to NEC Class III)
Mines susceptible to firedamp	I (IEC only)	Methane

Group IIC is the most severe zone system gas group. Hazards in this group gas can be ignited very easily indeed. Equipment marked as suitable for Group IIC is also suitable for IIB and IIA. Equipment marked as suitable for IIB is also suitable for IIA but NOT for IIC. If equipment is marked, for example, Ex e II T4 then it is suitable for all subgroups IIA, IIB and IIC

A list must be drawn up of every explosive material that is on the refinery or chemical complex and included in the site plan of the classified areas. The above groups are formed in order of how explosive the material would be if it was ignited, with IIC being the most explosive zone system gas group and IIA being the least. The groups also indicate how much energy is required to ignite the material by energy or thermal effects, with IIA requiring the most energy and IIC the least for zone system gas groups.

=== Temperature ===
Equipment should be tested to ensure that it does not exceed 80% of the autoignition temperature of the hazardous atmosphere. Both external and internal temperatures are taken into consideration. The autoignition temperature is the lowest temperature at which the substance will ignite without an additional heat or ignition source (at atmospheric pressure). This temperature is used for classification for industry and technology applications.

The temperature classification on the electrical equipment label will be one of the following (in degree Celsius):

USA °C		International (IEC) °C	Germany °C Continuous - Short time
T1 - 450	T3A - 180	T1 - 450	G1: 360 - 400
T2 - 300	T3B - 165	T2 - 300	G2: 240 - 270
T2A - 280	T3C - 160	T3 - 200	G3: 160 - 180
T2B - 260	T4 - 135	T4 - 135	G4: 110 - 125
T2C - 230	T4A - 120	T5 - 100	G5: 80 - 90
T2D - 215	T5 - 100	T6 - 85	
T3 - 200	T6 - 85		

The above table shows that the surface temperature of a piece of electrical equipment with a temperature classification of T3 will not rise above 200 °C. The surface of a high pressure steam pipe may be above the autoignition temperature of some fuel-air mixtures.

== Equipment ==
=== General types and methods ===
Equipment can be designed or modified for safe operation in hazardous locations. The two general approaches are:

Intrinsic safety
Intrinsic safety, also called non-incendive, limits the energy present in a system, such that it is insufficient to ignite a hazardous atmosphere under any conditions. This includes both low power levels, and low stored energy. Common with instrumentation.

Explosion proof
Explosion-proof or flame-proof equipment is sealed and rugged, such that it will not ignite a hazardous atmosphere, despite any sparks or explosion within.

Several techniques of flame-proofing exist, and they are often used in combination:

- The equipment housing may be sealed to prevent entry of flammable gas or dust into the interior.
- The housing may be strong enough to contain and cool any combustion gases produced internally.
- Enclosures can be pressurized with clean air or inert gas, displacing any hazardous substance.
- Arc-producing elements can be isolated from the atmosphere, by encapsulation in resin, immersion in oil, or similar.
- Heat-producing elements can be designed to limit their maximum temperature below the autoignition temperature of the material involved.
- Controls can be fitted to detect dangerous concentrations of hazardous gas, or failure of countermeasures. Upon detection, appropriate action is automatically taken, such as removing power, or providing notification.

=== IEC 60079 ===
==== Types of protection ====
Index	Ex code	Description	Standard (IEC/CN)	Location	Use
Flame proof	d	Equipment construction is such that it can withstand an internal explosion and provide relief of the external pressure via flamegap(s) such as the labyrinth created by threaded fittings or machined flanges. The escaping (hot) gases must sufficiently cool down along the escape path that by the time they reach the outside of the enclosure not to be a source of ignition of the outside, potentially ignitable surroundings. Equipment has flameproof gaps (max 0.006" (150 μm) propane/ethylene, 0.004" (100 μm) acetylene/hydrogen)	60079-1	Zone 1 if gas group & temp. class correct	Motors, lighting, junction boxes, electronics
Increased safety	e	Equipment is very robust and components are made to a high quality	60079-7	Zone 2 or Zone 1	Motors, lighting, junction boxes
Oil filled	o	Equipment components are completely submerged in oil	60079-6	Zone 2 or Zone 1	Switchgear
Sand, powder, or quartz filled	q	Equipment components are completely covered with a layer of sand, powder or quartz	60079-5	Zone 2 or Zone 1	Electronics, telephones, chokes
Encapsulated	m	Equipment components of the equipment are usually encased in a resin type material	60079-18	Zone 1 (Ex mb) or Zone 0 (Ex ma)	Electronics (no heat)
Pressurised/purged	p	Equipment is pressurised to a positive pressure relative to the surrounding atmosphere with air or an inert gas, thus the surrounding ignitable atmosphere can not come in contact with energized parts of the apparatus. The overpressure is monitored, maintained and controlled.	60079-2	Zone 1 (px or py), or Zone 2 (pz)	Analysers, motors, control boxes, computers
Intrinsically safe	i	Any arcs or sparks in this equipment have insufficient energy (heat) to ignite a vapour. Equipment can be installed in ANY housing provided to IP54. A 'Zener Barrier', opto-isolator or galvanic unit may be used to assist with certification. A special standard for instrumentation is IEC/EN 60079–27, describing requirements for Fieldbus Intrinsically Safe Concept (FISCO) (zone 0, 1 or 2) (This special standard has been withdrawn, and has been partially replaced by: IEC/EN60079-11:2011 and IEC/EN60079-25:2010)	60079-25; 60079-11; 60079-27	'ia': Zone 0 & 'ib': Zone 1 'ic: Zone 2	Instrumentation, measurement, control
Non-incendive	n	Equipment is non-incendive or non-sparking. A special standard for instrumentation is IEC/EN 60079–27, describing requirements for Fieldbus Non-Incendive Concept (FNICO) (zone 2). (This special standard has been withdrawn, and has been partially replaced by: IEC/EN60079-11:2011 and IEC/EN60079-25:2010.)	60079-15; 60079-27	Zone 2	Motors, lighting, junction boxes, electronic equipment
Special protection	s	This method, being by definition special, has no specific rules. In effect it is any method which can be shown to have the required degree of safety in use. Much early equipment having Ex s protection was designed with encapsulation and this has now been incorporated into IEC 60079-18 [Ex m]. Ex s is a coding referenced in IEC 60079-0. The use of EPL and ATEX Category directly is an alternative for "s" marking. The IEC standard EN 60079-33 is made public and is expected to become effective soon, so that the normal Ex certification will also be possible for Ex-s	60079-33	Zone depending upon manufacturer's certification	As its certification states

The types of protection are subdivided into several sub classes, linked to EPL: ma and mb, px, py and pz, ia, ib and ic. The a subdivisions have the most stringent safety requirements, taking into account more than one independent component faults simultaneously.

Many items of EEx rated equipment will employ more than one method of protection in different components of the apparatus. These would be then labeled with each of the individual methods. For example, a socket outlet labeled EEx'de' might have a case made to EEx 'e' and switches that are made to EEx 'd'.

==== Equipment protection level (EPL) ====
In recent years also the EPL is specified for several kinds of protection. The required protection level is linked to the intended use in the zones described below:

Group	Ex risk	Zone	EPL	Minimum type of protection
I (mines)	Energized		Ma	
II (gas)	Explosive atmosphere > 1000 hrs/yr	0	Ga	ia, ma
II (gas)	Explosive atmosphere between 10 and 1000 hrs/yr	1	Gb	ib, mb, px, py, d, e, o, q, s
II (gas)	Explosive atmosphere between 1 and 10 hrs/yr	2	Gc	n, ic, pz
III (dust)	Explosive surface > 1000 hrs/yr	20	Da	ia
III (dust)	Explosive surface between 10 and 1000 hrs/yr	21	Db	ib
III (dust)	Explosive surface between 1 and 10 hrs/yr	22	Dc	ic

==== Equipment category ====
The equipment category indicates the level of protection offered by the equipment.

- Category 1 equipment may be used in zone 0, zone 1 or zone 2 areas.
- Category 2 equipment may be used in zone 1 or zone 2 areas.
- Category 3 equipment may only be used in zone 2 areas.

=== NEMA enclosure types ===
In the US, the National Electrical Manufacturers Association (NEMA) defines standards for enclosure types for a variety of applications. Some of these are specifically for hazardous locations:

NEMA Type	Definition
7	Certified and labeled for use in indoor locations rated NEC Class I, Groups A, B, C, and D
8	Certified and labeled for use in locations rated NEC Class I, Groups A, B, C, and D; both indoors and outdoors
9	Certified and labeled for use in locations rated NEC Class II, Groups E, F, or G
10	Meets the requirements of the Mine Safety and Health Administration (MSHA), 30 CFR Part 18 (1978)

== Labeling ==
All equipment certified for use in hazardous areas must be labelled to show the type and level of protection applied.

=== Europe ===
Mark for ATEX certified equipment for explosive atmospheres

In Europe, equipment certified for use in explosive atmospheres must display the CE mark and the identification number of the notified body where required under the ATEX directive. Explosion-protected equipment is additionally marked with the Ex symbol and a protection marking identifying the equipment group, category, protection concept, gas or dust group, temperature class, and equipment protection level (EPL). Complete markings may include designations such as II 2G Ex ia IIC T4 Gb.

Example marking
Mark	Meaning
II 2G Ex ia IIC T4 Gb	Group II equipment for surface industries, Category 2 gas protection, intrinsically safe protection type "ia", suitable for IIC gases including hydrogen and acetylene, Temperature Class: T4, Equipment Protection Level: Gb

Example label:

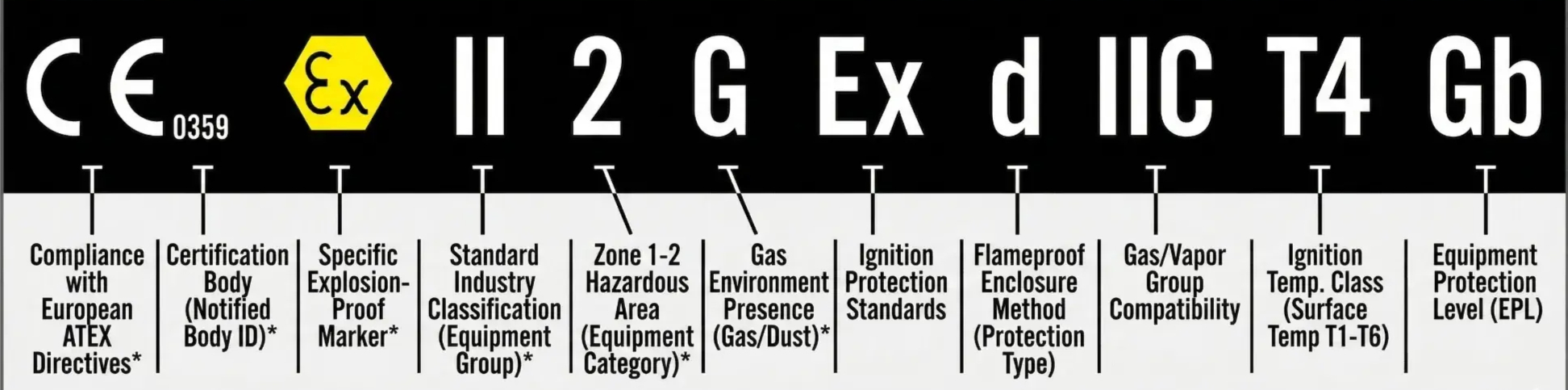
ATEX Label Decoder

Industrial electrical equipment for hazardous area has to conform to appropriate parts of standard: IEC-60079 for gas hazards, and IEC-61241 for dust hazards. In some cases, it must be certified as meeting that standard. Independent test houses—Notified Bodies—are established in most European countries, and a certificate from any of these will be accepted across the EU. In the United Kingdom, Sira and Baseefa are the most well known such bodies.

Australia and New Zealand use the same IEC-60079 standards (adopted as AS/NZS 60079), however the CE mark is not required.

=== North America ===
In North America the suitability of equipment for the specific hazardous area must be tested by a Nationally Recognized Testing Laboratory, such as UL, FM Global, CSA Group, or Intertek (ETL).

The label will always list the class, division and may list the group and temperature code. Directly adjacent on the label one will find the mark of the listing agency.

Some manufacturers claim "suitability" or "built-to" hazardous areas in their technical literature, but in effect lack the testing agency's certification and thus unacceptable for the AHJ (Authority Having Jurisdiction) to permit operation of the electrical installation/system.

All equipment in Division 1 areas must have an approval label, but certain materials, such as rigid metallic conduit, does not have a specific label indicating the Cl./Div.1 suitability and their listing as approved method of installation in the NEC serves as the permission. Some equipment in Division 2 areas do not require a specific label, such as standard 3 phase induction motors that do not contain normally arcing components.

Also included in the marking are the manufacturers name or trademark and address, the apparatus type, name and serial number, year of manufacture and any special conditions of use. The NEMA enclosure rating or IP code may also be indicated, but it is usually independent of the Classified Area suitability.

== History ==
With the advent of electric power, electricity was introduced into coal mines for signaling, illumination, and motors. This was accompanied by electrically initiated explosions of flammable gas such as fire damp (methane) and suspended coal dust.

At least two British mine explosions were attributed to an electric bell signal system. In this system, two bare wires were run along the length of a drift, and any miner desiring to signal the surface would momentarily touch the wires to each other or bridge the wires with a metal tool. The inductance of the signal bell coils, combined with breaking of contacts by exposed metal surfaces, resulted in sparks, causing an explosion.

== See also ==
- Arc flash
- ATEX directive
- CompEx competency standard
- Electrical conduit
- Grounding kit
- Intrinsic safety
- Mineral-insulated copper-clad cable
- Notified Body
- Pressure piling
