= Detonation flame arrester =

Industrial safety device

A detonation flame arrester (also spelled arrestor) is a device fitted to the opening of an enclosure or to the connecting pipe work of a system of enclosures and whose intended function is to allow flow but prevent the transmission of flame propagating at supersonic velocity.

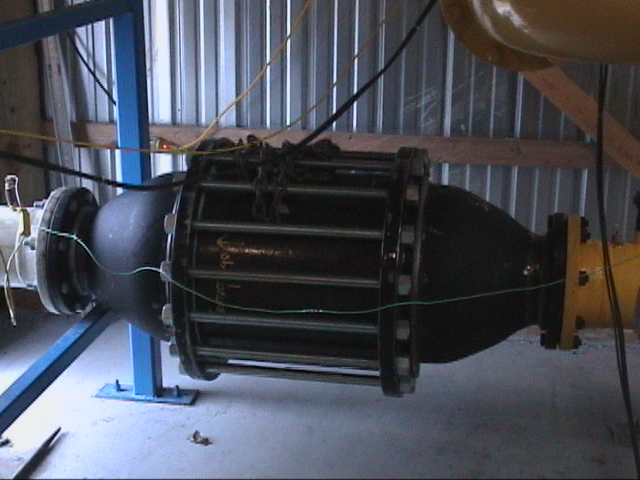
This Detonation Flame Arrester is being tested for an 8-inch piping system at Brooker Laboratory Testing Company to the USCG 33cfr154.1325 Standard.

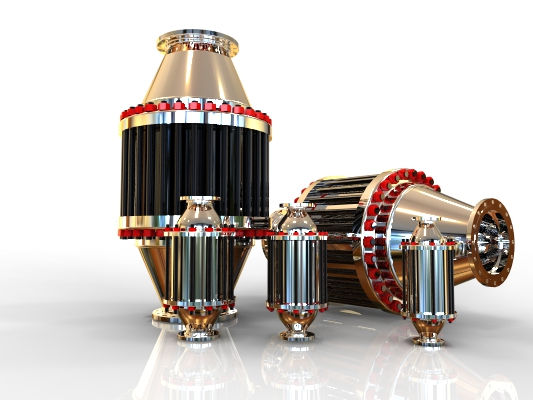
Detonation Flame Arresters for various pipe sizes from Paradox Intellectual Inc.

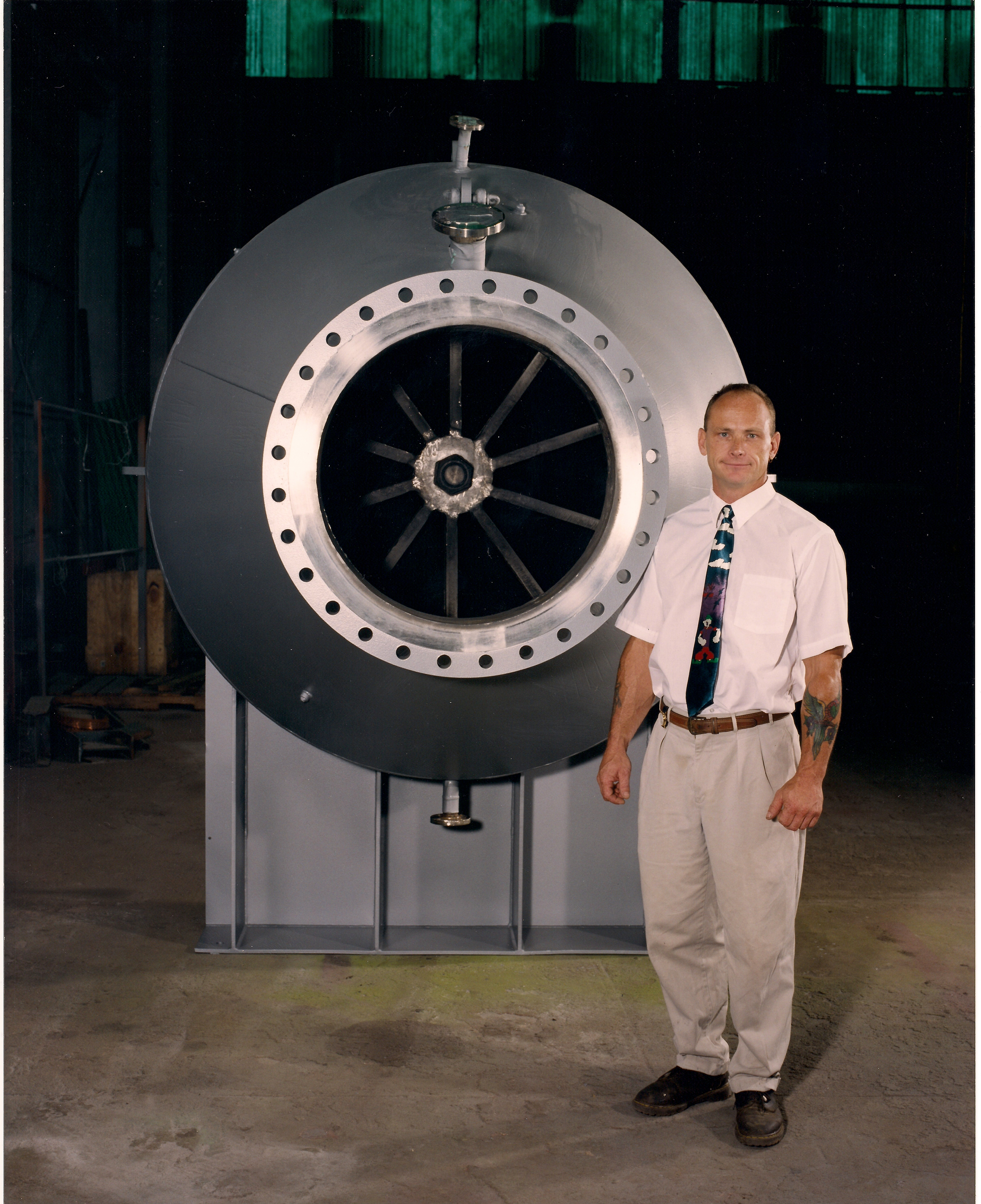
The largest detonation flame arrester ever built at the time, weighing 10 tons, for 30 inch pipe. Pictured with Dwight Brooker

Detonation Flame Arrester products were created in response to environmental regulations (such as The Clean Air Act) which required liquid product storage terminals and hydrocarbon processing plants to control evaporative hydrocarbon emissions from loading and storage operations. This process is called vapor control. Two types of recognized vapor control technologies are commonly used; carbon adsorption vapor recovery and vapor destruction or combustion. Vapor destruction systems include elevated flare systems, enclosed flare systems, burner and catalytic incineration systems, and waste gas boilers. Both systems require flame or detonation flame arresters to maximize safety. Detonation flame arresters are used in many industries, including refining, pharmaceutical, chemical, and petrochemical, pulp and paper, oil exploration and production, sewage treatment, landfills, mining, power generation, and bulk liquids transportation.

== Operation ==
Flame arresters are passive devices with no moving parts. They prevent the propagation of flame from the exposed side of the unit to the protected side by the use of metal matrix creating a tortuous path called a flame cell or element. All detonation flame arresters operate on the same principle: removing heat from the flame as it attempts to travel through narrow passages with walls of metal or other heat-conductive material, but unlike flame arresters, detonation flame arresters must be built to withstand extreme pressures that travel at supersonic velocities, 1,500 psi (10 MPa) at 2500 m/s is not uncommon with a group D Gas.

Detonation flame arresters made by most manufacturers employ layers of metal ribbons with crimped corrugations. The internal narrow passages of the crimped corrugations make up the element matrix. These passages are measured as the hydraulic diameter and are made smaller for gases having smaller maximum experimental safe gaps (MESG).

Under normal operating conditions the flame arrester permits a relatively free flow of gas or vapor through the piping system. If the mixture is ignited and the flame begins to travel back through the piping, the arrester will prohibit the flame from moving back to the gas source.

Most detonation flame arrester applications are in systems which collect gases emitted by liquids and solids. These systems, commonly used in many industries, may be called vapor control systems. The gases which are vented to atmosphere or controlled via vapor control systems are typically flammable. If the conditions are such that ignition occurs, a flame propagation inside or outside of the system could result, with the potential to do catastrophic damage.

== History ==
The first patented detonation flame arrester was developed by Nicholas Roussakis et al., U.S. patent 4,909,730 and was issued on March 20, 1990. Its need was initially driven by new environmental legislation, namely the Clean Air Act of the USA. Regular flame arresters had been around for years, but they had very limited applications.

There have been at least a dozen more since then. A few are as follows;

- U.S. patent 5,415,233 Flame arrestor apparatus
- U.S. patent 6,644,961 Flame arrestor with reflection suppressor
- U.S. patent 6,699,035 Detonation flame arrestor including a spiral wound wedge wire screen for gases having a low MESG
- U.S. patent 7,056,114 Flame arrestor with reflection suppressor

== Standards ==
- ISO 16852 - Flame arresters
- EN 12874 - Flame arresters
- USCG 33cfr154.1325 - facilities that handle, store, or transport other non‑petroleum oils
- CSA-Z343 Flame Arrester Standard

== See also ==
- Flame arrester
- Flashback arrester
