= Flame arrester =

Device that stops ignited vapor

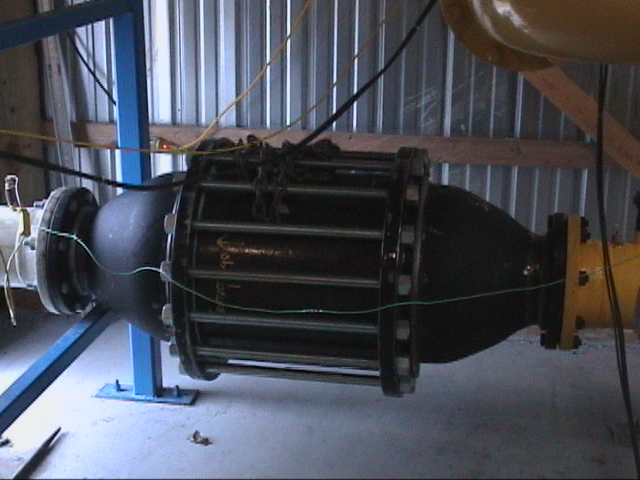
A flame arrester during testing

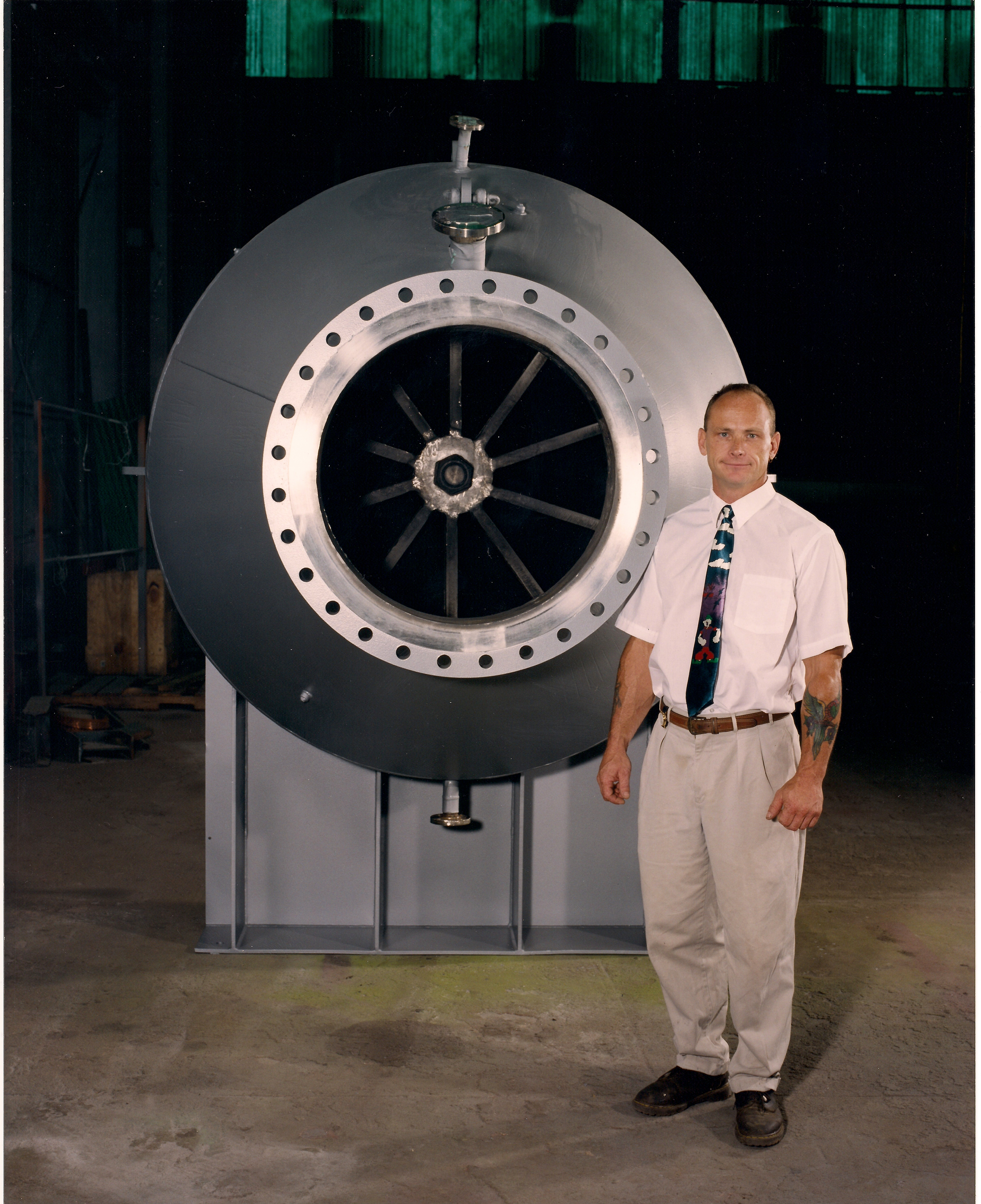
A flame arrester made for a 91 cm (36 inch) pipe weighing 10 tons

A flame arrester (also spelled arrestor), deflagration arrester, or flame trap is a device or form of construction that allows free passage of gas but will interrupt or prevent the passage of flame. It prevents the transmission of flame through a flammable gas/air mixture by quenching the flame on the high surface area provided by an array of small passages through which the flame must pass. The emerging gases are cooled enough to prevent ignition on the protected side.

== Principles ==
Flame arresters are safety devices fitted to openings of enclosures or to pipe work, and are intended to allow flow but prevent flame transmission. A flame arrester functions by absorbing the heat from a flame front thus dropping the burning gas/air mixture below its auto-ignition temperature; consequently, the flame cannot survive. The heat is absorbed through channels (passages) designed into an element. These channels are chosen and measured as the MESG (maximum experimental safe gap) of the gas for a particular installation. These passages can be regular, like crimped metal ribbon or wire mesh or a sheet metal plate with punched holes, or irregular, such as those in random packing.

The required size of the channels needed to stop the flame front can vary significantly, depending on the flammability of the fuel mixture. The large openings on a chain link fence are capable of slowing the spread of a small, slow-burning grass fire, but fast-burning grass fires will penetrate the fence unless the holes are very small. In a coal mine containing highly explosive coal dust or methane, the wire mesh of a Davy lamp must be very tightly spaced.

For flame arresters used as a safety device, the mesh must be protected from damage due to being dropped or struck by another object, and the mesh must be capable of rigidly retaining its shape during the propagation of a flame front. Any shifting of the individual wires that make up the mesh can create an opening large enough to allow the flame to penetrate and spread beyond the barrier.

On a fuel storage vent, flame arresters also serve a secondary purpose of allowing air pressure to equalize inside the tank when fuel is added or removed, while also preventing insects from flying or crawling into the vent piping and fouling the fuel in the tanks and pipes.

== Usage and applications ==
The uses of a flame arrester include:

- Installed in combustor/burner air intakes with no pipe or bends before the intake to stop confined and unconfined, low pressure deflagrations, preventing an ignited atmospheric vapor cloud from propagating beyond the Flame Arrestor, outside of a burner/flare intake.
- Prevent the spread of ignited flammable vapor within an enclosed system, such as a piping network.
- Preventing potentially explosive mixtures from propagating after ignition by lightning, static electricity or other sources in a vent to atmosphere.
- Stopping the propagation of a flame traveling at subsonic velocities

Some common objects that have flame arresters are:

- Fuel storage tank vents
- Fuel gas pipelines
- Safety storage cabinets for paint, aerosol cans, and other flammable mixtures
- The exhaust system of internal combustion engines
- The air intake of combusters, marine gasoline inboard engines and short flare stacks.
- Davy lamps in coal mining
- Overproof rum and other flammable liquors.
- Portable plastic gasoline containers

== Safety ==
Flame arresters should be used only in the gas group and conditions they have been designed and tested for. Since the depth on an arrester is specified for certain conditions, changes in the temperature, pressure, or composition of the gases entering the arrester can cause the flame spatial velocity to increase, making the design of the arrester insufficient to stop the flame front ("propagation"). The deflagration may continue downstream of the arrester.

Flame arresters should be periodically inspected to make sure they are free of dirt, insects using it as a nest, or corrosion. The U.S. Chemical Safety and Hazard Investigation Board concluded that an uninspected and badly corroded flame arrester failed to prevent a 2006 explosion at a wastewater treatment plant in Daytona Beach, Florida.

== See also ==
- Check valve – Flow control device
- Detonation arrester
- Flashback arrestor – Welding equipment
- Spark arrestor – Catcher of flammable debris
