= Sira (notified body) =

Scientific instrument research organisation in the UK

- Formation: 1918; 108 years ago
- Purpose: Research association for scientific instrumentation
- Location: South Hill, Chislehurst, United Kingdom
- Region served: Worldwide

Sira is a UK-based notified body, specialising in ATEX, IECEX and North American product approvals.

== History ==
Sira originated as the British Scientific Instrument Research Association (BSIRA), the creation of which having been stimulated by Parliament approval of a £1 million fund to support industrial research and a corresponding scheme for the establishment of research associations connected with various industries, which typically each received a grant for five years on a fifty-fifty basis towards its expenses. BSIRA was established on 30 May 1918 by a committee of the Privy Council for the promotion of scientific and industrial research and supported by the Department of Scientific and Industrial Research (DSIR). At the time of its incorporation under licence from the Board of Trade, it was only the second research association to be so incorporated, the first being the British Photographic Research Association.

The first members of BSIRA were representatives of 11 companies within the optical industry, several of which had advocated for its creation. Other early members included the electrical scientific instrument, electromedical, and X-ray industries. Its first director of research was Sir Herbert Jackson (1863–1936).

BSIRA's headquarters were originally in Russel Square, London; all activities, including its laboratories, were originally centralised at this location. Shortly after the Second World War, BSIRA relocated to a Grade II Listed former private house called 'Sitka' in South Hill, Chislehurst Furthermore, just prior to being relocated, as part of efforts to expand the organisation, BSIRA created an Information Department, which served both members and staff alike. Officially opened on 10 July 1947, a new building containing several laboratories was built at Chislehurst; three laboratories were allocated to the chemical department along with a balance room, a preparation room and storage. The physics department was provisioned with two laboratories, a dark room, and an office. Several ancillary buildings, including one containing a furnace for glass-making, were also constructed away from the main building.

By the 1960s, the association had become commonly known as 'Sira'. The services it provided were targeted towards both the operators and manufacturers of scientific instruments, particularly those that involved development work to advance the interests of the industry. By 1986, it had been organised into two operating divisions that comprised multi-disciplinary teams capable of working on various different problems, including instrument evaluation and calibration, organising conferences and courses, and the application of measurement science to resolve industrial problems.

== Administration and breakup ==
During 2005, Sira entered into administration; several of the parent company's assets, including Sira Test and Certification Ltd, Sira Defence and Security, and Sira Environmental, were subsequently acquired by Volveré plc. In July 2009, Volvere sold Sira Test and Certification Ltd, Sira Certification Service and Sira Environmental Ltd to CSA International, which it integrated as CSA Group Testing UK Limited.

== Similar organizations ==
- Baseefa — a similar organization in the UK
- Canadian Standards Association a similar organization in Canada; also serves as a competitive alternative for USA products
- ETL SEMKO — a competing testing laboratory, part of Intertek; based in London, UK
- IAPMO R&T — certification body based in Ontario, California, USA
- MET Laboratories, Inc. — testing laboratory based in Baltimore, Maryland, USA
- NTA Inc — certification agency based in Nappanee, Indiana, USA
- NCC — a similar Brazilian approvals organisation
- TÜV — a similar German approvals organisation
- Underwriters Laboratories — testing organization, based in Northbrook, Illinois, USA
- TRaC Global — a test laboratory and certification body based in the UK

== See also ==
- ANSI
- Consumers Union
- Good Housekeeping Seal
- NEMKO
- Product certification
- Quality control
- RoHS
- Safety engineering
