= CompEx =

Global certification scheme for electrical and mechanical craftspersons and designers

CompEx (meaning Competency in Ex atmospheres) is a global certification scheme for electrical and mechanical craftspersons and designers working in potentially explosive atmospheres. The scheme is operated by CompEx Certification Limited since August 2021, previously knowned as JTLimited, UK and is accredited by UKAS to ISO/IEC 17024.

The scheme was created by EEMUA (Engineering Equipment and Materials Users' Association) to satisfy the general competency requirements of BS EN 60079 (IEC 60079), parts 10, 14 and 17. The requirements are currently explicitly detailed in IEC 60079 Part 14 Annex A, detailing knowledge/skills and competency requirements for responsible persons, operatives and designers.

The scheme is broken down to twelve units covering different actions and hazardous area concepts.

In 2017, CompEx 01-04 was introduced to the NEC Standard. NEC500 & also NEC505, along with Ex "f" Foundation Courses. These are provided by Global EX Solutions, via Eaton

Unit	Title
Ex01	The preparation and installation of Ex ‘d’, ‘n’, ‘e’ and ‘p’ electrical equipment in explosive atmospheres IEC / NEC500 / NEC505
Ex02	The inspection and maintenance of Ex ‘d’, ‘n’, ‘e’ and ‘p’ electrical equipment in explosive atmospheres IEC / NEC500 / NEC505
Ex03	The preparation and installation of Ex 'i' equipment and systems in explosive atmospheres IEC / NEC500 / NEC505
Ex04	The inspection and maintenance of Ex 'i' equipment and systems in explosive atmospheres IEC / NEC500 / NEC505
Ex05	The preparation and installation of electrical equipment protected by enclosure, for use in explosive dust atmospheres
Ex06	The maintenance and inspection of electrical equipment protected by enclosure, for use in explosive dust atmospheres
Ex07	The preparation, installation and de-commissioning of electrical installations at fuel filling stations
Ex08	The inspection, test and maintenance of electrical installations at fuel filling stations
Ex09	The preparation and installation of electrical equipment in explosive atmospheres within the water industry
Ex10	The inspection, test and maintenance of electrical equipment in explosive atmospheres within the water industry
Ex11	The competency requirements for EN 13463 Parts 1, 5 and 6 for operatives working with mechanical equipment
Ex12	The competency requirements of IEC 60079 Part 14 for designers (design & selection)
Ex14	The competency requirements of IEC 60079 Parts 10, 14 & 17 for Technical Person with Executive Function (Responsible Persons duties in Explosive Atmospheres)

== See also ==
- ATEX directive
- Electrical Equipment in Hazardous Areas
