= Intrinsic safety =

Electrical safety protection technique

Directive 2014/34/EU
- European Union directive
- Text with EEA relevance
- Title: Equipment and protective systems intended for use in potentially explosive atmospheres

60079-11:2023
- EN standard
- Reference: 60079-11:2023
- Status: Current
- Title: Explosive atmospheres - Part 11: Equipment protection by intrinsic safety "i"

Intrinsic safety (IS) is a protection technique for safe operation of electrical equipment in hazardous areas by limiting the energy, electrical and thermal, available for ignition. In signal and control circuits that can operate with low currents and voltages, the intrinsic safety approach simplifies circuits and reduces installation cost over other protection methods. Areas with dangerous concentrations of flammable gases or dust are found in applications such as petrochemical refineries and mines. As a discipline, it is an application of inherent safety in instrumentation. High-power circuits such as electric motors or lighting cannot use intrinsic safety methods for protection.

Intrinsic safety devices, can be subdivided in to:

- Intrinsically safe apparatus
- Associated apparatus

== Intrinsically safe apparatus ==
Intrinsically safe apparatuses are electrical devices that have connected circuits that are intrinsically safe circuits whilst in the hazardous area.

== Associated apparatus ==
Associated apparatuses are electrical devices that have both intrinsically safe and non-intrinsically safe circuits and is designed in a way that the non-intrinsically safe circuits cannot negatively affect the intrinsically safe circuits.

== Intrinsically safe circuit ==
An intrinsically safe circuit is designed to not be capable of causing ignition of a given explosive atmosphere, by any spark or any thermal effect under normal operation and specified fault conditions.

== Operating and design principles ==
In normal use, electrical equipment often creates tiny electric arcs (internal sparks) in switches, motor brushes, connectors, and in other places. Compact electrical equipment generates heat as well, which under some circumstances can become an ignition source.

There are multiple ways to make equipment safe for use in explosive-hazardous areas. Intrinsic safety (denoted by "i" in the ATEX and IECEx Explosion Classifications) is one of several available methods for electrical equipment. see Types of protection for more info.

For handheld electronics, intrinsic safety is the only realistic method that allows a functional device to be explosion protected. A device which is termed "intrinsically safe" has been designed to be incapable of producing heat or spark sufficient to ignite an explosive atmosphere, even if the device has experienced deterioration or has been damaged.

There are several considerations in designing intrinsically safe electronics devices:

- reducing or eliminating internal sparking.
- controlling component temperatures.
- eliminating component spacing that would allow dust to short a circuit.

Elimination of spark potential within components is accomplished by limiting the available energy in any given circuit and the system as a whole.

Temperature, under certain fault conditions such as an internal short in a semiconductor device, becomes an issue as the temperature of a component can rise to a level that can ignite some explosive gasses, even in normal use.

Safeguards, such as current limiting by resistors and fuses, must be employed to ensure that in no circumstance can a component reach a temperature that could cause autoignition of a combustible atmosphere. In the highly compact electronic devices used today PCBs often have component spacing that create the possibility of an arc between components if dust or other particulate matter works into the circuitry, thus component spacing, siting and isolation become important to the design.

The primary concept behind intrinsic safety is the restriction of available electrical and thermal energy in the system so that ignition of a hazardous atmosphere (explosive gas or dust) cannot occur. This is achieved by ensuring that only low voltages and currents enter the hazardous area, and that no significant energy storage is possible.

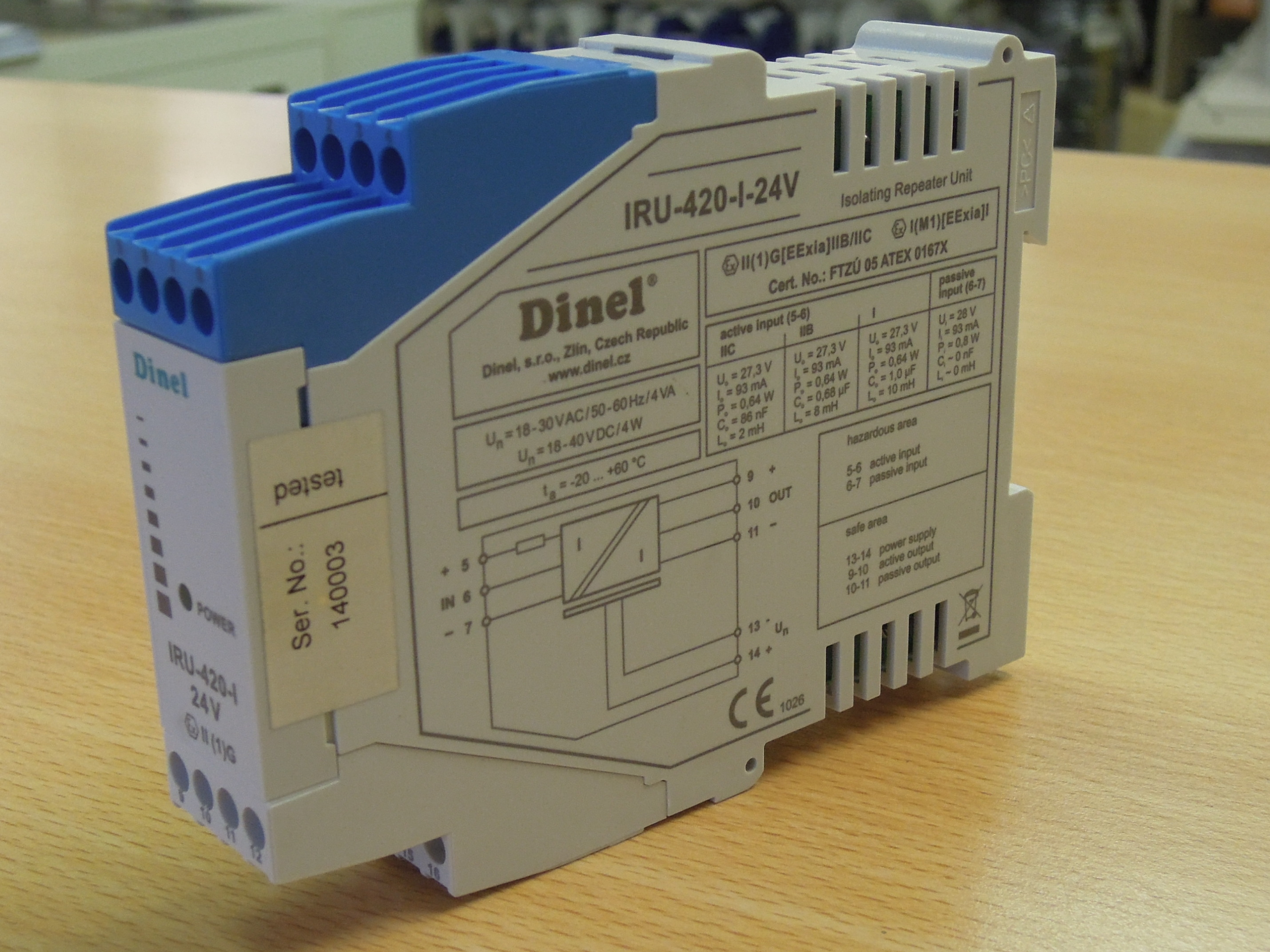
A zener barrier

One of the most common methods for protection is to limit electric current by using series resistors (using types of resistors that always fail open); and limit the voltage with multiple zener diodes. In zener barriers dangerous incoming potentials are grounded, with galvanic isolation barriers there is no direct connection between the safe- and hazardous-area circuits by interposing a layer of insulation between the two. Certification standards for intrinsic safety designs (mainly IEC 60079-11 but since 2015 also IEC TS 60079-39) generally require that the barrier do not exceed approved levels of voltage and current with specified damage to limiting components.

Equipment or instrumentation for use in a hazardous area will be designed to operate with low voltage and current, and will be designed without any large capacitors or inductors that could discharge in a spark. The instrument will be connected, using approved wiring methods, back to a control panel in a non-hazardous area that contains safety barriers. The safety barriers ensure that, in normal operation, and with the application of faults according to the equipment protection level (EPL), even if accidental contact occurs between the instrument circuit and other power sources, no more than the approved voltage and current enters the hazardous area.

For example, during marine transfer operations when flammable products are transferred between the marine terminal and tanker ships or barges, two-way radio communication needs to be constantly maintained in case the transfer needs to stop for unforeseen reasons such as a spill. The United States Coast Guard requires that the two way radio must be certified as intrinsically safe.

Another example is intrinsically safe or explosion-proof mobile phones used in explosive atmospheres, such as refineries. Intrinsically safe mobile phones must meet special battery design criteria in order to achieve UL, ATEX directive, or IECEx certification for use in explosive atmospheres.

Only properly designed battery-operated, self-contained devices can be intrinsically safe by themselves. Other field devices and wiring are intrinsically safe only when employed in a properly designed IS system. Requirements for intrinsically safe electrical systems are given in the IEC 60079 series of standards.

== Intrinsic safety compared with flameproof protection ==
It's worth noting the difference between Intrinsic Safety and flameproof or explosion-proof protection, as they're often used synonymously. Intrinsic safety (Ex i) differs from flameproof protection methods (Ex d) in the way ignition hazards are controlled. Intrinsically safe equipment is designed to prevent ignition by limiting the electrical and thermal energy available in a circuit so that sparks or heating effects cannot ignite a hazardous atmosphere, even under specified fault conditions.

Flameproof or explosion-proof equipment, by contrast, permits ignition to occur within a robust enclosure designed to withstand and contain an internal explosion without allowing flames or hot gases to propagate into the surrounding hazardous atmosphere.

Intrinsic safety is commonly used for instrumentation, sensors, communication equipment, and portable electronic devices because it allows equipment to remain operational while minimizing ignition risk. Flameproof protection is more commonly applied to higher-power equipment such as motors, lighting systems, and electrical switchgear, where limiting circuit energy is impractical.

Unlike flameproof protection methods, intrinsically safe equipment may be certified for use in Zone 0 hazardous areas where explosive atmospheres are continuously present.

== Mobile devices in hazardous areas ==
Smartphones and tablets are used in hazardous areas for field inspection, maintenance reporting, and data collection.

Two approaches exist for certifying mobile devices in classified areas. In the first, the entire device is purpose-built for hazardous area use: the circuit board, battery, display, and housing are all engineered to meet intrinsic safety requirements, and the device is certified as a complete unit under standards such as IEC 60079-11.

In the second, a certified protective enclosure (case) is used with a standard consumer smartphone such as an iPhone or Samsung Galaxy. The enclosure limits energy transfer and thermal output, and the phone-and-case combination is tested and certified together under the relevant protection concept, typically Ex ib for Zone 1 or Ex ic for Zone 2.

Both approaches require certification by a notified body (in the EU under the ATEX directive) or through the IECEx system for international markets. Testing covers maximum surface temperature under sustained device load, battery fault behavior, and electrostatic discharge characteristics of enclosure materials.

Some hazardous-area mobile devices use intrinsic safety protection methods, while others rely on certified flameproof or explosion-proof enclosures designed to contain ignition sources within the device housing.

== Certifying agencies ==
Standards for intrinsic protection are mainly developed by International Electrotechnical Commission (IEC), but different agencies also develop standards for intrinsic safety. Agencies may be run by governments or may be composed of members from insurance companies, manufacturers, and industries with an interest in safety standards. Certifying agencies allow manufacturers to affix a label or mark to identify that the equipment has been designed to the relevant product safety standards. Examples of such agencies in North America are the Factory Mutual Research Corporation, which certifies radios, Underwriters Laboratories (UL) that certifies mobile phones, and in Canada the Canadian Standards Association. In the EU the standard for intrinsic safety certification is the CENELEC standard EN 60079-11 and shall be certified according to the ATEX directive, while in other countries around the world the IEC standards are followed. To facilitate world trade, standards agencies around the world engage in harmonization activity so that intrinsically safe equipment manufactured in one country eventually might be approved for use in another without redundant, expensive testing and documentation.

== See also ==
- ATEX directive
