= Spark arrestor =

Catcher of flammable debris

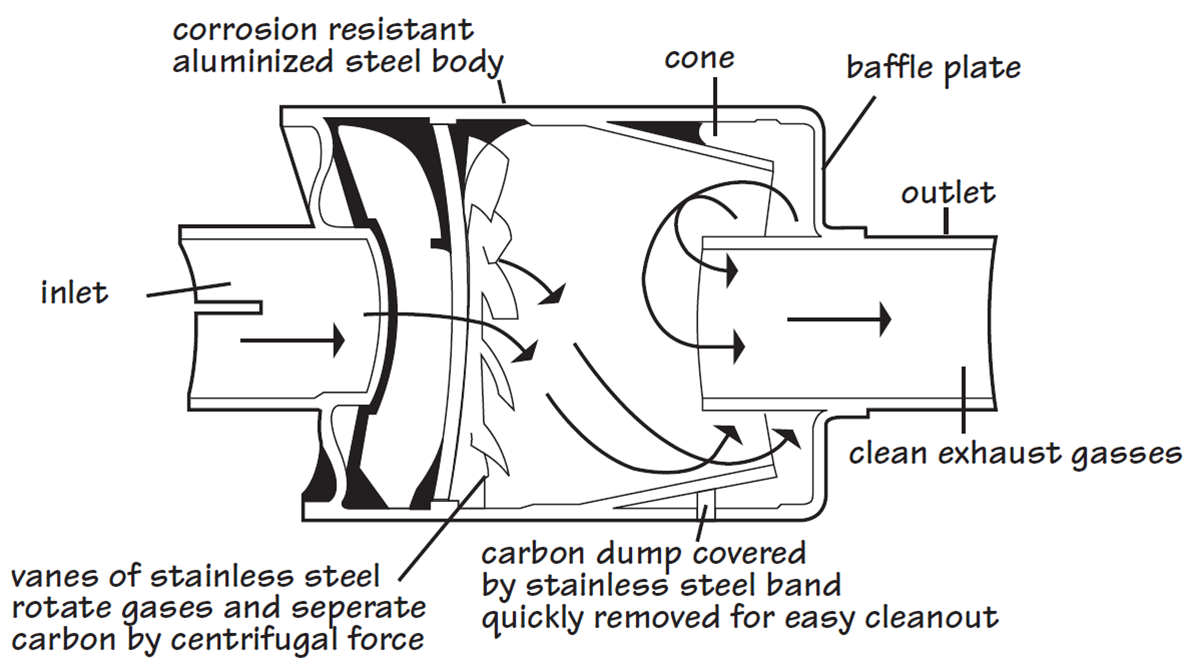
Centrifugal type spark arrester

A spark arrester (sometimes spark arrestor) is any device which prevents the emission of flammable debris from combustion sources, such as internal combustion engines, fireplaces, and wood-burning stoves.

Spark arresters play a critical role in the prevention of wildland fire and ignition of explosive atmospheres. Consequently, their use is required by law in many jurisdictions worldwide.

== Applications ==
=== Engines ===
==== Steam ====
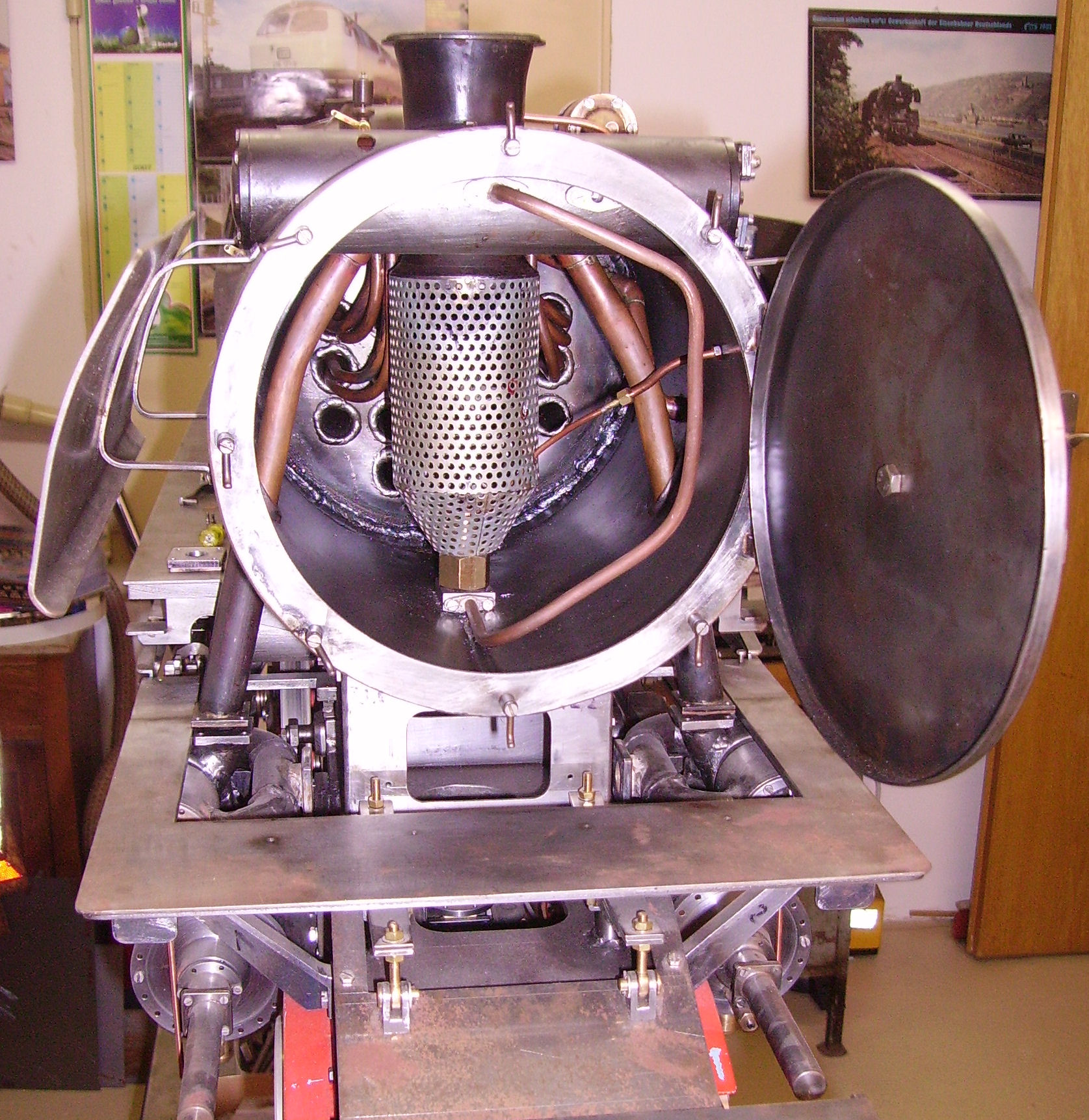
Internal spark arrester mesh on a model steam locomotive

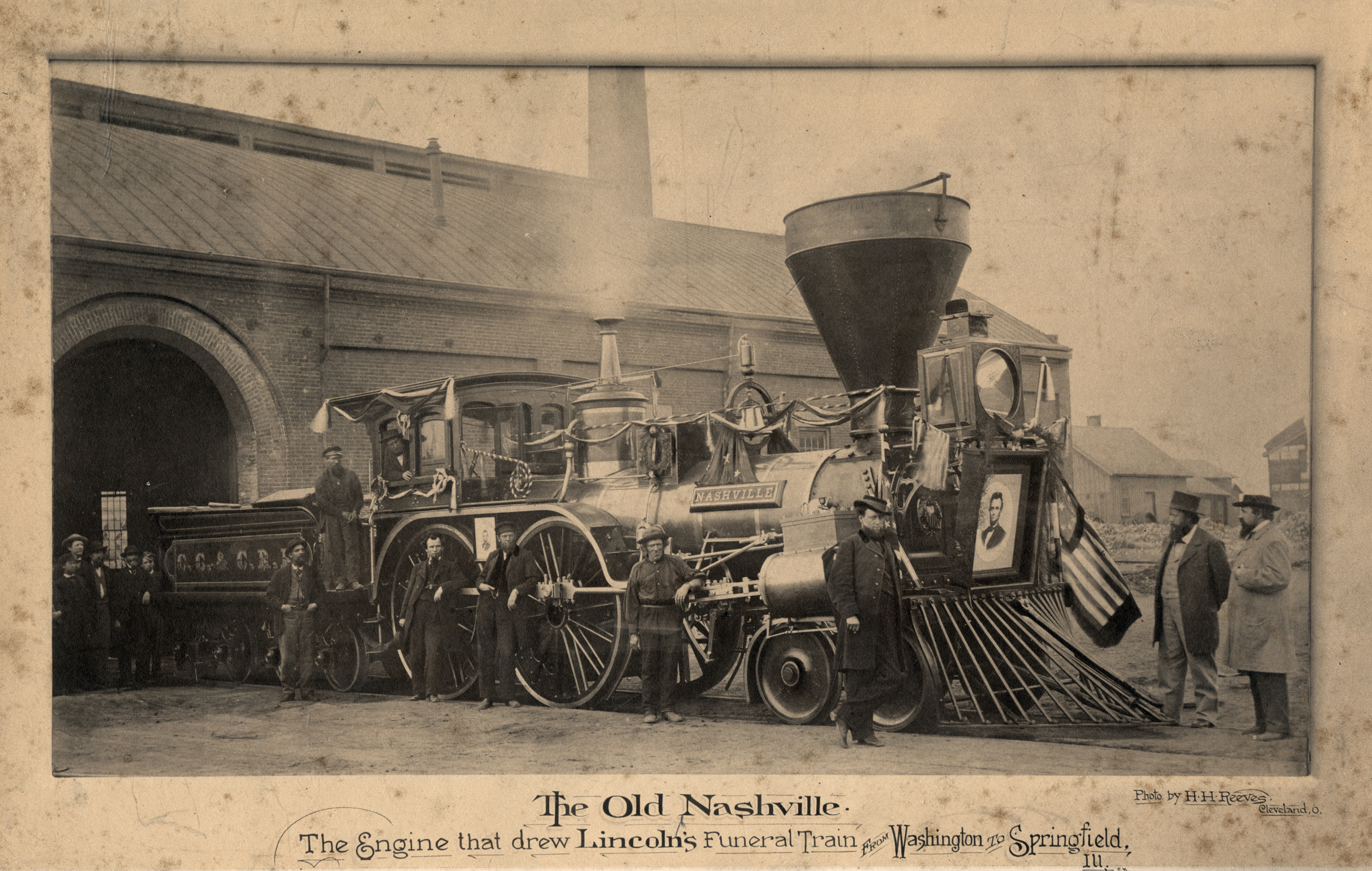
Large spark-arresting chimney on an American locomotive

Spark arresters for steam locomotives may be internal (in the form of wire mesh inside the smokebox) or external. The earliest platforms for spark arresters in the United States were steam locomotives. Wood- and coal-burning locomotives produce embers which are readily transported by the wind. One popular design was the Radley–Hunter spark arrester, which used a spiral-shaped cone to separate embers from the exhaust flow by centrifugal force.

The problem of equipment-started fires continued into the 20th century. University of California, Berkeley researchers J.P. Fairbank and Roy Bainer provided the first known academic research on the subject in 1934. Their experiments demonstrated that hot particulate matter larger than 0.023 inches (0.584 mm) in diameter was capable of igniting wildland fuels.

==== Internal combustion ====
In the 1950s, the United States Forest Service became interested in reducing the number of fires started by logging equipment in the National Forest System. This interest led to a partnership with the Society of Automotive Engineers and the development of the following test standards for spark arresters:

- SAE J335 – Multiposition Small Engine Exhaust System Fire Ignition Suppression
- SAE J342 – Spark Arrester Test Procedure for Large Size Engines
- SAE J350 – Spark Arrester Test Procedure for Medium Size Engines

Modern technologies have largely eliminated the production of large particulate matter from internal combustion engines. However, as engines wear, carbon deposits can build up on the internal walls of the engine. When these deposits break free, they exit through the exhaust system and present a potential fire hazard. Vehicles without properly functioning spark arresters have been suspected of starting numerous wildfires, including the devastating track fire near Raton, New Mexico in June 2011.

Today, spark arresters can be found as OEM or aftermarket components on many types of equipment, such as large agricultural machines, off highway vehicles (OHVs), and small engines (chainsaws, string trimmers, leaf blowers, etc.).

=== Buildings ===
Spark arresters are also fitted to the top of a flue (or a chimney pot) to prevent floating embers from a fire (particularly one burning wood) setting light to a flammable roofing surface (shingle, thatch, or bitumen-felt) or falling onto combustible material on the ground. Such a spark arrester typically consists of a double layer of metal mesh, which catches the ember and allows the flue gas to escape.

Large power station boilers are commonly fitted with electrostatic precipitators.

=== Electrical equipment ===
Vents for Purged & Pressurized Electrical Enclosures in Chemical Atmospheres (which are Hazardous Locations identified by Class, Division and Group in the NFPA National Electric Code, Article 500) must be “spark arresting”. Specifically, if a vent is utilized to prevent over-pressurization of a purged or pressurized enclosure, it must be capable of preventing the discharge of incandescent particles to the surrounding hazardous location, according to the National Fire Protection Association Standard 496. "Incandescent particles" is a new term which replaced the originally term "sparks and burning materials" in previous publications. Regardless, this term is understood and defined to be any particle that is of sufficient mass and surface temperature to ignite a surrounding flammable atmosphere. While ignition temperature of the flammable substance in question varies depending on its composition and concentration, this form of ignition source is generally seen and described by a layperson as "sparks" in the open air.

== Types ==
=== Centrifugal ===
Centrifugal type spark arresters employ stationary vanes, baffles, or other devices to trap large particles by centrifugal force. These spark arresters are typically found on heavy agricultural and construction equipment (tractors, combines, bulldozers, etc.), but some have been developed for motorcycles and other all-terrain vehicles.

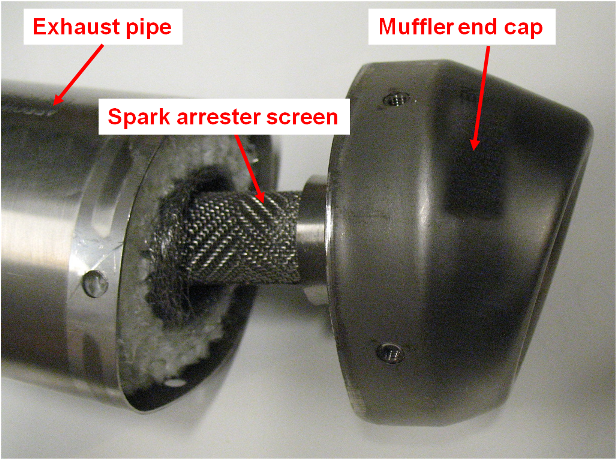
Screen type spark arrester

=== Screen ===
Screen type spark arresters use a physical mesh to prevent large particles from leaving the exhaust system. This is the simplest and most common type of spark arrester. Screen type devices are used on most motorcycles, ATVs, and small engines.

== Regulatory requirements ==
=== United States ===
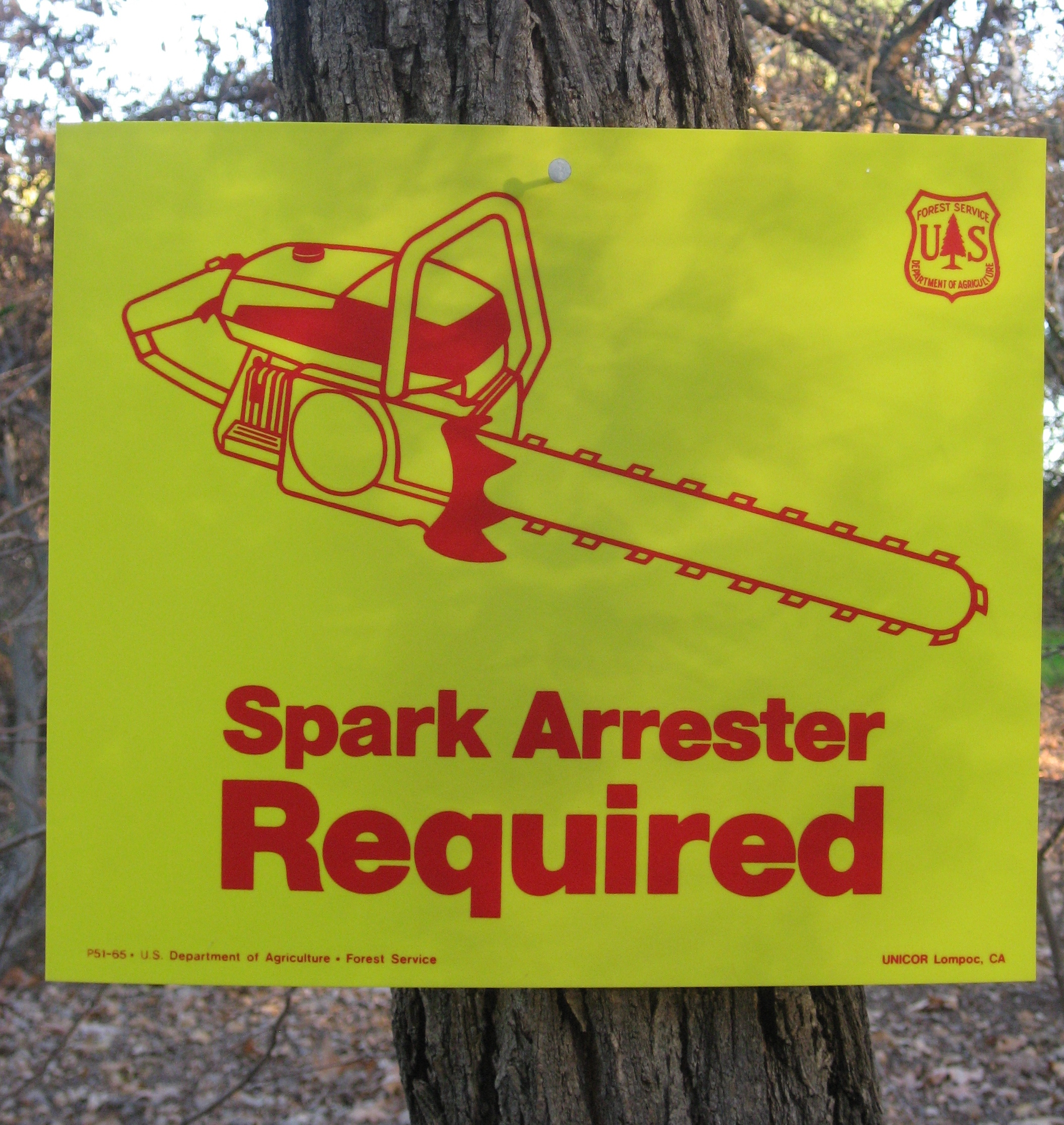
A United States Forest Service "Spark Arrester Required" sign posted in a woodcutting area

Laws governing spark arrester use in the United States depend on the jurisdiction. Internal combustion engines operating on USDA Forest Service and most other federally managed lands must meet the requirements of the Code of Federal Regulations 36 CFR 261.52. This mandate requires the operator to have a certified and properly maintained spark arrester installed at all times. Many state and local land management agencies defer to the federal requirement.

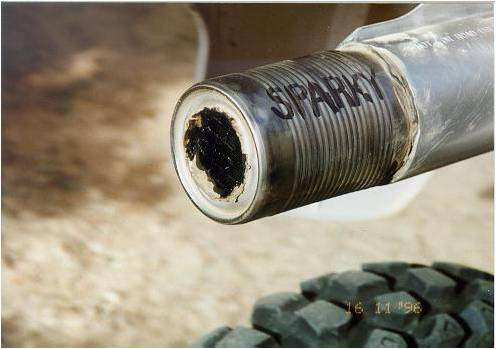
An unapproved spark arrester installed on a motorcycle

Exemptions exist for automobiles legally registered with their state's department of motor vehicles. During periods of extreme fire danger, land managers may prevent the use of all motorized equipment, even if a properly functioning spark arrester is installed. Spark arrester inspections are performed by trained agency law enforcement or fire prevention personnel. They may occur on an individual basis, or as part of an inspection checkpoint during busy recreation weekends. Operators caught using unqualified or modified devices could be cited. Penalties for violating spark arrester laws depend on the issuing agency. If it is determined a noncompliant vehicle was responsible for starting a fire, the operator could be held liable in civil or even criminal court.

Certification testing of spark arresters is performed by the USDA Forest Service Technology and Development Center in San Dimas, CA. The technical requirements are outlined in Forest Service Specification FS5100-1. All spark arresters meeting the requirements of 36 CFR 261.52 must be certified and listed in the USDA Forest Service Spark Arrester Guide. This guide is a comprehensive directory of all qualified products available in the United States, and is published biannually. The Spark Arrester Guide is used by field inspectors and consumers to verify product certification status. Manufacturers pursuing spark arrester qualification in the United States should consult the USDA Forest Service's "Manufacturer's Submission Procedure" for both general purpose and small engine spark arresters.

== See also ==
- Cyclonic separation
- Flame arrester
