= CSA Z299 =

Canadian quality assurance standards

CSA CAN3-Z299 is a series of quality assurance standards developed by the Canadian Standards Association in the 1970s. It is an alternative to the ISO 9000 series of standards. The stated objectives of the Z299 series of standards are:

(a) “To provide customers with assurance that products or services of the required quality will be supplied;
(b) For suppliers to assume responsibility for achieving the required quality and then demonstrating that it has been provided.”

== CSA CAN3-Z299 Series ==
CAN3-Z299 includes the following standards. Z299.4, .3, .2, .1 apply increasingly rigorous quality assurance activities. They were most recently reaffirmed in 2006.

=== CAN3-Z299.0-86: Guide for Selecting and Implementing the CAN3-Z299-85 Quality Assurance Program Standards ===
The Guide provides the intent of the standards, compares the four quality assurance standards available in the series, and provides guidance on selecting the appropriate standard for the product or service.

=== CAN3-Z299.4-85: Quality Assurance Program – Category 4 ===
Z299.4 is appropriate for mass-produced products designed to ordinary technical standards, or high volume services. It includes requirements to:

- Carry out inspection and testing
- Have a plan to deal with non-conforming items
- Keep records
- Control measurement and testing equipment

=== CAN3-Z299.3-85: Quality Assurance Program – Category 3 ===
Z299.3 is appropriate for products or services which involve some complex processes. Failure of the product could cause significant monetary cost or some risk to health and safety. It includes all of Z299.4 requirements, plus:

- Control of procurement activities
- Control of documentation
- Traceability of items
- Control packaging & shipping
- A manual to document these activities

=== CAN3-Z299.2-85: Quality Assurance Program – Category 2 ===
Z299.2 is for products or services requiring complex processes and technology, requiring planning in production and verification of design. Failure of the product could cause high monetary cost or significant risk to health and safety. It includes all of Z299.4 and Z299.3, plus:

- Control of manufacturing activities
- Control of handling and storage
- A plan to deal with multiple inspections and tests
- Corrective action program to prevent repetition of errors.
- Procedures to describe these activities

=== CAN3-Z299.1-85: Quality Assurance Program – Category 1 ===
Z299.1 is suitable for custom designed products or services with a high degree of technology. Failure in service could result in extremely high monetary loss or high risk to health and safety. It includes all of Z299.4, Z299.3, and Z299.2, plus:

- Control of design activities through procedures
- Independent audits on the quality assurance program

== Quality Assurance Principles of Z299 ==
Z299 covers twenty-one areas of the product or service lifecycle:

1. Tender and Contract Review
2. Design
3. Documentation
4. Measuring and Test Equipment
5. Procurement
6. Inspection and Test Plans
7. Incoming Inspection
8. In-Process Inspection
9. Final Inspection
10. Inspection Status
11. Identification and Traceability
12. Handling and Storage
13. Production
14. Special Processes
15. Packaging and Shipping
16. Quality Records
17. Nonconformance
18. Corrective Action
19. Customer Supplied Products and Services
20. Statistical Techniques
21. Quality Audits

== Comparison to ISO 9000 ==
ISO 9000 and Z299 standards have many similar requirements. One of the main differences between them is that Z299 requires Inspection and Test Plans to be submitted to the purchaser by the vendor, and independent inspection and testing. The Inspection and Test Plan details key inspections and tests at certain points in the production process, and is meant to complement a generic quality program by providing detail on the requirements of a specific product.

== See also ==
- ISO 9000 Quality management systems
- Quality management system
