= NEMA enclosure types =

Set of standard enclosures for enclosing electrical service apparatus

The National Electrical Manufacturers Association (NEMA) defines standards used in North America for various grades of electrical enclosures typically used in industrial applications. Each is rated to protect against personal access to hazardous parts, and additional type-dependent designated environmental conditions. A typical NEMA enclosure might be rated to provide protection against environmental hazards such as water, dust, oil or coolant or atmospheres containing corrosive agents such as acetylene or gasoline. A full list of NEMA enclosure types is available for download from the NEMA website.

== Enclosure types ==
Below is a list of NEMA enclosure types; these types are further defined in NEMA 250- Enclosures for Electrical Equipment. Each type specifies characteristics of an enclosure, but not, for example, a specific enclosure size. Note that higher numbers do not include the lower-numbered tests. For example, types 3, 4 and 6 are intended for outdoor use, but type 5 is not.

A NEMA enclosure rating does not mean that it also meets the same UL enclosure rating.

NFPA is National Fire Protection Association, and NEC is National Electrical Code (U.S.A.)

NEMA Type	Definition
1	General-purpose. Protects against dust, light, and indirect splashing but is not dust-tight; primarily prevents contact with live parts; used indoors and under normal atmospheric conditions.
2	Drip-tight. Similar to Type 1 but with addition of drip shields; used where condensation may be severe (as in cooling and laundry rooms).
3	Weather-resistant. Protects against falling dirt and windblown dust, against weather hazards such as rain, sleet and snow, and is undamaged by the formation of ice. Used outdoors on ship docks, in construction work, and in tunnels and subways.
3R	As 3, but omits protection against windblown dust.
3S	As 3, but also operable when laden with ice.
3X, 3RX, 3SX	X indicates additional corrosion protection; commonly used near salt water.
4 and 4X	Watertight. Must exclude at least 65 GPM of water from a 1-inch nozzle delivered from a distance not less than 10 feet for 5 min. Used outdoors on ship docks, in dairies, in wastewater treatment plants and breweries. X (as 4X) indicates additional corrosion resistance.
5	Dust-tight. Provided with gaskets or equivalent to exclude dust; used in steel mills and cement plants.
6 and 6P	Submersible. Design depends on specified conditions of pressure and time; submersible in water or oil; used in quarries, mines, and manholes.
7	Certified and labelled for use in areas with specific hazardous conditions: for indoor use in Class I, Groups A, B, C, and D environments as defined in NFPA standards such as the NEC.
8	Certified and labeled for use in areas with specific hazardous conditions: for indoor and outdoor use in locations classified as Class I, Groups A, B, C, and D as defined in NFPA standards such as the NFPA 70.
9	Certified and labelled for use in areas with specific hazardous conditions: for indoor and outdoor use in locations classified as Class II, Groups E, F, or G as defined in NFPA standards such as the NEC.
10	MSHA. Meets the requirements of the Mine Safety and Health Administration, 30 CFR Part 18 (1978).
11	General-purpose. Protects against the corrosive effects of liquids and gases. Meets drip and corrosion-resistance tests.
12 and 12K	General-purpose. Intended for indoor use, provides some protection against dust, falling dirt, and dripping non-corrosive liquids. Meets drip, dust, and rust resistance tests.
13	General-purpose. Primarily used to provide protection against dust, spraying of water and non-corrosive coolants. Meets oil exclusion and rust resistance design tests.

== See also ==
- Electrical equipment in hazardous areas
- NEMA connector – Another common, but mostly unrelated, set of standards from NEMA
- NEMA ICS 16, electrical motor flange mounting patterns defined in millimeters or inches
