= British Photographic Research Association =

Photographic research organisation in the UK

- Formation: 1918; 108 years ago
- Purpose: Research association for photography
- Region served: Worldwide

The British Photographic Research Association (BPRA) is a UK-based collaborative research and development organisation focused on the camera industry.

== History ==
The British Photographic Research Association (BPRA) was established on 15 May 1918 after several manufacturers of photographic materials and equipment declared their support for the creation of such an organisation. Its creation beneficially coincided with Parliament approval of a £1 million fund to support industrial research and a corresponding scheme for the establishment of research associations connected with various industries, which typically each received a grant for five years on a fifty-fifty basis towards its expenses. It was the first such research association to be incorporated under the scheme of the Privy Council for the promotion of scientific and industrial research. It was recognised that individual companies were too small to conduct the amount of research need to compete with large international competitors.

Initially, BPRA made use of laboratory facilities provided by the chemical department of University College in Gower Street, London. In October 1920, it transferred to the Institute of Chemistry, 30 Russell Square, London, where multiple rooms had been configured specifically for their field of research.

In September 1920, the chemist Thomas Slater Price was appointed director of research at BPRA. During the 1920s, work in its laboratories resulted in numerous published research papers.
