= Herbert Jackson (chemist) =

British chemist

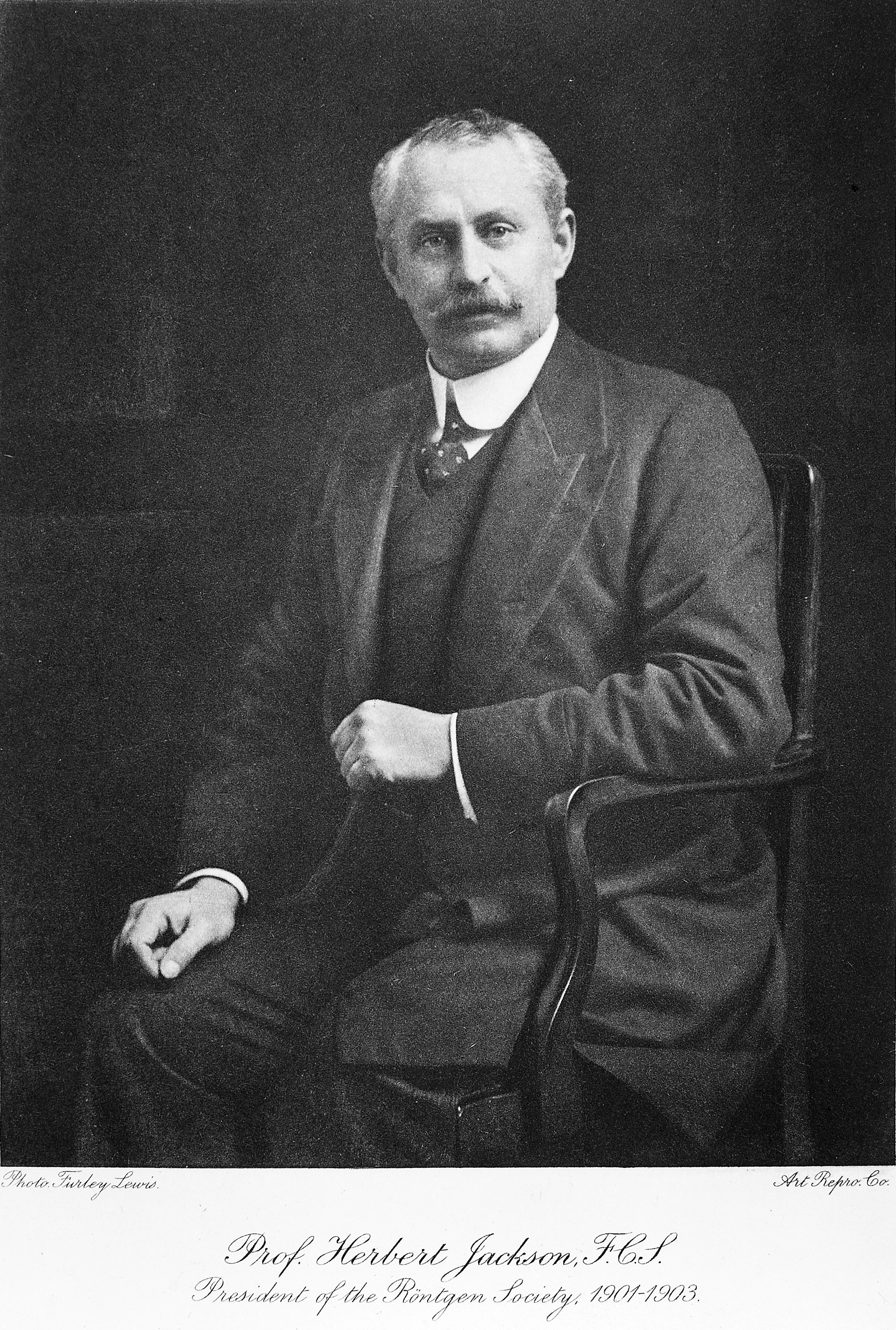
Herbert Jackson

Sir Herbert Jackson KBE, FRS (1863–1936) was a British chemist. He was knighted for his work on heat-resisting and optical glasses for military use in the First World War.

Jackson was born in Hampstead, London, on 17 March 1863. He studied at King's College, London from 1879, becoming Professor of Organic Chemistry in 1905. In 1914 he became Daniell Professor of Chemistry. During the War he worked for the Optical Munitions and Glassware Department (OMGD) of the Ministry of Munitions. In 1918 he resigned his Professorship to become the Director of Research of the British Scientific Instrument Research Association.

He died on 10 December 1936 and is buried at the parish church of Hampstead.

== Research ==
In 1896, a year after Röntgen's discovery of X-rays, Jackson demonstrated to the Royal Society an X-ray tube that became the model for all gas-type X-ray tubes.

In 1907 he presented to the Royal Society of Arts his research on detergents and bleaching agents used in the laundry industry.
