= Thomas Slater Price =

British chemist

Professor Thomas Slater Price OBE FRS FRSE
- Born: 24 August 1875; Wednesbury
- Died: 29 October 1949 (aged 74); Rotho
- Education: Mason College
- Spouse: Florence Beardmore
- Children: Leslie; Eileen; Florence Mary
- Scientific career
- Doctoral advisor: Wilhelm Ostwald

Thomas Slater Price (1875–1949) was a British chemist.

== Biography ==
Price was born on 24 August 1875 in Wednesbury, the second of nine children of Thomas Price, a teacher, and Mary Anne (née Slater). His early education was at the Wesleyan school at which his father was headmaster. From age 12 he attended King Edward's School in Birmingham, from where he gained a place at Mason College. He graduated as BSc from the University of London in 1895, with first class honours in chemistry and physics.

After graduation he undertook research at Mason College, supervised by P F Frankland. He then worked in Leipzig with Wilhelm Ostwald and was awarded his PhD summa cum laude. In 1898 he continued his work in the laboratory of Svante Arrhenius in Stockholm.

He returned to Mason College in 1898 and finished his Stockholm research, for which he was awarded a University of London DSc. After a year at Sheffield, Price moved to the University of Birmingham, as senior lecturer in chemistry. In 1903, aged 28, he was appointed head of the chemistry department at the Birmingham Central Technical College.

In 1916 Price took up secret war work at the Royal Naval Experimental Station in Stratford, with the rank of Lieutenant in the Royal Naval Volunteer Reserve. Later the number and scope of the researches expanded and he was promoted Lieutenant-Commander, in charge of them all. One of the important projects was the design and filling of special apparatus for the formation of smoke screens at sea, used with great success in the raid on Zeebrugge. Price was awarded a military OBE in 1919.

In September 1920 Price was appointed director of research at The British Photographic Association, which had been formed two years earlier. He held this position for ten years. Many important papers came from its laboratories during the ten years he was in charge; the Association closed in 1930.

In 1931 Price was appointed chair of chemistry of Heriot-Watt College, a post he held until he retired in 1940. He suffered persistent ill-health for most of this time.

Price published 36 papers in the period 1897 to 1923. The Royal Society elected him to its Fellowship in 1924, and the Royal Society of Edinburgh in 1932.

=== Family ===
Thomas Slater Price married Florence Beardmore, also born in Wednesbury, in 1904. They had three children: Leslie, Eileen and Florence Mary. Price died on 29 October 1949 at Ratho, near Edinburgh, a little over a year after his wife had died. He was cremated on 2 November. Florence was buried at Wood Green Cemetery, Wednesbury, with her parents and brother.

== Other appointments ==
The Chemical Society
Member of Council, 1921-1924
Senior Honorary Secretary, 1924-1928
Honorary Treasurer, 1928-1931
Vice-President, 1931-1934
The Royal Institute of Chemistry
Examiner in Physical Chemistry, 1907-1911
Member of Council, 1911-1914 and 1921-1924
Vice-President, 1924-1927
The Royal Photographic Society
Member of Council, 1922-1931
Vice-President, 1926-1929

== Books ==
- Theories of Chemistry
- A Course of Practical Organic Chemistry (1907)
- Peracids and Their Salts (1912)
