= ATEX directives =

EU ATEX Directive on workplaces with an explosive atmosphere

Directive 2014/34/EU
- European Union directive
- Text with EEA relevance
- Title: Equipment and protective systems intended for use in potentially explosive atmospheres

History
- Entry into force: 18 April 2014

Other legislation
- Replaces: 94/9/EC

Directive 1999/92/EC
- European Union directive
- Text with EEA relevance
- Title: Minimum requirements for improving the safety and health protection of workers potentially at risk from explosive atmospheres

The ATEX directives are two of the EU directives describing the minimum safety requirements for workplaces and equipment used in explosive atmospheres. The name is an initialization of the term ATmosphères EXplosives (French for "explosive atmospheres").

== Directives ==
Community Mark affixed on ATEX certified equipment intended for use in potentially explosive atmospheres.

Organizations in the EU must follow Directives to protect employees from explosion risk in areas with an explosive atmosphere.

There are two ATEX Directives (one for the manufacturer and one for the user of the equipment):

- The ATEX 114 "equipment" Directive 2014/34/EU - Equipment and protective systems intended for use in potentially explosive atmospheres
- The ATEX 153 "workplace" Directive 1999/92/EC - Minimum requirements for improving the safety and health protection of workers potentially at risk from explosive atmospheres.

Note: The ATEX 95 "equipment" Directive 94/9/EC, was withdrawn on 20 April 2016 when it was replaced by ATEX 114 Directive 2014/34/EU. ATEX Directive 2014/34/EU is mandatory for manufacturers as of 20 April 2016 as stated in article 44 of the Directive.

ATEX Directive 2014/34/EU was published on 29 March 2014, by the European Parliament. It refers to the harmonization of the laws of the Member States relating to equipment and protective systems intended for use in potentially explosive atmospheres.

Regarding ATEX 99/92/EC Directive, the requirement is that Employers must classify areas where potentially explosive atmospheres may occur, into zones. The classification given to a particular zone, and its size and location, depends on the likelihood of an explosive atmosphere occurring and its persistence if it does.

Equipment in use before July 2003 is allowed to be used indefinitely provided a risk assessment shows it is safe to do so.

The aim of Directive 2014/34/EU is to allow the free trade of ‘ATEX’ equipment and protective systems within the EU by removing the need for separate testing and documentation for each member state.

The regulations apply to all equipment intended for use in explosive atmospheres, whether electrical or mechanical, including protective systems. There are two categories of equipment: 'I' for mining and 'II' for surface industries. Manufacturers who apply its provisions and affix the CE marking and the Ex marking are able to sell their equipment anywhere within the European Union without any further requirements with respect to the risks covered being applied. The directive covers a large range of equipment, potentially including equipment used on fixed offshore platforms, in petrochemical plants, mines, flour mills, and other areas where a potentially explosive atmosphere may be present.

In very broad terms, there are three preconditions for the directive to apply: the equipment must (a) have its own effective source of ignition, (b) be intended for use in a potentially explosive atmosphere (air mixtures), and (c) be under normal atmospheric conditions.

The directive also covers components essential for the safe use and safety devices directly contributing to the safe use of the equipment in scope. These latter devices may be outside the potentially explosive environment.

Manufacturers/suppliers (or importers, if the manufacturers are outside the EU) must ensure that their products meet essential health and safety requirements and undergo appropriate conformity procedures. This usually involves testing and certification by a ‘third-party’ certification body (known as a Notified Body e.g. UL, Vinçotte, Intertek, Sira, Baseefa, Lloyd's, TUV ICQC) but manufacturers/suppliers can ‘self-certify’ Category 3 equipment (technical dossier including drawings, hazard analysis and users manual in the local language) and Category 2 non-electrical equipment. Still, for Category 2 the technical dossier must be lodged with a notified body. Once certified, the equipment is marked by the ‘CE’ (meaning it complies with ATEX and all other relevant directives) and the ‘Ex’ symbol to identify it as approved under the ATEX directive. The technical dossier must be kept for a period of 10 years.

Certification ensures that the equipment or protective system is fit for its intended purpose and that adequate information is supplied with it to ensure that it can be used safely. There are four ATEX classifications to ensure that a specific piece of equipment or protective system is appropriate and can be safely used in a particular application:

1. Industrial or Mining Application

2. Equipment Category

3. Atmosphere

4. Temperature

1. The ATEX as an EU directive finds its US equivalent under the HAZLOC standard. This standard given by the Occupational Safety and Health Administration defines and classifies hazardous locations such as explosive atmospheres.

== Explosive atmospheres ==
In DSEAR, an explosive atmosphere is defined as a mixture of dangerous substances under certain atmospheric conditions that are part of the air. They are in the form of gases or airborne particulates, in which, after ignition has occurred, combustion will spread to the entire mixture.

The aforementioned atmospheric conditions are temperatures of −20 to 40°C, and pressures of 0.8 to 1.1 bar.

== Zone classification ==
The ATEX Directive covers explosions from flammable gas/vapors and combustible dust/fibers (which, contrary to common belief, can lead to hazardous explosions).

The following are classifications for zones that can produce explosive atmospheres.

Gas/Vapor/Mist:

The following zones are each defined as a place in which an explosive atmosphere consisting of a mixture of air or dangerous substances in the form of gas, vapor, or mist...

- Zone 0 – ...is present continuously or for long periods or frequently.
- Zone 1 – ...is likely to occur in normal operation occasionally.
- Zone 2 – ...is not likely to occur in normal operation, and if it does occur, will persist for a short period only.

Dust/Fibers:

These are defined as a place in which an explosive atmosphere is in the form of a cloud of combustible dust in the air...

- Zone 20 – ...is present continuously, or for long periods or frequently.
- Zone 21 – ...is likely to occur in normal operation occasionally.
- Zone 22 – ...is not likely to occur in normal operation but, if it does occur, will persist for a short period only.

Effective ignition source

"Effective ignition source" is a term defined in the European ATEX directive as an event that, in combination with sufficient oxygen and fuel, can cause an explosion. Methane, hydrogen, and coal dust are good examples of possible fuels.

Effective ignition sources are:

- Lightning strikes
- Stray currents
- Static electricity
- Some frequencies of electromagnetic waves (Light waves)
- Ultrasound (Sound waves above the human hearing range, generally above 20 kHz)
- Electrical switches (Toggling an electrical switch (particularly turning it off) can cause arcing inside the switch)
- Open flames (This may range from a lit cigarette to welding activity)
- Hot gasses (This can include a gas that just has hot particulates in it)
- Mechanically generated impact spark (For example, a hammer blow on a rusty steel surface compared to a hammer blow on a flint stone. The speed and impact angle (between surface and hammer) are important; a 90-degree blow on a surface is relatively harmless)
- Mechanically generated friction sparks (The combination of materials and speed determine the effectiveness of the ignition source. For example, 4.5 m/s steel-steel friction with a force greater than 2 kN is an effective ignition source. The combination of aluminum and rust is also notoriously dangerous. More than one red hot spark is often necessary in order to have an effective ignition source)
- Electric sparks (For example, a bad electrical connection or a faulty pressure transmitter)
- Electrostatic discharge (Static electricity can be generated by air sliding over a wing, or a non-conductive liquid flowing through a filter screen)
- Ionizing radiation
- Hot surfaces
- Exothermic reactions (A chemical reaction that expels heat from the involved substances, into the surrounding area)
- Adiabatic compression (When air is pushed through a narrow passage quickly, causing the passage's surface to heat up)

Gasgroup	Hazardous Substance
IIA	Acetic Acid, Acetone, Ammonia, Butane, Cyclohexane, Propane, Gasoline (petrol), Diesel, Methane (natural gas, non-mining), Toluene, Xylene, Methanol (methyl alcohol), Propane-2-ol (iso-propyl alcohol)
IIB	Di-ethyl ether, Ethylene, Ethanol, Methyl ethyl ketone (MEK), Propane-1-ol (n-propyl alcohol)
IIC	Acetylene, Hydrogen

== Implementation ==
Dangerous Substances and Explosive Atmospheres Regulations 2002
- Statutory Instrument
- Parliament of the United Kingdom
- Citation: SI 2002/2776

Dates
- Made: 7 November 2002
- Laid before Parliament: 15 November 2002
- Commencement: 9 December 2002
Other legislation
Made under	Health and Safety at Work etc. Act 1974

Text of statute as originally enacted

Text of the Dangerous Substances and Explosive Atmospheres Regulations 2002 as in force today (including any amendments) within the United Kingdom, from legislation.gov.uk.

The Dangerous Substances and Explosive Atmospheres Regulations 2002 (SI 2002/2776), or DSEAR, is the United Kingdom's implementation of the ATEX directive. The intention of the Regulations is to reduce the risk of a fatality or serious injury resulting from a "dangerous substance" igniting and potentially exploding. Examples of a "dangerous substance", as defined by DSEAR, include sawdust, ethanol vapours, and hydrogen gas. The regulation is enforceable by the HSE or local authorities.

From June 2015, DSEAR incorporated changes in the EU Chemical Agents Directive and now also covers gases under pressure and substances that are corrosive to metals.

== See also ==
- Area classification
- Electrical equipment in hazardous areas
- Intrinsic safety
- HSEQ
