= CSA Group =

Canadian standards development organisation

- Abbreviation: CSA
- Formation: 1919
- Purpose: Standards organization
- Headquarters: 178 Rexdale Blvd. Toronto, ON; M9W 1R3
- Coordinates: 43°42′44.56″N 79°34′19.03″W
- Region served: Canada, United States, Asia, Europe
- President & CEO: David Weinstein
- Website: www.csagroup.org

The CSA Group, formerly known as the Canadian Standards Association (CSA), is a standards organization which develops standards in 57 areas. CSA publishes standards in print and electronic form, and provides training and advisory services. CSA is composed of representatives from industry, government, and consumer groups.

CSA began as the Canadian Engineering Standards Association (CESA) in 1919, federally chartered to create standards. During World War I, lack of interoperability between technical resources led to the formation of a standards committee.

CSA is accredited by the Standards Council of Canada, a crown corporation which promotes voluntary standardization in Canada. This accreditation verifies that CSA is competent to carry out standards development and certification functions, and is based on internationally recognised criteria and procedures.

The CSA registered mark shows that a product has been independently tested and certified to meet recognized standards for safety or performance.

== History ==
During World War I, lack of interoperability between technical resources led to frustration, injury, and death. Britain requested that Canada form a standards committee.

Sir John Kennedy, as chairman of the Civil Engineers' Canadian Advisory Committee, led the investigation into the necessity of an independent Canadian standards organization. As a result, the Canadian Engineering Standards Association (CESA) was established in 1919. CESA was federally chartered to create standards. At the beginning, they attended to specific needs: aircraft parts, bridges, building construction, electrical work, and wire rope. The first standards issued by CESA were for steel railway bridges, in 1920.

The CSA certification mark

In 1927, CESA published the Canadian Electrical Code. Enforcing the code called for product testing, and in 1933, the Hydro-Electric Power Commission of Ontario became the sole source for testing nationwide. In 1940, CESA assumed responsibility for testing and certifying electrical products intended for sale and installation in Canada. CESA was renamed the Canadian Standards Association (CSA) in 1944. The certification mark was introduced in 1946.

Known in the French-language as Association canadienne de normalisation, CSA used the French-language acronym of ACNOR. The initialism "CSA" is now used in both official languages.

In the 1950s, CSA established international alliances in Britain, Japan, and the Netherlands, to expand its scope in testing and certification. Testing labs were expanded from their first in Toronto, to labs in Montreal, Vancouver, and Winnipeg.

In the 1960s, CSA developed national occupational health and safety standards, creating standards for headgear and safety shoes. By the late 1960s and early 1970s, the CSA began to expand its involvement in consumer standards, including bicycles, credit cards, and child resistant packaging for drugs.

Tom Pashby became chairman of the CSA in 1975, serving for two decades to set standards for manufacturers of ice hockey helmets and lacrosse helmets.

In 1984, CSA established QMI, the Quality Management Institute for registration of ISO9000 and other standards. In 1999, CSA International was established to provide international product testing and certification services while CSA shifted its primary focus to standards development and training. In 2001, these three divisions were joined under the name CSA Group. In 2004, OnSpeX was launched as the fourth division of CSA Group. In 2008, QMI was sold to SAI-Global for $40 million.

In 2009, CSA purchased SIRA.

== Standards development ==
CSA exists to develop standards. Among the fifty-seven different areas of specialization are business management and safety and performance standards, including those for electrical and electronic equipment, industrial equipment, boilers and pressure vessels, compressed gas handling appliances, environmental protection, and construction materials.

Most standards are voluntary, meaning there are no laws requiring their application. Despite that, adherence to standards is beneficial to companies because it shows products have been independently tested to meet certain standards. The CSA mark is a registered certification mark, and can only be applied by someone who is licensed or otherwise authorised to do so by the CSA.

CSA developed the CAN/CSA Z299 series, now called N299, of quality assurance standards, which are still in use today. They are an alternative to the ISO 9001 quality management standard, specific to companies supplying goods to nuclear power plants. Currently forty percent of all the standards issued by CSA are referenced in Canadian legislation.

CSA has developed many relevant standards in the electrical field, including the Canadian Electrical Code (CEC). CSA C22.2 standard for Rigid Types EB1 and DB2/ES2 conduit, ENT tubing, to clarify and unify the installation specifications for cables and electrical conduits and to regulate the manufacturing, performance, and marking of PVC conduits.

Laws in many jurisdictions in North America require that certain products be tested for standards compliance by a body officially recognized for that purpose. CSA Group is accredited to do so in a variety of areas by the SCC in Canada and OSHA in the United States (as a Nationally Recognized Testing Laboratory).
