= Flashback arrestor =

Welding equipment

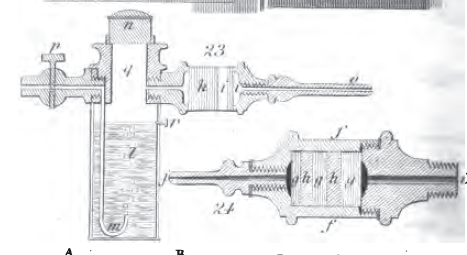
Nineteenth century examples of dry and wet types of flashback arrestors, for use with oxy-hydrogen.

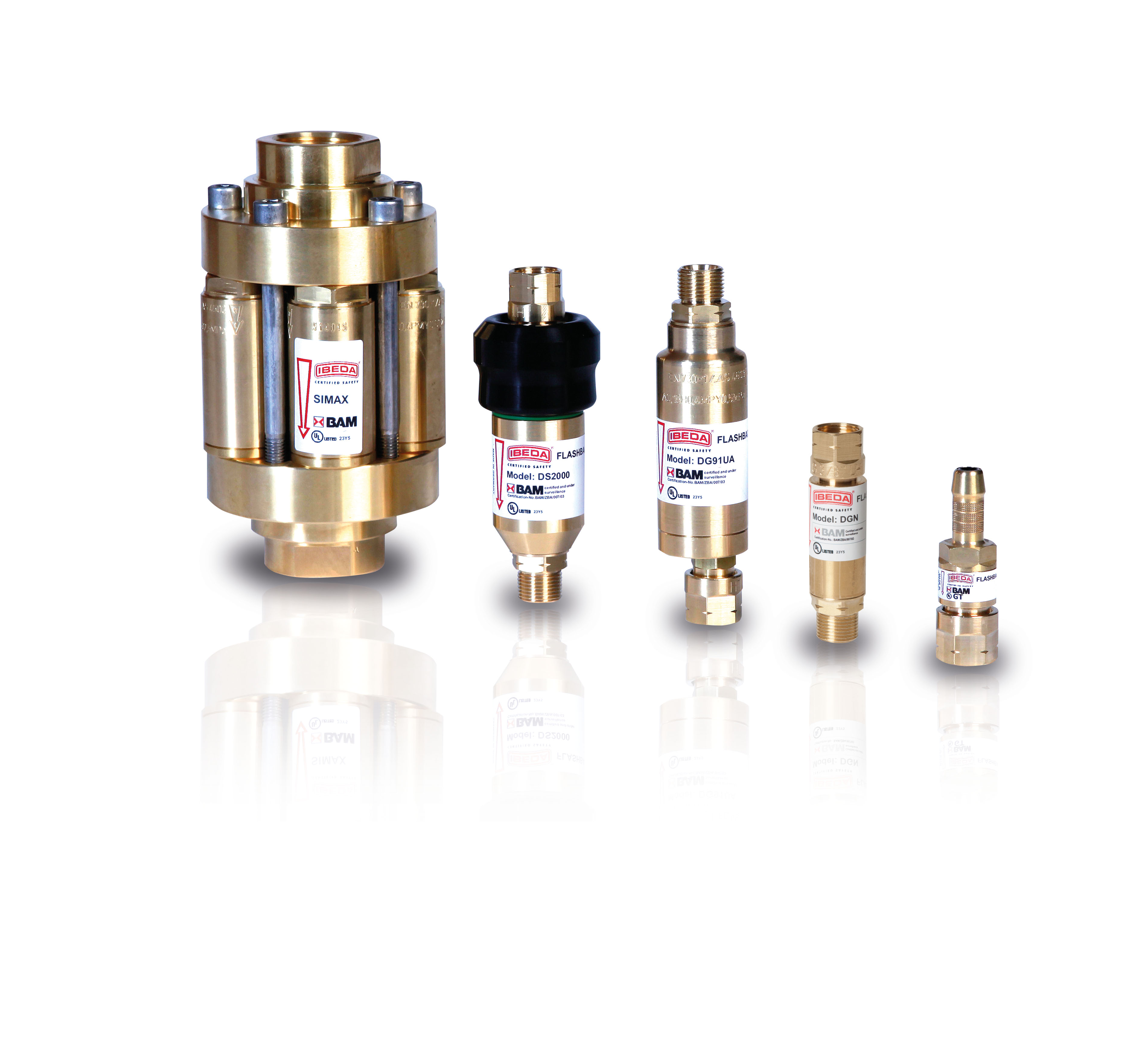
Flashback arrestors with different size and flow rate, and different connections

A flashback arrestor or flash arrestor is a gas safety device most commonly used in oxy-fuel welding and cutting to stop the flame or reverse flow of gas back up into the equipment or supply line. It protects the user and equipment from damage or explosions. These devices are mainly used in industrial processes where oxy-fuel gas mixtures are handled and used. Flashback arrestors as safety products are essential to secure the workplaces and working environment. In former times wet flashback arrestors were also used. Today the industry standard is to use dry flashback arrestors with at least two safety elements.

== Dry type ==
Dry flashback arrestors typically use a combination of safety elements to stop a flashback or reverse flow of gas. This type is typically found in cutting and welding applications all over the world. They work equally effectively in all orientations, and need very little maintenance.

The simplest flashback arrestor consists of a metallic tube filled with iron wool, which cools the flame below the ignition temperature.

In many countries or regions they are mandatory to be installed at the gas regulator or gas outlet/ tapping point. Depending on the application they are also often used at the torch side as an additional safety device.

Flashback arrestors help prevent:

- Further gas flow in the case of pressure shocks.
- The entry of air or oxygen into the distribution line or single cylinders.
- Flashbacks which are the rapid propagation of a flame down the hose.
- Further gas flow in the event of a burnback.

According to the standard DIN EN ISO 5175-1 (formerly EN 730-1) they include a minimum of two safety elements:

A gas non-return valve (NV), which:

- prevents dangerous gas mixtures.
- ensures the gas only flows in the intended direction.

and a flame arrestor (FA), which:

- cools the flame to below the ignition temperature of the gas or gas mixture.
- prevents flashback.

In addition to these two basic safety functions a flashback arrestor can also have a:

Thermal cut-off valve (TV), which:

- prevents excessive temperatures.
- closes automatically at a certain temperature and cuts off the gas flow long before the ignition temperature of the gas mixture is reached.

and a pressure-sensitive gas cut-off valve (PV), which stops the gas flow in the event of pressure shocks

The flashback arrestors are suitable for most technical gases (fuel gases) such as acetylene, hydrogen, methane, propane, propylene and butane as well as oxygen and compressed air.

Flashback arrestors have to be tested for gas non-return, for tightness and for gas flow by a qualified person depending on the country specific regulations.

== Wet type ==
Liquid seal flame arrestors are liquid barriers following the principle of a siphon where the liquid stops the entering deflagration and/or detonation and extinguishes the flame, they work by bubbling the gas through a non-flammable and ideally non-gas-absorbing liquid, which is typically water. They stop the flame by preventing it from reaching the submerged intake.

These devices are normally very effective at stopping flashbacks from reaching the protected side of the system. They have the disadvantages of only working in one orientation and tend to be much larger than dry type arrestors. This makes them mainly only suitable for large or fixed installations and the liquid level needs to be constantly checked.

On smaller units having a pressure release valve to prevent the unit from bursting under a severe flashback, the fluid level should be monitored to keep it always above the intake and not so high that the liquid could splash or overflow into the outlet.
