= Maximum experimental safe gap =

Safety measure for flammable gases

Maximum experimental safe gap (MESG) is a standardized measurement of how easily a gas flame will pass through a narrow gap bordered by heat-absorbing metal. MESG is used to classify flammable gases for the design and/or selection of electrical equipment in hazardous areas, and flame arrestor devices. The National Electrical Code classifies Class I hazardous locations into different groups depending on the respective MESG's of gases in the area.

== Examples ==
NEC Class I Group and Gas MESG
NEC Class I Group	Gas MESG	Example Gas
Group A	0.25 mm	Acetylene
Group B	≤0.45 mm (Except acetylene)	Hydrogen
Group C	0.45 mm < x ≤ 0.75 mm	Ethylene
Group D	> 0.75 mm	Propane
