= Shattered Horizon =

2009 video game

- Developer: Futuremark Games Studio
- Publisher: Futuremark Games Studio
- Composer: Markus "Captain" Kaarlonen
- Engine: 3DMark Vantage (heavily modified)
- Platform: Microsoft Windows
- Release: November 4, 2009
- Genres: First-person shooter, tactical shooter
- Modes: Single-player, multiplayer

Shattered Horizon is a 2009 first-person shooter video game developed and published by Futuremark Games Studio. The game was released on November 4, 2009, exclusively on Microsoft Windows via Steam.

== Gameplay ==
Shattered Horizon is a first-person shooter where players fight in zero gravity surrounded by the broken remains of Earth's orbital infrastructure and billions of tons of rocky debris thrown into orbit by a huge explosion on the Moon.

In Shattered Horizon, players have complete freedom of movement. They can make full use of the space setting and zero gravity to set up tactics and strategies that would be impossible in games constrained by gravity.

=== Maps ===
There are currently eight maps provided with Shattered Horizon, four from after the game's release with the Moonrise content pack. These maps are diverse, ranging from the damaged ISS (ISS), to a mining station on an asteroid (Moondust), to a two-faced asteroid harboring an abandoned research station (Flipside), to a sector of the Arc (The Arc). Each map is playable in either the assault, battle, or skirmish mode.

The game's designer states that without gravity players will experience gameplay that is both familiar to fans of the FPS style and yet different from any game they have played before.

== Plot ==
Shattered Horizon is set in 2049. Man is back on the Moon and the companies that took him there are reaping huge profits. Their greed soon leads to the largest mining accident in history. A catastrophic explosion throws billions of tons of rocky debris into near-Earth space, its aftershocks threatening to tear apart the Moon itself.

Fragments of the Moon settle around the Earth and become known as the Arc, named after the dramatic shape they draw across the night sky. With Earth surrounded by debris, there is little chance of rescue or return for the thousands of people stranded in space.

The International Space Agency's (ISA) astronauts and scientists trapped in the battered International Space Station are given the task of apprehending those responsible for the catastrophe. Weapons are among the last supplies sent to the station before the supply route from Earth is cut. The Moon Mining Cooperative (MMC) finds itself facing serious charges after only barely surviving the cataclysm. Cut off from Earth, they see the ISA as a threat to their very existence.

The two sides are drawn into an armed conflict. Desperate battles are fought over strategic locations and the scant supplies from Earth that make it through the shroud of debris. Control of the Arc now means the difference between survival and death in the cold of space.

== Development and release ==
Shattered Horizon is Futuremark Games Studio's first title. The studio was founded in January 2008 by a company known for its PC benchmarking tools 3DMark and PCMark. The development is self-funded.

The developers of Shattered Horizon have stated in interviews that their goal was to "make something that hasn't really been done" and that entering into game development was discussed within the company for long before it was publicly announced.

The game was first shown to press at Games Convention 2008 in Leipzig. GameSpot's first look preview notes that the game has "a really great premise" and that the gameplay "promises to benefit" from said premise. A more advanced build was shown to press at Gamescom 2009, where GameSpot found that "Shattered Horizon is an intriguing online shooter that seems poised to grab attention" and that "the controls in Shattered Horizon are remarkably easy to grasp".

Eurogamer's hands-on preview from the game's closed beta test reported that "Shattered Horizon is intuitively playable and immediately comprehensible". The preview notes an attention to detail and the developer's intent to make the setting true to real space, and concludes that "assuming Futuremark can sustain its developmental momentum, this will be one shooter that should be able to reach a stable orbit around the homeworld of gaming interest."

Play Magazine published a detailed preview of the game that praised the game's graphics and ambitious game design: "the lofty goal of representing FPS combat in realistic zero gravity environments has been achieved". The preview made special mention of the game's setting and back story, concluding with a challenge to the developer, "Let's build a franchise".

In March 2011, the Last Stand pack was made available as downloadable content. This expansion adds in single player and online co-op, as well as a new game mode.

In August 2014, the game was removed from the Steam store, due to a lack of time from Futuremark, two years after the company was bought by Rovio Entertainment, however, you can still use keys bought from resellers to download and play the game from Steam.

== Reception ==
Reception

Aggregate score
Aggregator	Score
Metacritic	72/100

Review scores
Publication	Score
Eurogamer	6/10
GameSpot	7.5/10

At Metacritic, which assigns a rating out of 100 to reviews from selected critics, Shattered Horizon has received a score of 72/100 which indicates "mixed or average reviews".

GameSpot rated Shattered Horizon 7.5/10, praising the handling of zero-gravity movement, atmospheric environments and the unique and deep combat mechanics, but citing the system requirements (particularly the requirement of DirectX 10) and the lack of single player game modes, levels and tutorial or bot support as its major setbacks.

Post-launch, developer Futuremark Games Studio addressed some of the common criticisms by releasing several free updates to the game. The Moonrise map pack released February 16, 2010 added four new levels, the Firepower weapons pack released May 5, 2010 introduced new weapons and grenades and the Last Stand pack released March 17, 2011 introduced single player options with bots and a new game mode.

== Delisting ==
Shattered Horizon was delisted on August 27, 2014. The developer posted a comment on the Steam Community page stating that the company would be focusing entirely on benchmarking software and would no longer be supporting the game.
