= UL (safety organization) =

Global safety certification company

UL Solutions Inc.

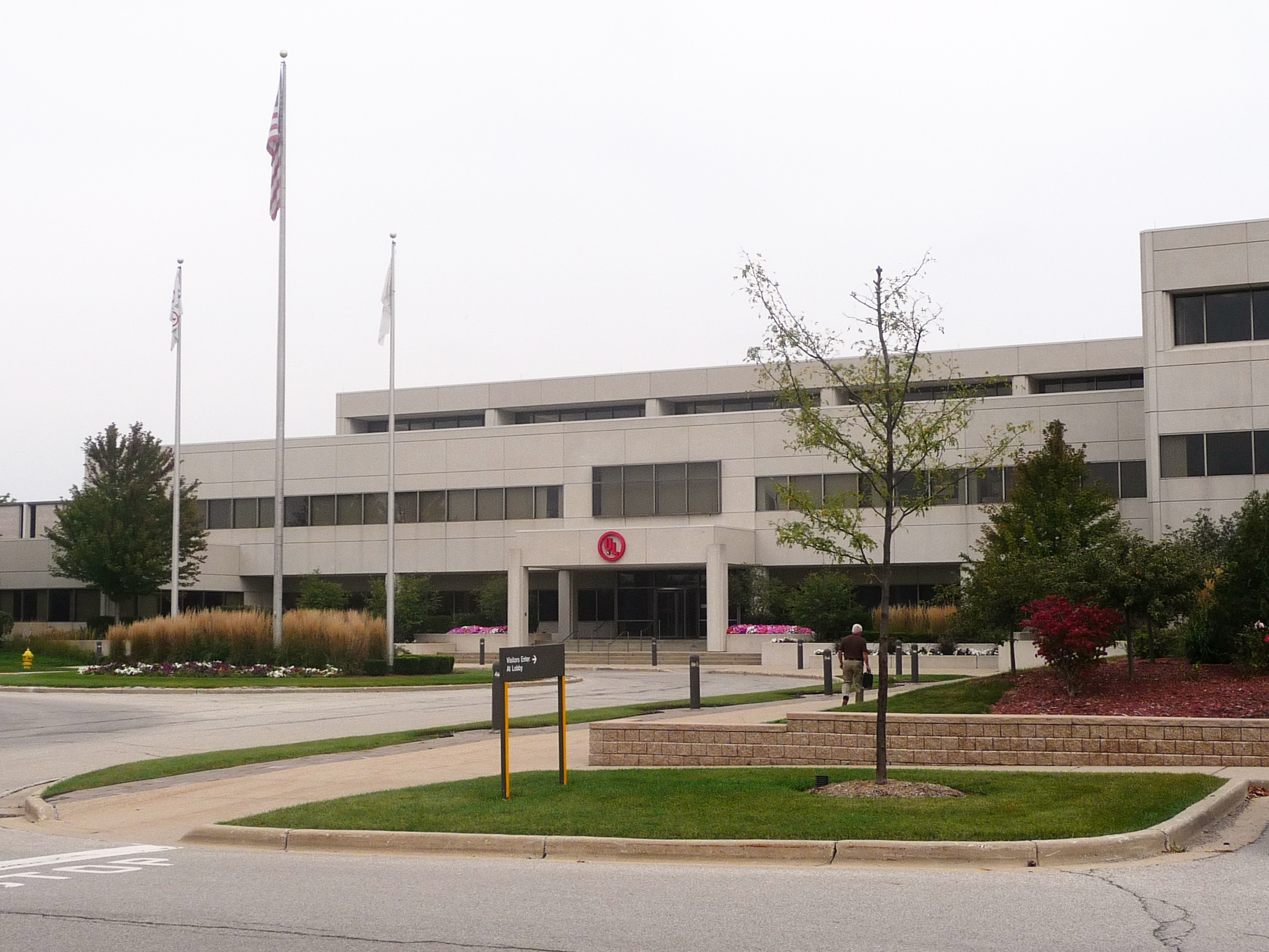
- UL headquarters in Northbrook, Illinois
- Formerly: Underwriters Laboratories, UL LLC
- Type: Public
- Traded as: NYSE: ULS; S&P 400 component
- Founded: 1894; 132 years ago in Chicago
- Founder: William Henry Merrill
- Headquarters: Northbrook, Illinois, U.S.
- Area served: 125 countries
- Key people: Jennifer Scanlon (President and CEO)
- Revenue: ▲US$2.68 billion (2023)
- Net income: ▼US$276 million (2023)
- Number of employees: 15,000+ (2024)
- Parent: Underwriters Laboratories Inc. (non-profit)
- Subsidiaries: Futuremark
- Website: www.ul.com

UL Research Institutes is a global private safety company headquartered in Northbrook, Illinois, composed of three organizations, UL Research Institutes (parent non-profit), UL Standards & Engagement (subsidiary non-profit) and UL Solutions (for-profit business controlled by the non-profits).

Established in 1894, the UL enterprise was founded as the Underwriters' Electrical Bureau (a bureau of the National Board of Fire Underwriters), and was known throughout the 20th century as Underwriters Laboratories. On January 1, 2012, Underwriters Laboratories became the parent company of a for-profit company in the U.S. named UL LLC, a limited liability company, which took over the product testing and certification business. On June 26, 2022, the companies rebranded into three distinct organizations that make up the UL enterprise.

The company is one of several companies approved to perform safety testing by the U.S. federal agency Occupational Safety and Health Administration (OSHA). OSHA maintains a list of approved testing laboratories, which are known as Nationally Recognized Testing Laboratories.

== History ==
Underwriters Laboratories Inc. was founded in 1894 by William Henry Merrill. After graduating from the Massachusetts Institute of Technology (MIT) with a degree in electrical engineering in 1889, Merrill went to work as an electrical inspector for the Boston Board of Fire Underwriters. At the turn of the twentieth century, fire loss was on the rise in the United States, and the increasing use of electricity in homes and businesses posed a serious threat to property and human life.

In order to determine and mitigate risk, Merrill proposed to open a laboratory where he would use scientific principles to test products for fire and electrical safety. The Boston Board of Fire Underwriters turned this idea down, perhaps due to Merrill's youth and relative inexperience at the time.

In May 1893, Merrill moved to Chicago to work for the Chicago Fire Underwriters' Association. His task was to inspect the city's fire alarm systems. He was also sent to the 1893 World's Fair to inspect the Fair's electrical installations and the Palace of Electricity. In order to determine and mitigate risk in his role as an electrical inspector, Merrill found it necessary to conduct tests on building materials and electrical components. Upon seeing a growing potential in this field, Merrill stayed in Chicago to found Underwriters Laboratories. He received initial funding from the Chicago Fire Underwriters' Association and the Western Insurance Union, a local insurance organization. With $350 of equipment, he opened a small laboratory on the third floor of a local fire insurance patrol station, signing UL's first test report on March 24, 1894.

Merrill soon went to work on developing safety standards, conducting tests, and uncovering hazards. In the early years, UL tested three main types of products: devices meant to stop fire (such as fire extinguishers), devices meant to resist fire (such as fire doors), and devices that frequently caused fire (like wires used for electrical installations). This work soon expanded, and throughout the twentieth century, UL certified many pivotal consumer technologies, such as vacuum cleaners, televisions, microwaves, personal computers, and more.

UL published its first standard, "Tin Clad Fire Doors", in 1903. In 1906, UL established a Label Service for certain product categories that require more frequent inspections. Products that passed UL's testing and regular inspections were given a UL label, which eventually evolved into the UL Mark. From 1905 to 1979, UL Headquarters was located at 207-231 East Ohio Street in Chicago. In 1979, the organization moved its headquarters to a 153-acre campus in Northbrook, Illinois, 25 miles north of its former downtown Chicago location.

UL Solutions has evolved from its roots in electrical and fire safety to address broader safety issues, such as hazardous substances, water quality, food safety, performance testing, safety and compliance education, and environmental sustainability.

On January 1, 2012, Underwriters Laboratories became the parent company of a for-profit company in the U.S named UL LLC, a limited liability corporation. The for-profit company took over the product testing and certification business.

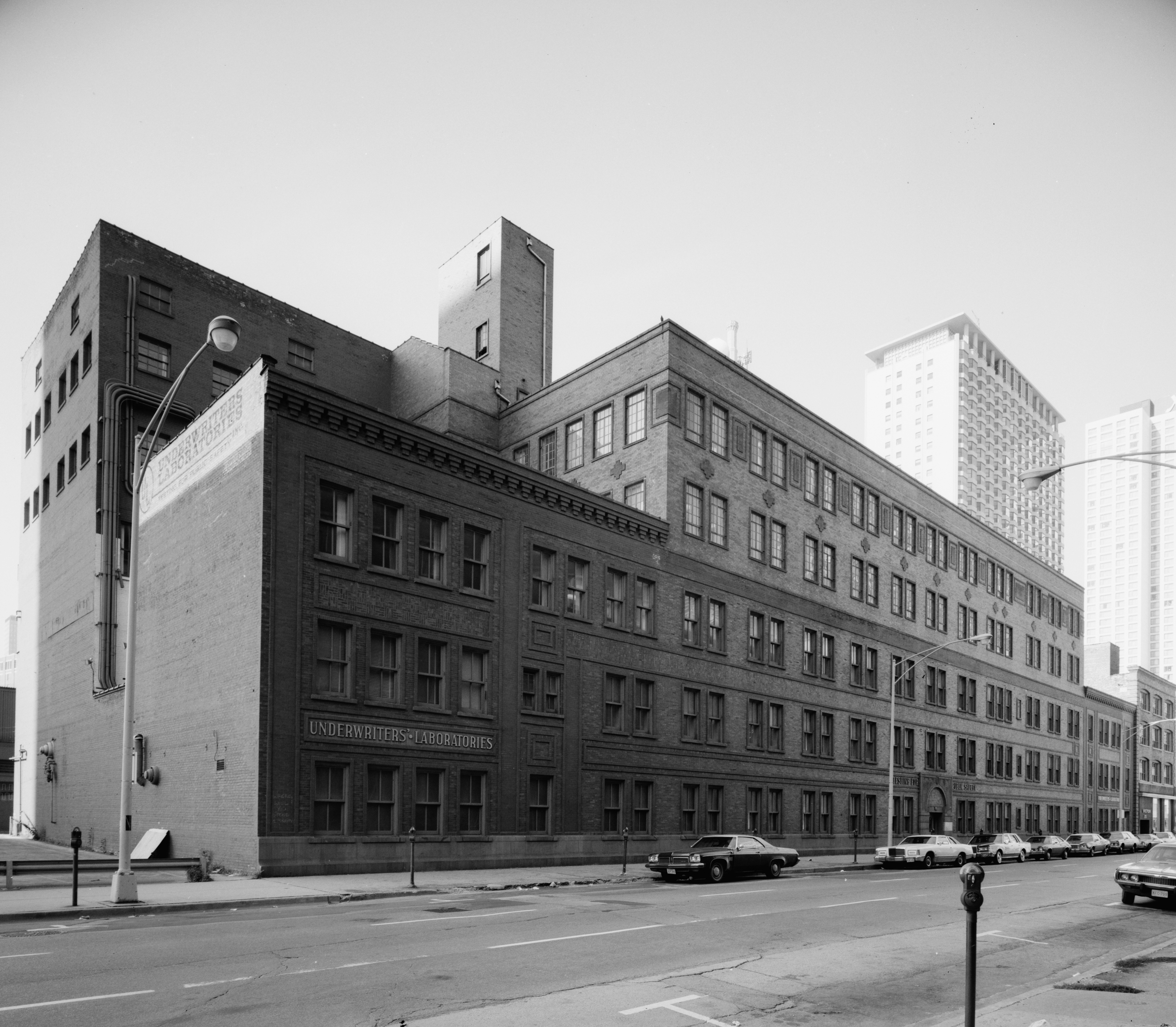
Underwriters' Laboratories, 207-231 East Ohio Street, Chicago

In 2022, the company revised their go-to-market strategy to include three separate organizations - UL Solutions, UL Standards & Engagement, and UL Research Institutes.

UL Solutions became a public company via an initial public offering in April 2024 raising around $950 million, valuing the company at about $7 billion. The company is listed on the New York Stock Exchange.

== UL Standards ==
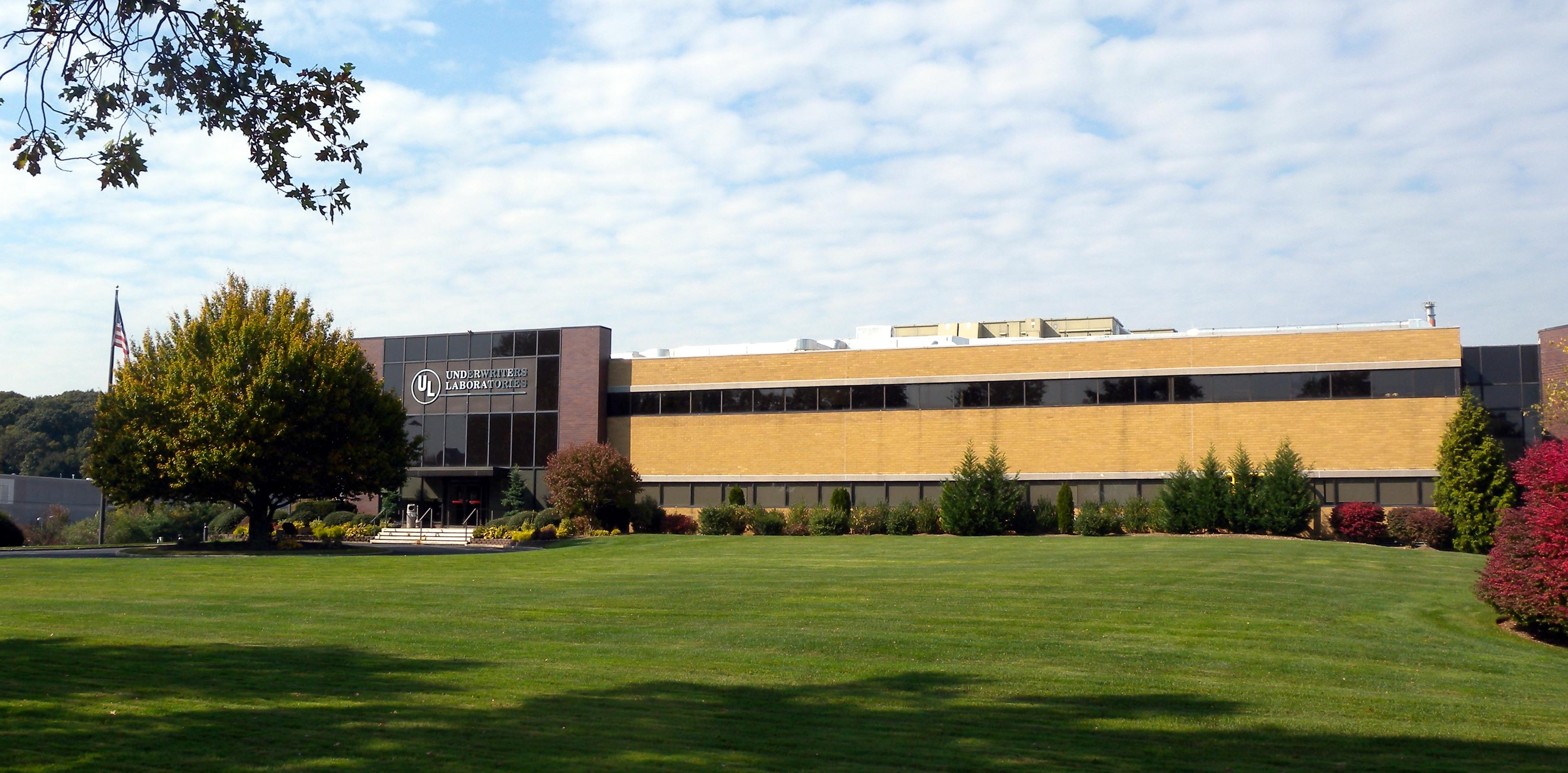
Melville, New York, location

=== Sustainability standards ===
- UL 106, Standard for Sustainability for Luminaires (under development)
- UL 110, Standard for Sustainability for Mobile Phones

=== Standards for electrical and electronic products ===
- UL 50, Enclosures for Electrical Equipment
- UL 50E, Enclosures for Electrical Equipment, Environmental Considerations
- UL 153, Portable Electric Lamps
- UL 197, Commercial Electrical Cooking Appliances
- UL 244B, Field Installed and/or Field Connected Appliance Controls
- UL 410, Slip Resistance of Floor Surface Materials
- UL 651, Schedule 40, 80, Type EB and A Rigid PVC Conduit and Fittings
- UL 796, Printed-Wiring Boards
- UL 962B, Outline for Merchandise Display and Rack Mounted Power Distribution Units
- UL 970, Retail Fixtures and Merchandising Displays
- UL 1026, Electric Household Cooking and Food Serving Appliances
- UL 1083, Household Electric Skillets and Frying-Type Appliances
- UL 1492, Audio/Video Products and Accessories
- UL 1598, Luminaires
- UL 1642, Lithium Batteries
- UL 1653, Electrical Nonmetallic Tubing
- UL 1995, Heating and Cooling Equipment
- UL 2267 Standard for Safety - Fuel Cell Power Systems for Installation in Industrial Electric Trucks
- UL 6500, Audio/Video and Musical Instrument Apparatuses for Household, Commercial and Similar General Uses
- UL 60065, Audio, Video and Similar Electronic Apparatuses: Safety Requirements
- UL 60335-1, Household and Similar Electrical Appliances, Part 1: General Requirements
- UL 60335-2-24, Household and Similar Electrical Appliances, Part 2: Particular Requirements for Motor Compressors
- UL 60335-2-3, Household and Similar Electrical Appliances, Part 2: Particular Requirements for Electric Irons
- UL 60335-2-34, Household and Similar Electrical Appliances, Part 2: Particular Requirements for Motor Compressors
- UL 60335-2-8, Household and Similar Electrical Appliances, Part 2: Particular Requirements for Shavers, Hair Clippers and Similar Appliances
- UL 60950, Information Technology Equipment
- UL 60950-1, Information Technology Equipment – Safety, Part 1: General Requirements
- UL 60950-21, Information Technology Equipment – Safety, Part 21: Remote Power Feeding
- UL 60950-22, Information Technology Equipment – Safety, Part 22: Equipment to be Installed Outdoors
- UL 60950-23, Information Technology Equipment – Safety, Part 23: Large Data Storage Equipment
- UL 61010-1, Safety Requirements for Electrical Equipment For Measurement, Control, and Laboratory Use; Part 1: General Requirements
- UL 62368-1, Audio/Video, Information and Communication Technology Equipment – Part 1: Safety Requirements

=== Life-safety standards ===
- UL 217, Single- and Multiple- Station Smoke Alarms
- UL 268, Smoke Detectors for Fire Protective Signaling Systems
- UL 268A, Smoke Detectors for Duct Application
- UL 752, Bulletproofing standards
- UL 1626, Residential Sprinklers for Fire Protection Service
- UL 1971, Signaling Devices for the Hearing Impaired

=== Standards for building products ===
- UL 10A, Tin-Clad Fire Doors
- UL 20, General-Use Snap Switches
- UL 486E, Equipment Wiring Terminals for Use with Aluminum and/or Copper Conductors
- UL 1256, Fire Test of Roof/Deck Constructions

=== Standards for industrial control equipment ===
- UL 508, Industrial Control Equipment, superseded by UL 60947-4-1
- UL 508A, Industrial Control Panels
- UL 508C, Power Conversion Equipment, superseded by UL 61800-5-1
- UL 61800-5-1, Adjustable Speed Electrical Power Drive Systems

=== Standards for plastic materials ===
- UL 94, Tests for Flammability of Plastic Materials for Parts in Devices and Appliances
- UL 746A, Polymeric Materials: Short-Term Property Evaluations
- UL 746B, Polymeric Materials: Long-Term Property Evaluations
- UL 746C, Polymeric Materials: Use in Electrical Equipment Evaluations.
- UL 746D, Polymeric Materials: Fabricated Parts
- UL 746E, Polymeric Materials: Industrial Laminates, Filament Wound Tubing, Vulcanized Fiber and Materials Used in Printed-Wiring Boards
- UL 746F, Polymeric Materials: Flexible Dielectric Film Materials for Use in Printed-Wiring Boards and Flexible Materials Interconnect Constructions

=== Standards for wire and cable ===
- UL 62, Flexible Cords and Cables
- UL 590J, Electric Insulating Tape
- UL 758, Appliance Wiring Material (AWM)
- UL 817, Cord Sets and Power Supply Cords
- UL 2556, Wire and Cable Test Methods

=== Standards for alarm systems, installation, and monitoring ===
- UL 294, Access Control System Units (ANSI Approved: May 24, 2023)
- UL 365, Standard for Police Station Connected Burglar Alarm Units and Systems (ANSI Approved: January 31, 2018)
- UL 464, Audible Signaling Devices for Fire Alarm and Signaling Systems, Including Accessories (ANSI Approved: April 28, 2023)
- UL 497, Protectors for Paired-Conductor Communications Circuits (ANSI Approved: July 25, 2022)
- UL 497A, Standard for Secondary Protectors for Communications Circuit (ANSI Approved: October 1, 2019)
- UL 497B, Protectors for Data Communications and Fire-Alarm Circuits (ANSI Approved: February 7, 2022)
- UL 603, Standard for Power Supplies for Use with Burglar-Alarm Systems (ANSI Approved: July 6, 2018)
- UL 609, Standard for Local Burglar Alarm Units and Systems (ANSI Approved: March 9, 2018)
- UL 636, Standard for Holdup Alarm Units and Systems (DOD Approved: July 30, 1987, ANSI Approved: January 30, 2018)
- UL 639, Standard for Intrusion-Detection Units (ANSI Approved: October 24, 2019)
- UL 681, Installation and Classification of Burglar and Holdup Alarm Systems (DOD Approved: January 2, 1992, ANSI Approved: December 17, 2020)
- UL 827, Central-Station Alarm Services (ANSI Approved: October 19, 2023)
- UL 827A, UL LLC Outline of Investigation for Hosted Central Station Services
- UL 864, Control Units and Accessories for Fire Alarm Systems (ANSI Approved: October 9, 2023)
- UL 985, Household Fire Warning System Units (ANSI Approved: October 7, 2022)
- UL 1023, Household Burglar-Alarm System Units (ANSI Approved: May 20, 2021)
- UL 1034, Standard for Burglary-Resistant Electric Locking Mechanisms (ANSI Approved: June 3, 2020)
- UL 1037, Antitheft Alarms and Devices (ANSI Approved: August 24, 2023)
- UL 1076, Proprietary Burglar Alarm Units and Systems (DOD Approved: April 9, 1992, ANSI Approved: February 16, 2021)
- UL 1481, Standard for Power Supplies for Fire-Protective Signaling Systems
- UL 1610, Central-Station Burglar-Alarm Units
- UL 1635, Standard for Digital Alarm Communicator System Units (ANSI Approved: April 13, 2018)
- UL 1981, Central-Station Automation Systems (ANSI Approved: March 29, 2023)
- UL 2050, National Industrial Security Systems (Revised: November 7, 2010)
- UL 2610, Commercial Premises Security Alarm Units and Systems (ANSI Approved: April 7, 2021)
- UL 2900-1, Software Cybersecurity for Network-Connectable Products, Part 1: General Requirements (ANSI Approved: April 14, 2023)
- UL 2900-2-3, Software Cybersecurity for Network-Connectable Products, Part 2-3: Particular Requirements for Security and Life Safety Signaling Systems (ANSI Approved: September 21, 2023)

=== UL Solutions of Canada ===
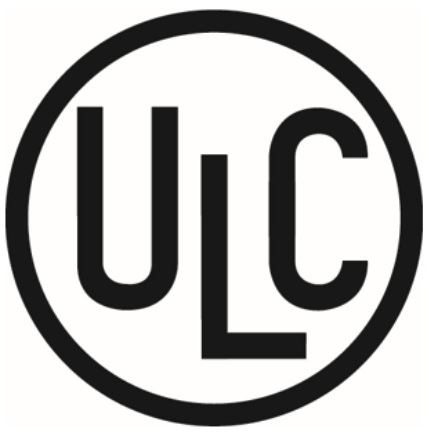
A certification logo for the Canadian division of UL Solutions

- CAN/ULC-S101-07, Standard Methods for Fire Endurance Tests of Building Construction and Materials
- CAN/ULC-S102-10, Standard Methods of Test for Surface-Burning Characteristics of Building Materials and Assemblies
- CAN/ULC-S102.2-10, Standard Methods of Test for Surface-Burning Characteristics of Flooring, Floor Coverings, and Miscellaneous Materials and Assemblies
- CAN/ULC-S104-10, Standard Methods for Fire Tests of Door Assemblies
- CAN/ULC-S107-10, Standard Methods for Fire Tests of Roof Coverings
- CAN/ULC-S303-M91 (R1999), Standard Methods for Local Burglar Alarm Units and Systems

=== Photovoltaic ===
- UL 1703, Photovoltaic Flat-Plate Modules
- UL 1741, Inverters, Converters, Controllers and Interconnection System Equipment for Use With Distributed Energy Resources
- UL 2703, Rack Mounting Systems and Clamping Devices for Flat-Plate Photovoltaic Modules and Panels

== Recognized Component Mark ==
The Recognized Component Mark

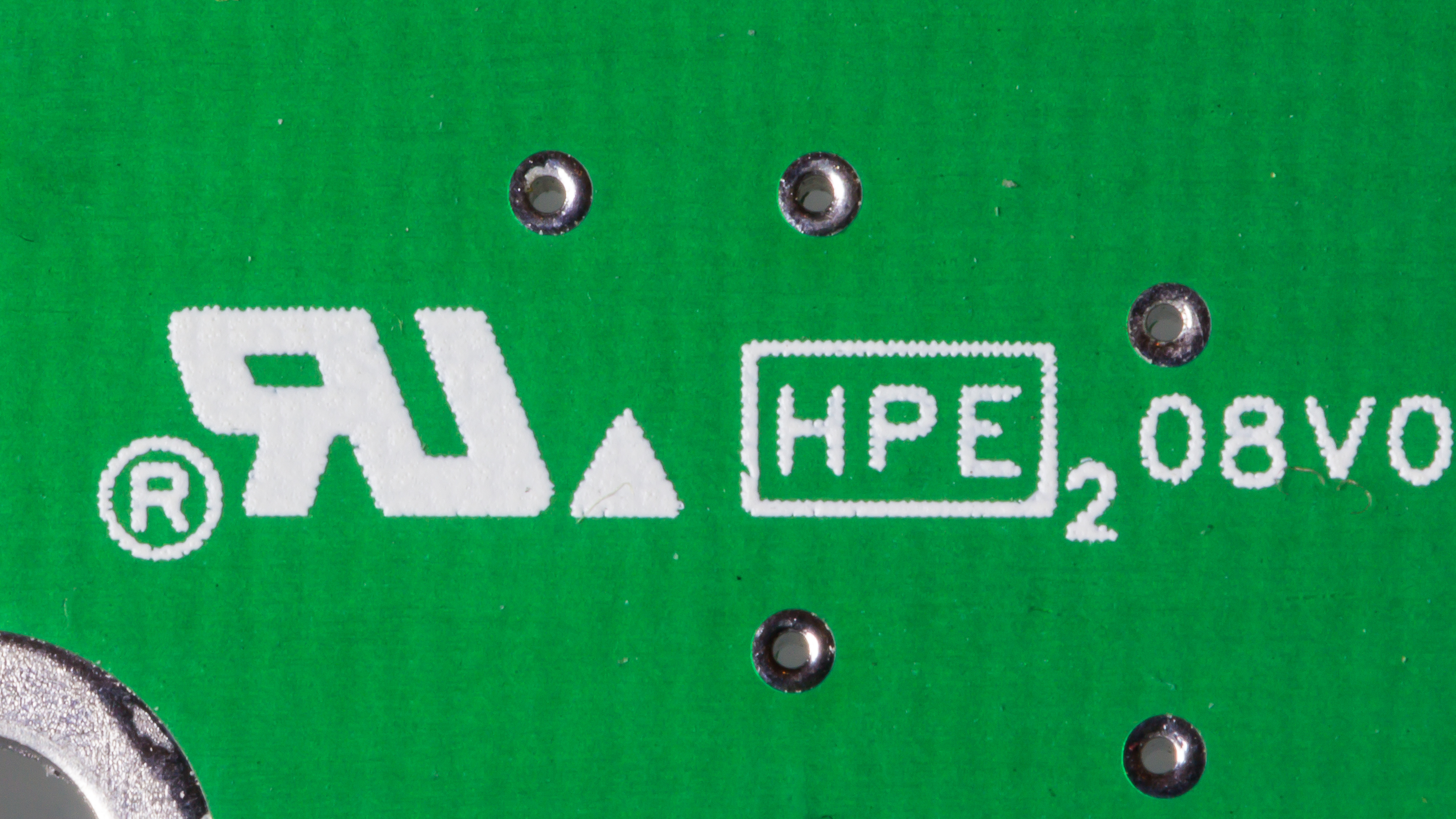
The Recognized Component Mark (left) on a printed circuit board

The Recognized Component Mark (stylized as ЯU) is a type of safety certification mark issued by UL Solutions. It is placed on components which are intended to be part of a UL certified end product, but which cannot bear the full UL mark themselves. The general public does not ordinarily come across it, as it is borne on components which make up finished products.

== Computer benchmarking ==
UL offers the following computer benchmarking products:

- 3DMark
- Easy Benchmark Automation
- PCMark 10
- PCMark for Android
- Servermark
- Testdriver
- UL Procyon AI Inference Benchmark
- UL Procyon Photo Editing Benchmark
- UL Procyon Video Editing Benchmark
- VRMark

== See also ==
- ANSI
- CE marking
- Conformance mark
- Consumer Reports
- Consumers Union
- Fire test
- Good Housekeeping Seal
- National Sanitation Foundation
- Nationally Recognized Testing Laboratory
- NEMKO
- Product certification
- Quality control
- RoHS
- Safety engineering
- Société Générale de Surveillance
- AENOR
