= Standards for Alarm Systems, Installation, and Monitoring =

Standards for alarm systems, installation and monitoring, are standards critical for ensuring safety, reliability, and interoperability. Various standards organizations, both international and regional, develop these guidelines and best practices. Globally recognized bodies such as ISO and IEC provide comprehensive frameworks applicable worldwide, while regional standards may cater to specific local requirements, enhancing the applicability and effectiveness of alarm systems in different environments.

== US-based standards ==
Standards developed in the United States primarily include those developed the US Government, National Fire Protection Association, and Underwriters Laboratories.

=== Underwriters Laboratories ===
==== UL 294 ====
The Underwriters Laboratories' UL 294 is a safety standard that addresses the construction, performance, and operation of access control systems intended to regulate or control entry into and exit from secured areas. These systems can also restrict access to certain devices through electrical, electronic, or mechanical means. The standard is designed to ensure that these systems are constructed, perform, and operate effectively to secure sensitive or restricted areas. Many organizations will require products to be certified to exclude non-compliant systems from acquisition. This makes it an important standard for manufacturers to comply with.

The scope of UL 294 extends to systems that include functionalities such as reporting and recording entry and exit activities, although it does not evaluate the accuracy of such data. The standard categorizes security performance into four levels, from Level I (lowest, no encryption, no attack test) to Level IV (highest, AES 256, 5-minute attack test), providing guidelines according to the degree of security required.

Significantly, if an access control system includes features typical of a burglar alarm control unit, it must also comply with standards such as UL 1076 for Proprietary Burglar Alarm Units and Systems or UL 2610 for Commercial Premises Security Alarm Units and Systems.

The sixth edition, in 2013, introduced the needs to comply with UL 1076 and UL 636 when access control components are used for IDS and panic alarm, respectively.

The eighth edition of UL 294, published on May 24, 2023, introduces several updates and revisions including:

- Enhanced specifications for Power over Communication Cable Equipment and Remote Access.
- Updated requirements for Software/Firmware Upgrades.
- New standards for Egress Control Systems and Key Management Systems.
- Revised tests for power supply overload and endurance, as well as updates to the Destructive Attack Test.

These updates ensure that UL 294 stays current with technological advancements and changing security needs, ensuring that access control systems provide reliable and effective security solutions. The standard's current edition was designated as an American National Standard (ANSI) standard. Other standards, such as the IBC since 2012, reference and require compliance with UL 294 (as of 2024, either UL 294 or UL 1034) . The IBC references the UL standards for special locking arrangements, when egress requires the usage of special procedures, keys, or knowledge.

==== UL 365 ====
The Underwriters Laboratories' UL 365 is a safety standard that governs the construction, performance, and maintenance of police station-connected burglar alarm units and systems. These systems are designed primarily for use in mercantile premises, including mercantile safes and vaults, as well as bank safes and vaults.

The standard specifies that these alarm systems include protective circuits and devices that connect through a control apparatus to a sounding device. This device can be mounted either inside or outside the premises housing the protected property. Activation of the alarm by intrusion or disturbance results in a signal being transmitted to a constantly-staffed police department and the sounding device being activated until it is manually deactivated, power is exhausted, or an automatic timer shuts it off.

Additionally, the operation of these systems may be partially controlled by the property owner, but maintenance and regular inspection by the installing company are mandatory. This includes prompt responses to service calls from the owner or the police.

The alarm transmission methods covered under UL 365 can be categorized under standard line security or encrypted line security. The systems are required to operate within the limits of Class 2 remote control and signal circuits as defined by the National Electrical Code, NFPA 70.

The fifth edition of this standard, issued on January 31, 2018, was notable for expanding the media to include website information. However, as of January 31, 2023, UL 365 has been superseded by the second edition of UL 2610, which now covers the standards for commercial premises security alarm units and systems, incorporating the provisions that were once under UL 365.

==== UL 2050 ====
The Underwriters Laboratories' UL 2050 was established to focus on the certification requirements for National Industrial Security Systems, particularly those used by U.S. government facilities and defense contractors to protect classified information, it is not available to members of the general public. This standard is crucial for organizations that design, install, and service high-security systems, ensuring they meet the stringent security requirements set by the Department of Defense, Intelligence Community, and other federal agencies.

The main components of UL 2050 include monitoring, signal processing, investigation, and servicing of security systems. These systems are required to provide a high level of intrusion detection and are subject to rigorous testing and certification processes. Areas certified under UL 2050 are evaluated based on their ability to handle sensitive security tasks and their adherence to specific operational benchmarks, such as sensitive compartmented information facilities (SCIFs) and closed rooms, ensuring that all components like alarms and monitoring systems meet the strict criteria set forth in the standard.

UL 2050 certification is specific to rooms or facilities rather than entire businesses. The certification process is thorough, emphasizing the security and functionality of alarm systems designed to protect sensitive information within controlled areas. Regular inspections and compliance checks ensure these systems meet ongoing security standards.

==== UL 2610 ====
The Underwriters Laboratories' UL 2610 is a comprehensive safety standard that governs the construction, performance, operation, and maintenance of security alarm systems and units for commercial premises, such as mercantile and banking locations. The standard details requirements for a range of alarm systems including central station burglar alarms, police station connected alarms, local alarms, proprietary systems, holdup alarms, and digital alarm communicator system units. It also covers power supplies essential for burglar-alarm equipment operation.

The second edition of UL 2610, published on January 31, 2023, supersedes several previous editions of related standards, consolidating and updating the requirements for these systems. Standards that have been updated include UL 365, UL 603, UL 609, UL 636, UL 1076, UL 1610, and UL 1635, among others.

This standard specifies the technical criteria for various components and aspects of the alarm systems, such as installation requirements, enclosures, electrical protection, field wiring connections, internal wiring, and the performance of components under normal and abnormal conditions. Extensive testing procedures are outlined for ensuring reliability and safety of the alarm systems, including endurance, electrical supervision, environmental resistance, and mechanical strength tests.

In addition to physical components and performance tests, UL 2610 includes guidelines on software-based receiving equipment, remote access security, communication data integrity standards, and operational instructions for system installations.

UL 2610 plays a crucial role in ensuring the effectiveness and safety of commercial security systems, serving as a guideline that manufacturers and installers must adhere to for certification and compliance. Recognized by the U.S. Government, UL 2610's inclusion in the Occupational Safety and Health Administration's (OSHA) Nationally Recognized Testing Laboratory (NRTL) Program is confirmed by its final approval in the Federal Register. This endorsement underlines the standard's critical importance in enhancing security measures across various governmental and defense facilities.

===== Tests =====
UL 2610 covers a comprehensive range of tests designed to ensure the reliability, safety, and effectiveness of commercial premises security alarm systems. These tests can be grouped into several categories:

- Performance Tests
- Operational Tests
- Electrical Tests
- Environmental and Mechanical Tests
- Security Tests
- Component-Specific Tests
- Field Wiring and Installation Tests
