= NRTL =

NRTL may refer to:

- Nationally Recognized Testing Laboratories
- National Right To Life
- Navio da República Timor-Leste, "Ship of the Republic of East Timor", ship prefix identifying a commissioned ship of the East Timorese Navy or National Police.
- Non-Random Two Liquid model
