= Food-grade lubricant =

Type of material

Food-grade lubricants are specialized industrial lubricants designed for use in environments where there is potential for incidental contact with food or beverages. These lubricants are used to ensure both the proper functioning of machinery and the safety of the products being processed. Their applications span food processing, pharmaceuticals, cosmetics, and animal feed industries. These lubricants are tightly regulated to ensure they do not contaminate food products and pose a health risk.

== Standards ==
The most common standards and certifications in this space are NSF International's H1 certification and ISO 21469. If a lubricant meets the requirements for ISO 21469, it automatically satisfies all the requirements of NSF's H1 certification, as ISO 21469 is more comprehensive. Conversely, achieving NSF's H1 certification can serve as a foundational step toward obtaining ISO 21469 certification, simplifying the process for manufacturers who wish to meet the higher standard.

=== NSF International ===
The NSF International is a leading organization that sets standards for food-grade lubricants. NSF International standards ensure that lubricants meet stringent safety and quality requirements. The primary classifications for food-grade lubricants under NSF standards are:

NSF Standards for Food-Grade Lubricants
Standard	Description	Use Case
H1	Incidental food contact (<10 ppm).	Equipment near food that may accidentally touch it.
H2	Products approved for food-adjacent use. No food contact allowed.	Machinery parts that do not touch food.
H3	Soluble oils for rust prevention.	Hooks and trolleys in food processing plants.
HX-1	Additives for H1 lubricants (incidental contact).	Enhancing properties of H1 lubricants.
HX-2	Additives for H2 lubricants (no contact).	Enhancing properties of H2 lubricants.
HX-3	Additives for H3 lubricants (soluble oils).	Enhancing properties of H3 lubricants.

Once registered, products are listed in the NSF White Book, a publicly accessible directory of certified nonfood compounds."NSF White Book". NSF International.

There are more than 12,000 H1 food-grade lubricants registered globally, with an average yearly growth rate of 7% for H1 lubricants registered by NSF.

=== ISO 21469 ===
ISO 21469:2006, titled "Safety of machinery—Lubricants with incidental product contact—Hygiene requirements," is an internationally recognized certification that specifies hygiene requirements for the formulation, manufacture, and handling of food-grade lubricants.ISO 21469: Safety of Machinery – Lubricants with Incidental Product Contact – Hygiene Requirements (Report). ISO. 2006.

Key aspects of ISO 21469 certification include:

- On-site audits to verify compliance with hygiene and safety requirements.
- Mandatory product testing to ensure the formulation matches certification.
- Label reviews for proper product identification and traceability.
- Validation of good manufacturing practices (GMP).

ISO 21469 certification requires prior ISO 9001 certification, which establishes a quality management system (QMS) foundation. Products certified under ISO 21469 demonstrate a manufacturer’s commitment to food safety and regulatory compliance.Nonfood Compounds Program: Food-Grade Lubricants (Report). NSF International. April 2024.

Food-grade lubricants exported into or imported out of Brazil must be certified to ISO 21469. A database of all ISO 21469 certified lubricants is maintained at the NSF's website.

It is noteworthy that ISO 21469 has not been updated since 2006.

=== FDA ===
The U.S. FDA’s Code of Federal Regulations Title 21 Section 178.3570 (21 CFR) specifies an ingredient whitelist that both NSF and ISO standards abide by. The lubricant must also be:

- Odorless
- Colorless
- Tasteless

There is a 10 parts per million (ppm) limit for lubricant base oils (e.g., mineral oil) that can be present in food if incidental contact occurs. To get new food contact substances (FCSs) approved by the FDA, manufacturers must either submit a Food Contact Notification (FCN) filing or apply for a Threshold of Regulation (TOR) exemption.

=== USDA ===
There is a common misconception that lubricants are registered through the USDA. However, the USDA discontinued its registration program for lubricants in 1999.

=== Europe ===
While the European Food Safety Authority provides advice on food safety risks, the EU doesn't formally regulate lubricants themselves, instead typically following the U.S. restrictions.
