= DUV =

DUV may refer to one of the following

- DUV, "Druck- und Verlagshaus Frankfurt am Main", the publisher Frankfurter Rundschau
- Dampfkessel Überwachungsverein (DÜV), German organizations founded in the 19th century to ensure the technical safety of steam boilers
- Diffey weighted UV irradiance
- Deep ultraviolet
