= Elora López-Nandam =

- Website: eloralopez.github.io

Elora López-Nandam is an evolutionary biologist and 2022 Forbes 30 Under 30 scientist. She is currently a Research Scientist at California Academy of Sciences in their Coral Regeneration lab. She was previously a Hope For Reefs Postdoctoral Researcher at the California Academy of Sciences and currently continues to collaborate with Steinhart Aquarium biologists on echinoderm breeding genomics.

Her current research focuses on Aquarium Breeding Genomics and selecting heat-tolerant coral larvae to be raised into more heat-tolerant adult corals as a climate resilience measure for coastal and island communities.

Her expertise has been featured within PBS' Big Pacific, Episode 2, USA Today, The Atlantic, The Guardian, and The San Francisco Chronicle and she has presented at a variety of conferences nationally and internationally for her work on coral genomics and resilience. Her research sites and regions of expertise include the Marshall Islands, Fiji, Bikini Atoll, American Samoa and Palau, and Hopkins Marine Station in Monterey, California.

== Education ==
Elora López-Nandam graduated from Columbia University in 2015 with a B.A. in Environmental Biology (Ecology and Evolution track). She went on to receive her Ph.D from Stanford University in 2021 in Biology (Hopkins Marine Station). Her Ph.D work focused on coral bleaching, genome maintenance, the effects of nuclear testing on the genomes of wildlife, and coral lineages broadly.

She partook in a NSF Biology REU at the American Museum of Natural History in 2013 and an NSF Graduate Research Fellowship from 2015-2018. She was also named a National Geographic Early Career Explorer in 2018 and received the Explorers Club Rolex Explorer Grant. From 2015-2020 she was also a Morgridge Family Fellow (Stanford Graduate Fellowship in Science and Engineering).

== Publications ==
- Falotico J*, Love A*, López-Nandam EH, Albright R. Analyzing effects of experimental treatments on growth and survivorship rates of stony coral recruits. Poster presentation for National Diversity in STEM (NDiSTEM) Conference in Portland, Oregon. October 26, 2023. *student mentee
- Ho I, López-Nandam EH, Albright R, Prakash M. Behavior plasticity in free swimming coral larvae via long term tracking microscopy. Oral presentation for American Physical Society in Las Vegas, NV. March 2023.
- López-Nandam EH, Payne CY, Delbeek JC, Dunker F, Krol L, Larkin L, Lev K, Ross R, Schaeffer R, Yong S, Albright R. Kinship and genetic variation in aquarium-bred corals. Oral presentation for Reef Futures. September 28, 2022.
- López-Nandam EH, Payne CY, Delbeek JC, Dunker F, Krol L, Larkin L, Lev K, Ross R, Schaeffer R, Yong S, Albright R. Kinship and selection in aquarium-bred corals. Oral presentation online for the International Coral Reef Symposium. July 2022.
- López-Nandam EH & Albright R. Kinship and selection in aquarium-bred corals. Oral presentation for Reef Futures Virtual. December 16, 2021.
- López-Nandam EH, Albright R, Hanson EA, Sheets EA, Palumbi SR. Resilience of coral organisms on the molecular level, and adaptation on the cellular level. Oral presentation online for the International Coral Reef Symposium. July 22, 2021.
- López EH, Albright R, Palumbi SR. Asexual and sexual mutation inheritance in clonal coral colonies. Oral presentation online for the SMBE Fitch Symposium. View on YouTube. June 30, 2020.
- López EH, Albright R, Palumbi SR. Genome integrity and the heritability of somatic mutation in clonal, colonial corals. Poster presentation online for The Allied Genetics Conference. View on FigShare. April 2020.
- López EH & Palumbi SR. Somatic mutations and genome stability maintenance in clonal coral colonies. Poster presentation at the Society for Molecular Biology and Evolution in Manchester, England. July 22, 2019.
- López EH & Palumbi SR. Patterns and frequency of variation among asexual clones in a long-lived coral species. Oral presentation at the American Genetics Association Presidential Symposium in Portland, OR. June 3, 2019.
- López EH & Palumbi SR. Considering somatic mutations and genome maintenance capacity in colonial cnidarians. Poster presentation at the Society for Molecular Biology and Evolution in Yokohama, Japan. July 9, 2018.
- López EH & Palumbi SR. Uncovering within-colony coral diversity using high-throughput sequencing data. Oral presentation at the International Coral Reef Symposium in Honolulu, HI. June 20, 2016.
- López EH, Le MD, Nguyễn TV, Dương HT, Cao GTH, Sterling EJ, Blair ME. Inferring molecular phylogenetic relationships among slow lorises (genus Nycticebus) with mitochondrial DNA sequence data. Poster presentation at the XXV International Primatological Congress in Hanoi, Vietnam. August 15, 2014.
- López EH & Drew JA. Comparative phylogeography of Indo-Pacific marine taxa presents idiosyncratic genetic connectivity patterns. Oral presentation at the Society for Conservation Biology Oceania Section Meetings in Suva, Fiji. July 9, 2014.
