= William Henry Merrill =

American electrical engineer

William Henry Merrill (December 29, 1868 – September 17, 1923) was an American electrical engineer who founded Underwriters Laboratories (UL) in 1894.

== Biography ==
Merrill was born December 29, 1868, in Warsaw, New York. He was the son of William Henry Merrill Jr. (1840–1907), an editorial writer of the Boston Herald, and Flora Agnes Judd (1842–1880). He graduated from the Massachusetts Institute of Technology (MIT) in 1889. In 1897 he married Bessie A. Henderson (1872–1956); they had five children. He was a member of the Midday and University clubs of Chicago and of the Sigma Chi college fraternity. He died on September 17, 1923, at the Presbyterian Hospital in Chicago, Illinois. His burial was held at the Merrill Plot at Warsaw Cemetery in Warsaw, Wyoming County, New York.

== Career ==
Merrill began his professional career as an electrical engineer in Boston, Massachusetts. In 1893, he was hired by insurers for the World's Columbian Exposition in Chicago to examine the safety of the electrical wiring in the Palace of Electricity. This experience led him to eventually found the Underwriter's Electrical Bureau in 1894, which later became Underwriters Laboratories in 1903. From 1903 to 1909, he was the Secretary and Treasurer of the National Fire Protection Association, becoming the President of the association from 1910 to 1912. In 1916 he became the first president of Underwriters Laboratories, which subsequently grew into an international safety consulting and certification company. In 1918 he was drafted for war service at $1 per year, serving as chairman of the fire prevention section of the war industries board.
