= Hungribles =

2011 video game

- Developer(s): Futuremark
- Platform(s): iOS
- Release: July 2011
- Genre(s): Puzzle video game
- Mode(s): Single-player

Hungribles is a puzzle video game developed by Finnish software development company Futuremark. It was released for iOS in July 2011 and became Apple's iPhone Game of the Week at launch. In March 2012, Futuremark Games Studio was acquired by Rovio Entertainment, creator of Angry Birds.

== Gameplay ==
Hungribles are tiny creatures with massive appetites. Their hunger cravings are so powerful they can pull food through the air and into their mouths. The aim of the game is to feed Hungribles by launching tasty orbs from a mushroom slingshot.
