= Futuremark =

Defunct Finnish software company

Futuremark Oy
- Company type: Subsidiary
- Industry: Computer software
- Founded: November 1997; 27 years ago
- Defunct: 23 April 2018
- Fate: Acquired and rebranded
- Successor: UL Benchmarks
- Headquarters: Espoo, Finland
- Area served: Worldwide
- Products: Computer benchmark applications
- Parent: UL
- Website: benchmarks.ul.com

Futuremark Oy was a Finnish software development company that produced computer benchmark applications for home, business, and press use. Futuremark was acquired by UL on 31 October 2014, and was formally merged into the company on 23 April 2018.

== History ==
Prior to Futuremark, the founding team developed Final Reality at Remedy Entertainment in 1997. It is a benchmarking tool distributed via computer magazine supplements and co-developed with VNU European Labs, part of the Netherlands-based publishing group VNU Business Publications. Following the tool's release, Futuremark was founded in Espoo in November 1997 and formally launched on 27 February 1998.

Soon after being founded the company altered its trading name to "MadOnion.com" until finally settling on "Futuremark Corporation" in 2002.

The 3DMark series has been the company's most popular and successful to date.

Futuremark's applications are distributed via the Internet as well as offline media. In addition to its benchmarking software, the company has also provided services such as IHV/ISV customised benchmarks, 3D demos as well as online and data services.

In March 2007, Futuremark launched a website specialising in news and reviews of PC games, called YouGamers.

In January 2008, Futuremark announced the formation of the Futuremark Games Studio. In August 2008, at the Leipzig Games Convention, Futuremark Games Studio announced details of its first game, Shattered Horizon.

In December 2009, Futuremark's mobile and embedded business unit was spun off and renamed Rightware.

In March 2012, Futuremark sold its game development division to Rovio Entertainment (developer of the Angry Birds franchise) for an undisclosed sum. The sale was intended to allow the company to focus on its benchmarking software.

On 31 October 2014, Futuremark was acquired by UL for an undisclosed sum.

On 23 April 2018, Futuremark was rebranded as UL Benchmarks. The Futuremark website was closed, and its content was moved to a new UL Benchmarks website. Despite the acquisition and rebranding, UL Benchmarks retains its headquarters and R&D operations in Espoo, Finland.

== Products ==
=== PC benchmarks ===
- 3DMark
- PCMark
- Powermark
- Servermark
- VRMark

=== Smartphone and tablet benchmarks ===
- 3DMark
- PCMark for Android

=== Cellphone benchmarks ===
- 3DMarkMobile
- VGMark
- SimulationMark
- SPMark

=== Video games ===
- Shattered Horizon (PC)
- Hungribles (iOS)
- Unstoppable Gorg (PC, Mac, iPad)

=== Other products ===
- Peacekeeper, web browser benchmark
- XL-R8R, based on 3DMark2000
- Video2000, video performance benchmark
