= Rightware =

Finnish software company

- Type: Private
- Industry: Information Technology
- Founded: 2009
- Headquarters: Helsinki, Finland
- Area served: Global
- Key people: Tero Koivu, Co-Founder & Co-CEO; Qiang Qian, Co-CEO
- Brands: Kanzi UI framework, Kanzi Services
- Number of employees: 140-150
- Website: rightware.com

Rightware is a Finnish software development company that provides automotive graphics software tools and services. These include services in gaming, graphics, and UI development, with a particular focus on the automotive industry. Headquartered in Helsinki, Finland. Rightware has offices in Detroit, Tokyo, Seoul, Shanghai, Brighton, and Munich.

== History ==
Rightware was founded in December 2009 after Futuremark spins off its Mobile & Embedded Benchmark unit.

In January 2011, Rightware released their UI design software called Kanzi, and demonstrated a stereoscopic 3D home screen for Android made by Kanzi at Mobile World Congress 2011.

In 2013, it was announced that Audi was using Rightware's Kanzi software for developing digital user interfaces for Audi cars. The first commercial vehicle (Audi A3) with Kanzi technology was shipped in June 2012. At CES 2014, Audi revealed its fully digital Virtual Cockpit instrument cluster, created using Rightware Kanzi.

In 2013, Rightware raised another $5.2 million in venture capital funding.

On May 7, 2015, Rightware divested its graphics benchmarking business to Basemark, a newly formed Helsinki-based company, in a management buyout deal.

In 2015, Rightware announced that it was collaborating with Nissan.

In 2016, Rightware announced the founding members of its Kanzi Partner Program.

In 2016, Rightware stated that over 15 car manufacturers were using its Kanzi software for creating user interfaces.

In 2017, Kanzi powers 35 automotive brands. Rightware becomes a subsidiary of ThunderSoft.

During 2021, Rightware announced the release of Kanzi One, an android compatible all in one HMI tool for automobile's cockpits.

== Products ==
=== Kanzi One ===
Kanzi One is a commercial package including the Kanzi UI framework and a variety of feature packs for further enhancing the HMI in relation to connectivity, mapping, visual effects, 3D vision, and preview capabilities.

Kanzi framework:

- Kanzi Studio: the core HMI development tool, used by designers and embedded engineers to create and customize user interfaces that run on embedded hardware.
- Kanzi Engine: real-time graphics engine, combining physically based rendering with an automotive-grade runtime.

Feature packs:

- Kanzi Connect
- Kanzi Maps
- Kanzi Particles
- Kanzi Shapes
- Kanzi Stereoscopy
- Kanzi VR

== Services ==
Rightware also provides worldwide engineering and design service.
