= Unstoppable Gorg =

2012 video game

- Developer: Futuremark
- Publisher: Headup Games
- Platforms: Microsoft Windows; OS X iPad
- Release: Windows, OS X, iPad: WW: January 19, 2012
- Genre: Tower defense
- Mode: Single-player

Unstoppable Gorg is a tower defense game developed by Futuremark and released on Windows, OS X and iPad on January 19, 2012. In the game, visually inspired by vintage science fiction movies from the 1950s, the player must protect human settlements against armies of alien invaders.

== Gameplay ==
In each level of the game, the player must prevent waves of enemy space ships, launched from motherships on the edges of the screen, from reaching the player's base in the middle of the screen. To accomplish this, the player must deploy various types of armed satellites, which can be placed in predefined slots on different orbits around the base. The player can also rotate an orbit to move all satellites in it to a new position. Destroying all enemies efficiently usually requires the player to reposition their existing satellites so that they can reach new waves of enemies, which can take different paths to the base. In addition to armed satellites, the player can also deploy unarmed satellites, which can, among other things, generate money for buying more satellites, repair other satellites or slow down nearby enemies.

== Plot ==
The plot of the game is inspired by vintage science fiction movies from the 1950s and is presented in the form of short black-and-white movie clips (shot using miniatures and live action actors), which play at the beginning and the end of each level. The game begins when scientists aboard a space station beyond the orbit of Neptune discover Planet X, inhabited by a species known as Gorg. War hero Captain Adam and his fiancée Arielle travel to Planet X to greet the Gorg, only to discover that the aliens have launched an armada of flying saucers to attack the scientists. The player takes on the role of Captain Adam as he organizes the defense of various space stations, moons and planets against the Gorg. As the game progresses, other alien species join the attack on humanity, each bringing their own ships that require different strategies to defeat.

== Reception ==
Unstoppable Gorg received mostly positive reviews, earning a Metacritic average of 85% for the iOS version and 73% for the Windows version.
