= Nationally Recognized Testing Laboratory =

OSHA-approved testing labs

Nationally Recognized Testing Laboratory is the term used by the United States Occupational Safety and Health Administration to identify third-party organizations that have the necessary qualifications to perform safety testing and certification of products covered within OSHA and each organization's scopes. The testing and certification are conducted in accordance with U.S. consensus-based product safety test standards developed or issued by U.S. standards organizations

== Description ==
The United States Occupational Safety and Health Administration (OSHA) requires that 38 different types of products, devices, assemblies, or systems used in the workplace be "approved" (i.e., tested and certified) by third-party organizations identified as Nationally Recognized Testing Laboratories (NRTLs). As part of OSHA's NRTL Program, the recognition is to testing facilities acknowledging that the organizations have the necessary qualifications to perform safety testing and certification of specific products covered within their scopes to provide product safety testing and certification services to manufacturers for use of select types of products, devices, assemblies, or systems. The testing and certification are conducted in accordance with U.S. consensus-based product safety test standards. These test standards are not developed or issued by OSHA but by U.S. standards organizations (e.g., ANSI, the American National Standards Institute) arrived at by consensus amongst representatives of other standards organizations, government agencies, consumer groups, companies, and others. The range of products covered is limited to those items for which OSHA safety standards require "certification" by an NRTL.

The OSHA Office of Technical Programs and Coordination Activities (OTPCA) oversees the NRTL Program and may be reached at 202-693-2110. See the NRTL Program website at https://www.osha.gov/dts/otpca/nrtl/index.html for more information.

NEW: On October 1, 2019, OSHA published an update to the NRTL Program Policies, Procedures, and Guidelines as CPL 01–00–004. This Directive sets forth policies, procedures, and interpretations that supplement and clarify the Nationally Recognized Testing Laboratory (NRTL) Program regulation, 29 CFR 1910.7 and Appendix A to that section. OSHA also published a supportive Directive Transition Memo to implement the Directive's revisions.

== Recognized agencies ==
OSHA, an agency of the United States Department of Labor, publishes a list of Nationally Recognized Testing Laboratories. The following are recognized by OSHA as NRTLs:

| Abbreviation | Name | Notes |
|---|---|---|
| BACL | Bay Area Compliance Laboratories | |
| BVCPS | Bureau Veritas Consumer Products Services, Inc. | |
| CSA | CSA Group Testing and Certification Inc. | Also known as CSA International |
| DEKRA | DEKRA Certification, Inc. | |
| EMT | Element Materials Technology Portland – Evergreen Inc. | |
| MET | Eurofins Electrical and Electronic Testing NA, Inc. | Acquired MET Laboratories, Inc. in 2018 |
| FM | FM Approvals | |
| IAPMO | International Association of Plumbing and Mechanical Officials EGS | |
| ITSNA | Intertek Testing Services NA, Inc. | |
| JET | Japan Electrical Safety & Environment Technology Laboratories | |
| LC | LabTest Certification Inc. | |
| NNA | Nemko North America, Inc. | |
| NSF | NSF International | |
| QAI | QAI Laboratories, LTD | |
| QPS | QPS Evaluation Services, Inc. | |
| SGS | SGS North America, Inc. | |
| PTL | Solar PTL, LLC | |
| SWRI | Southwest Research Institute | |
| TÜV | TÜV Rheinland of North America, Inc. | |
| TÜVAM | TÜV SUD America, Inc. | |
| UL | UL LLC | |

Note: this list does not include organizations that are no longer recognized. For organizations whose recognition has been terminated, please refer to this list.
