= 3DMark =

Computer benchmarking tool

- Developer(s): MadOnion.com (1998–2001); Remedy Entertainment (1998–2001); Futuremark (2002–2018); UL (2018–present)
- Initial release: October 28, 1998; 26 years ago
- Stable release: v2.29.8294 / September 10, 2024; 11 months ago
- Engine: MAX-FX (2000–2002)
- Platform: Microsoft Windows
- Website: www.3dmark.com

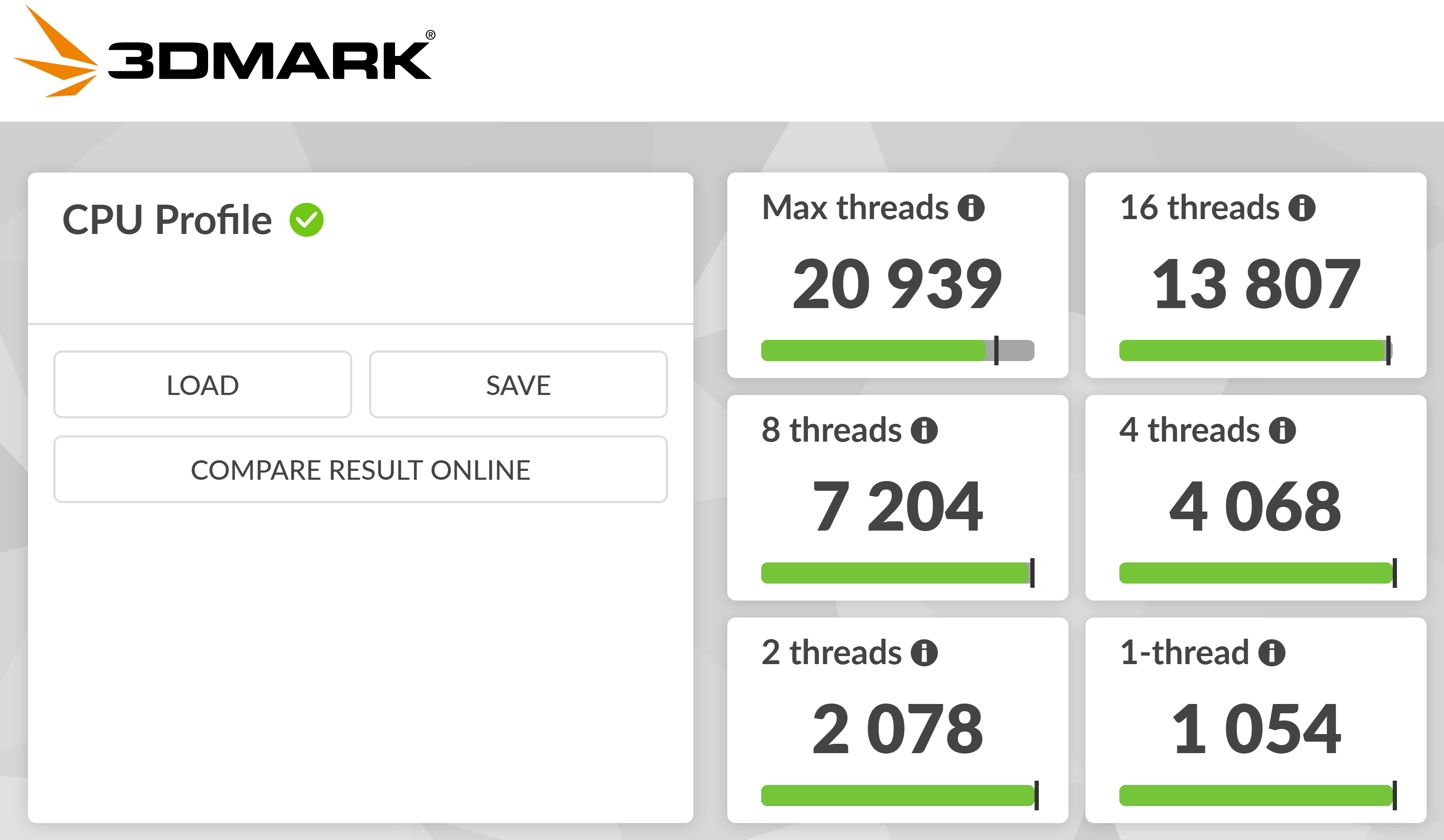
Result after a CPU benchmark ("CPU Profile")

3DMark is a computer benchmarking tool created and developed by UL (formerly Futuremark), to determine the performance of a computer's 3D graphic rendering and CPU workload processing capabilities. Running 3DMark produces a 3DMark score, with higher numbers indicating better performance. The 3DMark measurement unit is intended to give a normalized means for comparing different PC hardware configurations (mostly graphics processing units and central processing units), which proponents such as gamers and overclocking enthusiasts assert is indicative of end-user performance capabilities.

Many versions of 3DMark have been released since 1998. Scores cannot be compared across versions as each test is based on a specific version of the DirectX API. 3DMark 11 and earlier versions, being no longer suitable to test modern hardware, have been made available as freeware by providing keys to unlock the full version on the UL website.

== Versions ==
Version	Description	Released	Operating system	DirectX API	Support status
3DMark99	The first 3DMark was one of the first 3D benchmarks to be aimed directly at the 3D gaming community, rather offering a generic overview of a PC's capabilities. The graphics tests use an early version of Remedy Entertainment's MAX-FX engine, which was later used in the game Max Payne.	October 26, 1998	Windows 95; Windows 98	DirectX 6.0	Discontinued after the release of 3DMark99 MAX
3DMark99 MAX	3DMark99 MAX is a content update to 3DMark99.	March 8, 1999	Windows 95; Windows 98	DirectX 6.1	Unsupported
3DMark2000	The second generation 3DMark, making use of key features from DirectX 7 (such as hardware-accelerated transform and lighting).	December 6, 1999	Windows 95 Windows 98 Windows 98 SE Windows 2000	DirectX 7	Unsupported
3DMark2001	The third generation 3DMark and the first 3D benchmark that supports DirectX 8, using key features such as vertex shaders and pixel shaders, and point sprites.	March 13, 2001	Windows 98; Windows 98 SE; Windows ME; Windows 2000; Windows XP	DirectX 8.0	Discontinued after the release of 3DMark2001 SE
3DMark2001 SE	3DMark2001 Second Edition is an updated version of the third generation 3DMark2001 (the core benchmark tests are as in 3DMark2001, but there is an additional Feature test and broader hardware support). 3DMark2001 SE is the last version of 3DMark to use the MAX-FX engine.	February 12, 2002	Windows 98; Windows 98 SE; Windows ME; Windows 2000; Windows XP	DirectX 8.1	Unsupported
3DMark03	The fourth generation 3DMark. It is the first version that supports Microsoft DirectX 9.0 and introduces several new features. The graphics tests cover a range of rendering techniques and DirectX 9 features, expanding on a similar system used in 3DMark2001. 3DMark03 does not use a 3rd party engine for any of the tests; light DirectX wrappers are used instead. The final score is a weighted sum of the game tests. The results of CPU and other tests are not taken into account. As a complete package, 3DMark03 consists of: 4 game tests: GT1: Wings of Fury – SM1.1 vertex shaders are used alongside fixed function pixel processing.; GT2: Battle of Proxycon – SM1.1 vertex shaders / SM1.4 or 1.1 pixel shaders / stencil shadows; GT3: Trolls' Lair – SM1.1 vertex shaders / SM1.4 or 1.1 pixel shaders / stencil shadows; GT4: Mother Nature – SM1.x and SM2.0 vertex and pixel shaders; 2 CPU tests – low resolution versions of GT1 and GT3, using software vertex shaders to provide the CPU load; 4 Feature tests: Single and multi-texturing fillrate – fixed function rendering; Vertex shader – SM1.1 vertex and pixel shaders; Pixel shader 2.0 – procedural texturing; Ragtroll – ragdoll physics and SM1.1 rendering; Sound tests – a sequence of graphics tests that uses 0, 24 and 60 sound sources	February 11, 2003	Windows 98; Windows 98 SE; Windows ME; Windows 2000; Windows XP	DirectX 9.0	Unsupported
3DMark05	The fifth generation 3DMark. Like 3DMark03, it is based on DirectX 9 but all of the graphics tests require a minimum hardware support of Shader Model 2.0. While the tests only make use of Shader Model 2.0, by default the highest compilation profile supported by the hardware is used, including 3.0. The final score is a geometric mean weighting the game tests equally. The CPU results are not taken into account. In the free version only the part 1, "Return to Proxycon", of the demo is shown now.	September 29, 2004	Windows 2000; Windows XP (SP2)	DirectX 9.0(c)	Unsupported
3DMark06	The sixth generation 3DMark. The three game tests, renamed "graphics tests", from 3DMark05 were carried over and updated, and a fourth new test "Deep Freeze" was added. The scoring formula was changed to incorporate CPU tests results: "For the first time in its history, the CPU result affects the final 3DMark score. This was done due to the fact that there are more and more games using complex AI algorithms and complex physics calculations." Some of the graphics tests have the following features: HDR rendering; Shadow mapping is used for all objects (specifically cascaded shadow mapping, with the depth textures filtered via hardware percentage-closer filtering (PCF)); Water surfaces are created using pixel shaders with HDR refraction, HDR reflection, depth fog and Gerstner wave functions; Atmospheric effects are generated via the use of heterogeneous fog, light scattering and cloud blending; Material surfaces use either Blinn-Phong shading model or Strauss lighting model and subsurface scattering in some cases; The CPU tests in 3DMark06 are different from those found in previous 3DMark versions – instead of using software vertex shading to provide the CPU workload, path-finding, physics and engine routines are used instead, across multiple threads. The free version only shows the part 1, "Return to Proxycon", of the demo.	January 18, 2006	Windows XP; Windows Vista; Windows 7 Windows 8 Windows 8.1; Windows 10	DirectX 9.0c	Unsupported
3DMark Vantage	Futuremark released 3DMark Vantage on April 28, 2008. It is a benchmark based upon DirectX 10, and therefore will only run under Windows Vista (Service Pack 1 is stated as a requirement) and Windows 7. Unlike all of the previous versions there is no demo mode in 3DMark Vantage. Initially the 3DMark Vantage range included a free trial which allowed a single run, the Basic Edition priced at US$6.95 and the Advanced Edition priced at US$19.95. On March 15, 2011 Futuremark released an update for 3DMark Vantage that discontinued the trial edition and made the Basic Edition free to download.	April 28, 2008	Windows Vista; Windows 7 Windows 8 Windows 8.1; Windows 10	DirectX 10	Unsupported; no longer receiving updates other than SystemInfo
3DMark 11	3DMark 11 made extensive use of all the new features in DirectX 11 including tessellation, compute shaders and multi-threading. It was released on December 7, 2010. 3DMark 11 included four Graphics tests – Deep Sea 1 & 2, High Temple 1 & 2 – for measuring GPU performance, a Physics test measuring CPU performance, and a Combined test targeting CPU and GPU performance. 3DMark 11 included a Demo that adds a soundtrack to the visual content.	December 7, 2010	Windows Vista; Windows 7 Windows 8 Windows 8.1; Windows 10	DirectX 11	Unsupported; no longer receiving updates other than SystemInfo
3DMark	Development of a new version of 3DMark was announced on 14 November 2011 with the final product, simply named 3DMark, released on February 4, 2013. Scores from Windows, Android and iOS can be compared making this version of 3DMark the first to enable cross-platform performance comparisons. Unlike previous versions, 3DMark features separate benchmark tests with each producing its own score. Ice Storm is a DirectX 11 feature level 9 / OpenGL ES 2.0 test targeting smartphones, tablets and entry-level PCs. Ice Storm Extreme is a variant of Ice Storm that uses more demanding settings to provide a suitable test for high-end mobile devices. Sling Shot is a mobile-only test introduced in March 2015 for Android and iOS, which is aimed at recent mobile devices and flagship phones. Cloud Gate is a DirectX 11 feature level 10 test for typical home PC and notebooks. Sky Diver is a DirectX 11 test aimed at gaming laptops and mid-range PCs that cannot achieve double-digit frame rates in the more demanding Fire Strike test. Night Raid is a DirectX 12 test designed for systems using integrated graphics, such as tablets, laptops, and desktops lacking dedicated graphics hardware. Fire Strike is a DirectX 11 test for gaming PCs. Fire Strike Extreme is a variant of Fire Strike used to test high-performance gaming PCs with multiple GPUs. Fire Strike Ultra is yet another variant of Fire Strike, which is meant to test enthusiast-grade PCs that are able to game at 4K resolution. Time Spy is a DirectX 12 test added in July 2016. DirectX 12 is only available in Windows 10 and newer, so the test is not available on older OS versions. As with Fire Strike Extreme, Time Spy Extreme is a variant of Time Spy used to test high-end gaming PCs.	February 4, 2013 (Windows); April 2, 2013 (Android); September 9, 2013 (iOS); October 14, 2013 (Windows RT)	Windows Vista; Windows 7 Windows 8 Windows 8.1; Windows 10 Windows 11; Windows RT; Android iOS	DirectX 11 with Direct 3D feature levels 9, 10 and 11. Time Spy test – DirectX 12 with feature level 11_0 supported	Supported
3DMark Port Royal	3DMark Port Royal is to test and compare the real-time ray tracing performance of any graphics card.	January 8, 2019	Windows 10 October Update	DirectX Raytracing	Supported
3DMARK Steel Nomad	Steel Nomad is the official successor to Time Spy.	May 21, 2024	Windows 10; Windows 11; macOS; Linux; Android; iOS	DirectX 12; DirectX Raytracing; Vulkan; OpenGL; Metal	Supported

== See also ==
- Benchmark (computing)
- PCMark
- Futuremark
