= PCMark =

Type of computer benchmarking tool

PCMark is a computer benchmark tool developed by UL (formerly Futuremark) for Microsoft Windows operating systems to test the performance of a PC at the system and component level. In most cases, the tests in PCMark are designed to represent typical home user workloads. Running PCMark produces a score with higher numbers indicating better performance. Several versions of PCMark have been released. Scores cannot be compared across versions since each includes different tests.

== Versions ==
| Version | Description | Released | Operating System | Status |
|---|---|---|---|---|
| PCMark2002 | PCMark2002 is the first unified benchmark from Futuremark, suited for benchmarking PCs running Microsoft Windows operating systems. It is designed to test normal home and office PC usage. PCMark2002 includes: CPU Performance Testing; Memory Performance Testing; HDD Performance Testing; System Crunch Testing; Windows XP 2D Testing; Video Encoding and Decoding Performance Testing; DVD Playback Quality Testing; Laptop Battery Endurance Testing | March 12, 2002 | Windows XP; Windows 2000; Windows Millennium; Windows 98 SE; Windows 98 | Unsupported |
| PCMark04 | PCMark04 is the first multitasking benchmark from Futuremark. It features both system and component level benchmarking. System level benchmarking produces a measure of the PC’s overall performance. Component level benchmarking isolates the performance of individual components, such as the CPU, memory, graphics subsystem, and hard disk. PCMark04 includes the ability to create custom benchmarks tailored to a user's specific needs.: PCMark test, a system level test; CPU test; Memory test; Graphics test; HDD test | November 25, 2003 | Windows XP; Windows 2000 | Unsupported |
| PCMark05 | The tests in PCMark05 are divided into different test suites depending on the part of the PC they measure.: System Test Suite; CPU Test Suite; Memory Test Suite; Graphics Test Suite; HDD Test Suite | June 28, 2005 | Windows Vista; Windows XP | Unsupported |
| PCMark Vantage | PCMark Vantage is capable of benchmarking Microsoft Windows Vista and 7, and is suited for benchmarking multimedia home entertainment systems, laptops, dedicated workstations, and high-end gaming rigs. The PCMark Suite contains various single- and multi-threaded CPU, Graphics and HDD test sets, primarily focused for Windows Vista. Consumer Scenario Suites are pre-defined selections of test sets that measure the system’s performance in respective Windows Vista Consumer Scenarios. The scenarios provide: PCMark Score; PCMark Memories Score; PCMark TV and Movies Score; PCMark Gaming Score; PCMark Music Score; PCMark Communications Score; PCMark Productivity Score; PCMark HDD Score | October 18, 2007 | Windows 7 (8/8.1 with limitations); Windows Vista | Unsupported |
| PCMark 7 | PCMark 7 contains 7 separate tests to give different views of system performance.: The PCMark test measures overall system performance and returns an official PCMark score.; The Lightweight test measures the capabilities of entry level systems unable to run the full PCMark suite.; The Entertainment test measures system performance in entertainment, media and gaming scenarios.; The Creativity test measures performance in typical creativity scenarios involving images and video.; The Productivity test measures system performance scenarios using the Internet and office applications.; The Computation test contains workloads that isolate the computation performance of the system.; The Storage test contains workloads that isolate the performance of the PC’s storage system. | May 12, 2011 | Windows 8/8.1; Windows 7 | Unsupported |
| PCMark 8 | PCMark 8 is a Windows system benchmark. Unlike previous versions, PCMark 8 includes battery life testing and benchmarks using 3rd party applications from Adobe Creative Suite and Microsoft Office. PCMark 8 includes five main benchmark tests and the ability to run any single workload individually.: The Home benchmark includes workloads that reflect common tasks for a typical home user.; The Creative benchmark includes workloads typical of advanced home computer users.; The Work benchmark test includes a set of workloads that reflect common tasks for an office environment.; The Applications benchmark measures system performance using applications from Adobe Creative Suite and Microsoft Office.; The Storage benchmark is a component level test for measuring the performance of SSDs, HDDs and hybrid drives. | June 4, 2013 (Professional Edition) October 21, 2013 (Advanced and Basic Editions) | Windows 8/8.1; Windows 7 | Supported |
| PCMark 10 | PCMark 10 is a system benchmark for Windows PCs with a focus on modern office tasks. It offers a variety of workloads categorised into four groups. The Essentials group includes web browsing, video conferencing, and app start-up time. The Productivity group includes tests based on spreadsheets and writing. The Digital Content Creation group includes photo editing, video editing, and a rendering and visualization test. The final group, Gaming, includes tests for real-time graphics and physics.: The PCMark 10 benchmark tests performance using the Essentials, Productivity, and Digital Content Creation groups.; The PCMark 10 Express benchmark test includes the Essentials and Productivity groups.; The PCMark 10 Extended benchmark test includes the Essentials, Productivity, Digital Content Creation and Gaming groups. | June 6, 2017 (Professional Edition) June 22, 2017 (Advanced and Basic Editions) | Windows 10; Windows 8/8.1; Windows 7 SP1 64-bit Windows 11 | Supported |

== Controversy ==
In a 2008 Ars Technica article, a VIA Nano gained significant performance after its CPUID changed to Intel. This was because Intel compilers create conditional code that uses more advanced instructions for CPUs that identify as Intel.

== See also ==
- Benchmark (computing)
- 3DMark
- Futuremark
