= TÜV =

Independent service companies from Germany and Austria

TÜV Nord

TÜV Rheinland

TÜV SÜD

TÜV Saarland

TÜV Thüringen

TÜV Austria

TÜVs (German pronunciation: [ˈtʏf]; short for German: Technischer Überwachungsverein, English: Technical Inspection Association) are internationally active, independent service companies from Germany and Austria that test, inspect and certify technical systems, facilities and objects of all kinds in order to minimize hazards and prevent damages.

The TÜV companies are organized into three large holding companies: TÜV Nord, TÜV Rheinland and TÜV SÜD (with TÜV Hessen), along with the smaller independent companies TÜV Thüringen, TÜV Saarland and TÜV Austria.

== History ==
With the increasing number and efficiency of steam engines during the Industrial Revolution, there had been more and more accidents caused by exploding (or more precisely, bursting) boilers. After the explosion of the boiler at the Mannheim Aktienbrauerei in January 1865, the idea was pursued there to subject boilers to regular inspections on a voluntary basis, as was already the case in Great Britain. Twenty boiler owners in Baden joined in the plans and finally founded the Gesellschaft zur Überwachung und Versicherung von Dampfkesseln ("Society for the Supervision and Insurance of Steam Boilers") on 6 January 1866 in the rooms of the Mannheim Stock Exchange. It was the first inspection society on the European mainland. Other German states and regions followed suit.

These independent regional monitoring organizations in the form of associations were so successful in accident prevention that, from 1871, membership in such an association exempted them from inspection by a state inspector. The regional Dampfkessel-Überwachungs- und Revisions-Vereine (DÜV), as self-help organizations of steam boiler operators, were thus an early example of a very successful privatization of previously state inspections. Because they were so successful in preventing accidents in the rapidly developing field of steam boiler technology, they were later also entrusted with safety inspections in other technical fields, including the periodic testing of motor vehicles as well as driver's license testing.

All TÜV groups that emerged from these common roots use the "TÜV" brand and a regional suffix (for example, TÜV SÜD, TÜV Rheinland, TÜV Nord, TÜV Saarland, TÜV Thüringen, TÜV Austria) in their names. They compete with each other and with other market players in some areas (see above).

The individual TÜVs became multinational corporations with time, and came to provide services to industry, governments, individuals, and non-profit groups. During the 1980s and 1990s, deregulation led to competition in the German inspection and certification industry, and further deregulation occurred at the end of 2007.

In 2007, TÜV Nord and TÜV SÜD agreed to merge, which would have created a company with 18,000 employees and sales of around 1.8 billion euros; however the companies called off the merger that same year, citing potential difficulties with integration as well as restrictions that would have been required under antitrust law. In 2008, TÜV SÜD and TÜV Rheinland agreed to merge which would have created the second largest testing services company in the world, behind SGS S.A.; the combined company would have had around 25,000 employees and 2.2 billion euros in income. These plans were abandoned by August again due to antitrust concerns. TÜV Nord had more than 11,000 employees stationed globally as of 2020.

== Responsibilities and structure ==
All TÜVs perform sovereign tasks in the fields of vehicle monitoring, driver licensing and equipment and product safety. In addition, TÜVs function as notified bodies in Europe for medical device regulation.

Every company that uses the word "TÜV" in its name is at least 25.1% owned by a "Technischer Überwachungs-Verein e. V." (Technical Inspection Association), which is a non-governmental organization of the German business community and has been entrusted by the state with the specified sovereign tasks ("TÜV Convention").

As a result of deregulation and liberalization, the former regional responsibility in Germany has been abolished in most areas of work. In these areas, as well as in the unregulated sector, the companies operate independently on the market and compete with each other. In many areas such as product certification and certification of management systems, they are represented worldwide by subsidiaries.

Organizations that imitate TÜV have also established themselves outside the German-speaking world. TÜV India, which is a subsidiary of TÜV Nord, has been operating in India since 1989. TÜV offices have also been operating in Turkey since 2007. The operator is TÜVTÜRK, a subsidiary of TÜV SÜD.

=== TÜV Hessen ===
TÜV Hessen (TÜV Technische Überwachung Hessen GmbH) is based in Darmstadt. According to its origins, the company is a purely technical testing organization, but with its focus on testing and certification now operates in a broad field within the service industry. It currently employs around 1350 people and generated annual sales of around €157 million in fiscal 2019. TÜV Hessen has been 55% owned by TÜV Süd AG and 45% by the state of Hesse since 1999.

=== TÜV SÜD ===
TÜV SÜD AG is a management holding company with 74.9 percent of the shares owned by TÜV SÜD e.V. (registered association) and 25.1 percent owned by the TÜV SÜD Foundation. In 2021, it generated annual sales of €2.7 billion with 25,000+ employees. As of June 2022, TÜV SÜD listed more than 1,000 locations throughout Germany, Europe, America, and Asia. Around 40 percent of sales are generated abroad.

=== TÜV Nord ===
TÜV NORD AG is based in Hanover. Its main tasks are testing and certification in the business areas of industry, automotive, and human resources and education. As a stock corporation, the company was founded in 2004. The shares of the company are held by TÜV NORD e. V. (36.1%), RWTÜV e. V. (36.1%) and TÜV Hannover/Sachsen-Anhalt e. V. (27.8%).

=== TÜV Saarland ===
TÜV Saarland emerged from the Pfälzischer Dampfkessel-Revisions-Verein (Palatinate Steam Boiler Auditing Association) founded in 1871 and is headquartered in Sulzbach. The chairman of the Board of TÜV Saarland is Thomas Klein. TÜV Saarland Holding GmbH is 74.9 percent owned by TÜV Saarland e.V. and 25.1 percent by the TÜV Saarland Foundation. The managing directors of TÜV Saarland Holding GmbH are Carsten Schubert (spokesman) and Thorsten Greiner.

=== TÜV Thüringen ===
TÜV Thüringen is headquartered in Erfurt. TÜV Thüringen is set up as a group of companies and competes with the other testing organizations. The TÜV Thüringen group of companies has its main focus in central Germany and operates throughout Germany and worldwide. It has more than 1,000 employees at ten locations in Germany as well as numerous automotive testing facilities in twelve countries.

=== TÜV Rheinland ===
TÜV Rheinland AG is based in Cologne. TÜV Rheinland operates as a technical testing organization in the areas of safety, efficiency and quality. Chairman of the executive board of TÜV Rheinland AG is Michael Fübi, chairman of the supervisory board is Michael Hüther. The sole shareholder of TÜV Rheinland AG is TÜV Rheinland Berlin Brandenburg Pfalz e. V. With 19,924 employees, TÜV Rheinland generated sales of 1.97 billion euros and earnings before interest and taxes of 130.6 million euros in 2017. In terms of sales, 45 percent was attributable to business outside Germany. 11,420 employees work outside Germany, 8,504 in Germany. DIN CERTCO is the certification body of TÜV Rheinland Group and is the certification body for the issuance of the DIN-Marks and further certification marks.

=== TÜV Austria ===
In Austria, TÜV Austria, which dates back to its foundation as a monitoring association in 1872, has evolved into the internationally active TÜV Austria Group.

== The brand "TÜV" ==
The "TÜV" brand is a trademark protected for the benefit of these testing organizations and the VdTÜV. It is an asset of the TÜV testing companies.

"TÜV" became known to the general public primarily through the general inspection. In Germany, the term "TÜV" is informally used to denote the compulsory biennial or triennial vehicle inspection procedure (similar to the term "MOT" in the United Kingdom, e.g., you take your car "to the TÜV", even though vehicle inspections are now also often inspected by another organization such as Dekra, KÜS or GTÜ, since the former monopoly for this inspection has long been dissolved).

In addition, "TÜV-geprüft" colloquially means a seal of quality for technical testing by a TÜV company (see above). The designation "TÜV-tested" may only be used by a technical inspection association or a subsidiary. Anything else would be misleading consumers or unfair competition. This seal of quality is also increasingly being abused by falsification.[3]

Because "the TÜV" enjoys a high reputation for neutrality and expertise in Germany and Austria, but now also worldwide, and has a high degree of recognition, the designation is applied in colloquial language to many social problem areas and grievances when there are calls for control and transparency (e.g. "Bureaucracy TÜV", "School TÜV", "Event TÜV").

== TÜV Association ==
The TÜV Association or TÜV-Verband e. V. in German (formerly VdTÜV or Verband der TÜV e. V.) represents the interests of the Technical Inspection Associations (TÜV) in Germany and Europe vis a vis politics, authorities, economy and the public. The association has its headquarters in Berlin and also maintains an EU representation in Brussels.

The aim of the TÜV Association is to improve the technical and digital safety of vehicles, products, systems and services through independent assessments. Together with its members, the TÜV Association pursues the goal of maintaining the high level of technical safety in our society and creating trust for the digital world. To achieve this, the experts of the TÜV Association are involved in the further development of standards and regulations. Currently, the main focus is on strengthening digital security and meeting the growing demands for sustainability in our society.

Since June 2024, Michael Fübi, chairman of the Board of Management of TÜV Rheinland, has been chairman of the TÜV Association. The chairmanship rotates every two years. Since 2017, Joachim Bühler has been managing director of the TÜV Association.

The TÜV Association has six main members. In addition, there are two industry members and five associate members.

=== Main members ===
- TÜV SÜD
- TÜV Hessen
- TÜV Nord
- TÜV Thüringen
- TÜV Saarland
- TÜV Rheinland
- TÜV Austria

== Scandals ==
Over the years, there have been various scandals regarding the services provided by the different TÜVs.

=== Brazilian dam disaster ===
TÜV SÜD audited and certified Vale, a company that was involved in the 2015 Mariana dam disaster. In 2019, the Brumadinho dam disaster occurred. In October 2019, five Brazilians who lost close family members in the disaster and two NGOs filed a law infringement complaint against TÜV SÜD, alleging that it was jointly responsible for the deaths and environmental damage(s). The company has denied the allegations.

On 25 January 2019, a recently inspected tailings dam collapsed, killing 270 people, 259 of whom were officially confirmed as dead, whereas 11 others, whose bodies had not yet been found, were reported as missing. The Brumadinho dam disaster released a mudflow that advanced over houses in a rural area near the city. Brazilian authorities issued arrest warrants for two engineers of TÜV SÜD, contracted to inspect the dam. Brazilian prosecutors announced, on 21 January 2020, that Vale, TÜV SÜD, and 16 individuals would be charged in relation to the dam disaster.

In 2020, Brazilian prosecutors announced their plans to file charges against Vale S.A. and its auditor TÜV SÜD as well as many other individuals.

=== Deficient breast implants ===
In 2013, TÜV Rheinland was held liable by a French court to 1600 women whose breast implants had ruptured; the implants were made by Poly Implant Prothèse with TÜV Rheinland having certified the manufacturing process.

== Media references ==
- The organisation was mentioned in the song "Sanifair Millionär" by the German band Blond.

== See also ==
- CE marking
- Cybersecurity standards
- Explosion protection
- Functional safety
- Nationally Recognized Testing Laboratory
- Security
