= National Sanitation Foundation =

American standardization organization

- NSF Certification Mark

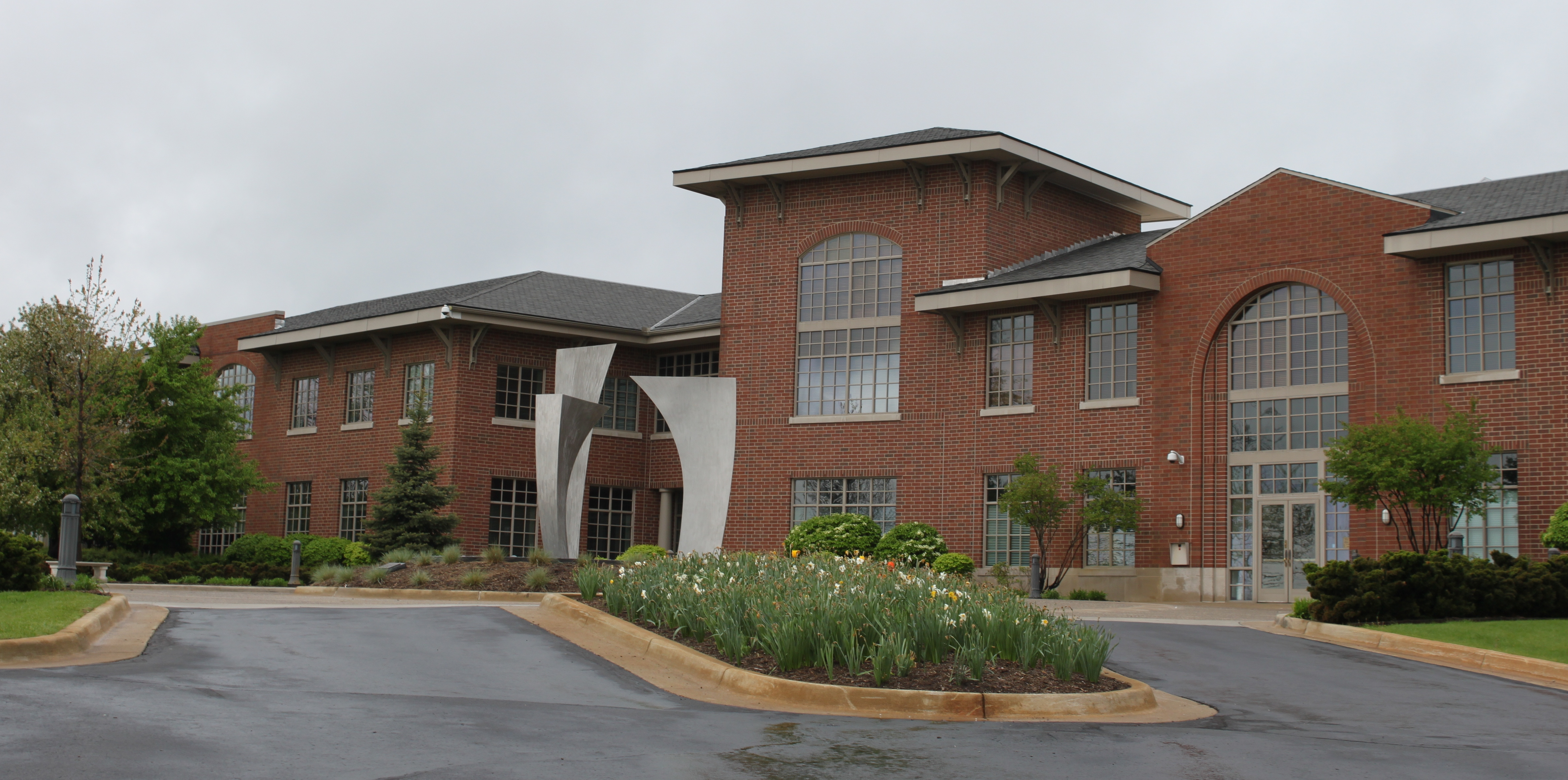
- NSF International headquarters in Ann Arbor Charter Township, Michigan
- Abbreviation: NSF
- Formation: 1944
- Type: Testing, inspection, certification, training, and consulting
- Legal status: Not-for-profit
- Purpose: Improve and protect human health worldwide.
- Headquarters: Ann Arbor Charter Township, Michigan, United States
- President and CEO: Pedro Sancha
- Staff: 1,200 (2011)
- Website: nsf.org

NSF is a public health nonprofit organization headquartered in Ann Arbor Charter Township, Michigan, United States. It tests and certifies foods, water, and consumer products. It also facilitates the development of standards for these products, labeling products it has certified to meet these standards with the NSF mark.

NSF is accredited by the American National Standards Institute (ANSI) and the Standards Council of Canada.

== History ==
NSF was founded in 1944 as the National Sanitation Foundation by the University of Michigan School of Public Health, in an attempt to standardize requirements around sanitation and food safety. The first standards developed by the NSF set sanitation requirements on soda fountain and luncheonette equipment.

=== Acquisitions ===
In October 2002, NSF acquired FreshCheck, a food microbiological and sanitation audit company.

In March 2004, NSF acquired Quality Assurance International.

In January 2013, NSF acquired INASSA Group, a Lima, Peru-based company in the industry of quality control, analytical testing, and inspection for seafood.

In October 2025, NSF acquired Cambium Analytica, an analytical testing and development company in the food, beverage, and diet supplement industries.

== Certification ==
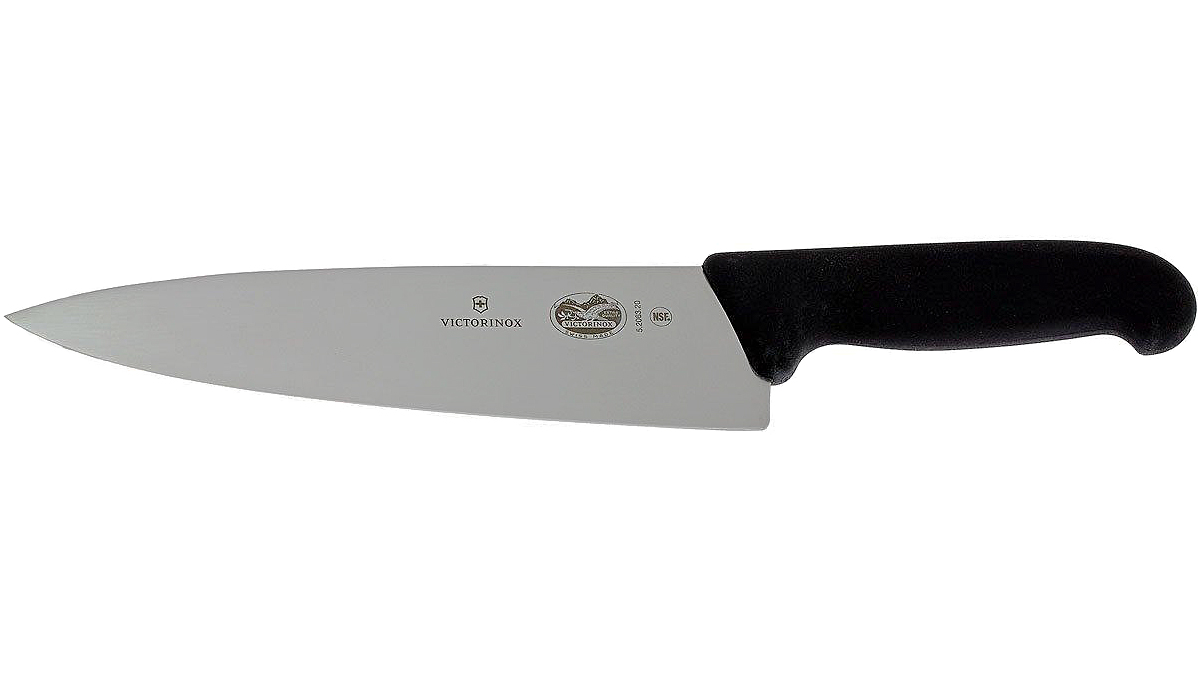
NSF-certified stamped x50CrMov15 stainless steel chef's knife with TPE grip

NSF certifies food equipment, including food preparation and dispensing equipment, ice makers, refrigerators and freezers, dishwashing sinks, vending machines, mobile food carts, and service counters. These certifications are widely recognized internationally.

NSF's Food division also certifies the gluten-freeness and other similar characteristics of products, as well as certifying bottled water and packaged ice.

NSF also certifies dietary supplements through a standard it facilitated the development of adopted by ANSI (NSF/American National Standards Institute Standard 173), testing for safe levels of contaminants and that the ingredients on supplements match their labels. As of 2002 it competed in this with the United States Pharmacopeia certification mark.

NSF also develops standards for and certifies water quality. As of 2024, the US Environmental Protection Agency (EPA) sets limits on drinking water contaminants based on standards set by the NSF.

NSF Consumer Products Division tests and certifies consumer products and appliances used in and around the home.

== Laboratories ==
NSF maintains laboratories in North America, South America, Europe, and China. NSF's laboratories are accredited by the Occupational Safety and Health Administration. NSF laboratories are ISO 17025 certified (testing and calibration).

The chairman of the Board of Directors, is the retired Chief Operations Officer and Executive Vice President of the McDonald's Corporation. In March 2022, Pedro Sancha, formerly of Ecolab and Shell, was named as President and chief executive officer.
