= AC power plugs and sockets =

Connector to mains electricity

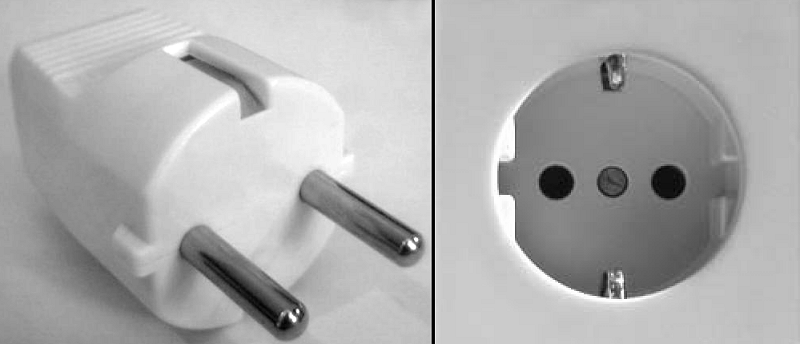
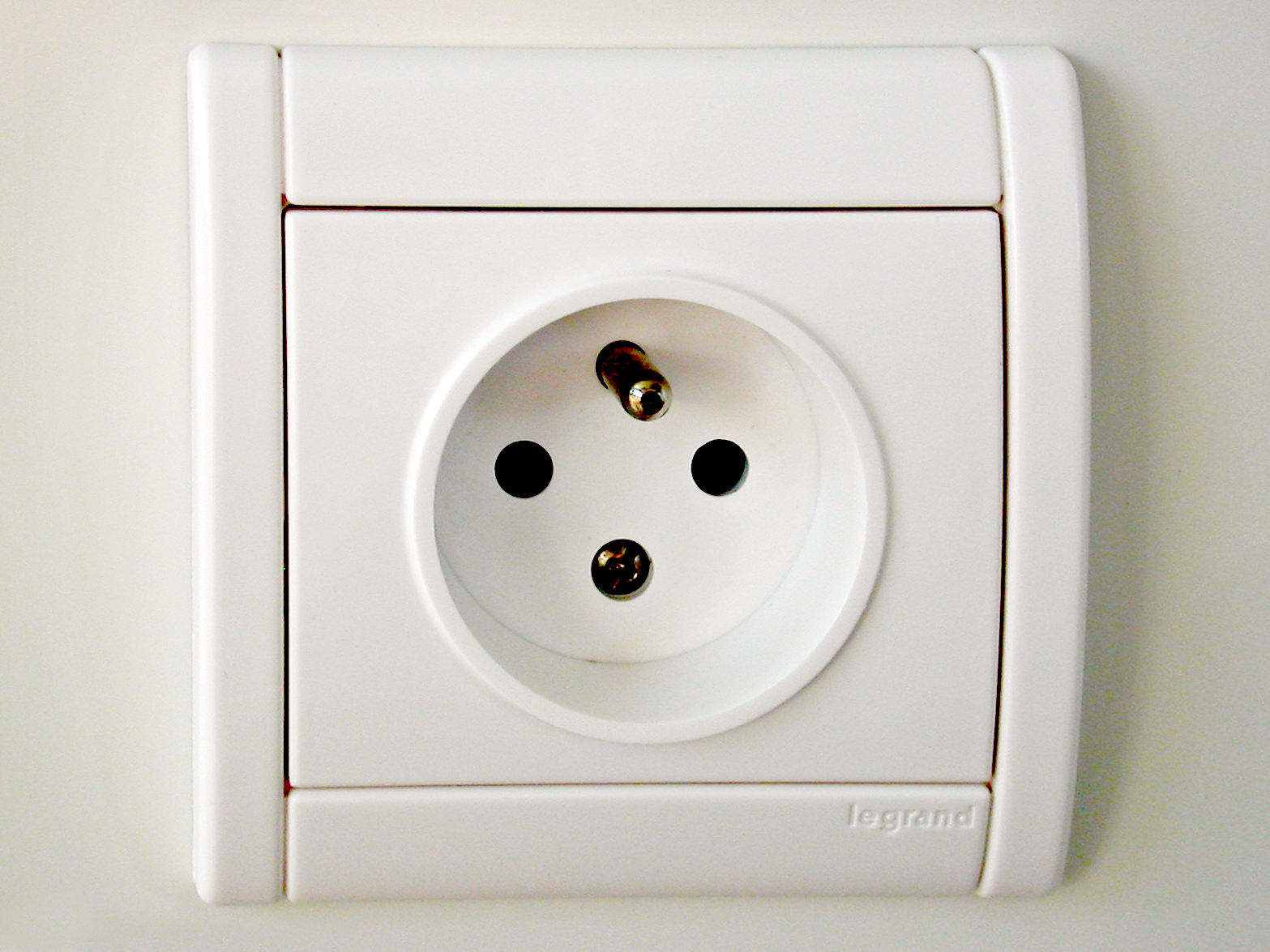
Plugs and sockets may sometimes combine male and female contacts. Clockwise from top left: CEE 7/4 (Schuko) plug; a matching CEE 7/3 socket with exposed earth (ground) contacts around the circumference; CEE 7/5 (Belgian/French) socket with projecting earth pin

AC power plugs and sockets connect devices to mains electricity to supply them with electrical power. A plug is the connector attached to an electrically operated device, often via a cable. A socket (also known as a receptacle or outlet) is fixed in place, often on the internal walls of buildings, and is connected to an AC electrical circuit. Inserting ("plugging in") the plug into the socket allows the device to draw power from this circuit.

Plugs and wall-mounted sockets for portable appliances became available in the 1880s, to replace connections to light sockets. A proliferation of types were subsequently developed for both convenience and protection from electrical injury. Electrical plugs and sockets differ from one another in voltage and current rating, shape, size, and connector type. Different standard systems of plugs and sockets are used around the world, and many obsolete socket types are still found in older buildings.

Coordination of technical standards has allowed some types of plug to be used across large regions to facilitate the production and import of electrical appliances and for the convenience of travellers. Some multi-standard sockets allow use of several types of plug. Incompatible sockets and plugs may be used with the help of adaptors, though these may not always provide full safety and performance.

== Overview of connections ==
Single-phase sockets have receptacles for two power pins, one to carry the electrical current from the power source to the connected device (called live, line, or phase pin) and another one to carry it back to the power source (called neutral pin). Many sockets have a third receptacle or pin for a safety connection to earth ground. The plug is a male connector, usually with protruding pins that match the receptacles (female contacts) in a socket. Some plugs also have a female contact, used only for the earth ground connection. Typically no energy is supplied to any exposed pins or terminals on the socket, hence the power pins are always part of the plug rather than the socket. In addition to the recessed contacts of the energised socket, plug and socket systems often have other safety features to reduce the risk of electric shock or damage to appliances.

== History ==
When commercial electric power was first introduced in the 1880s, it was used primarily for lighting. Other portable appliances (such as vacuum cleaners, electric fans, smoothing irons, and curling-tong heaters) were connected to light-bulb sockets. As early as 1885 a two-pin plug and wall socket format was available on the British market. By about 1910 the first three-pin earthed (grounded) plugs appeared. Over time other safety improvements were gradually introduced to the market. One of the first national standards for plugs and wall sockets was enacted in 1915 in the UK.

== Safety features ==
Removable AC socket safety cover – demo

=== Protection from accidental contact ===
Designs of plugs and sockets have gradually developed to reduce the risk of electric shock and fire. Plugs are shaped to prevent bodily contact with live parts. Sockets may be recessed and plugs designed to fit closely within the recess to reduce risk of a user contacting the live pins. Contact pins may be sheathed with insulation over part of their length, so as to reduce exposure of energized metal during insertion or removal of the plug. Sockets may have automatic shutters to stop foreign objects from being inserted into energized contacts. Sockets are often set into a surround which prevents accidental contact with the live wires in the wall behind it. Some also have an integrated cover (e.g., a hinged flap) covering the socket itself when not in use, or a switch to turn off the socket.

=== Overcurrent protection ===
Some plugs, particularly the British Type G, have a built-in fuse which breaks the circuit if too much current flows.

=== Earthing (grounding) ===
A third contact for a connection to earth is intended to protect against insulation failure of the connected device. Some early unearthed plug and socket types were revised to include an earthing pin or phased out in favour of earthed types. The plug is often designed so that the earth ground contact connects before the energized circuit contacts. The assigned IEC appliance class is governed by the requirement for earthing or equivalent protection. Class I equipment requires an earth contact in the plug and socket, while Class II equipment is unearthed and protects the user with double insulation.

=== Polarization ===
Where a "neutral" conductor exists in supply wiring, polarization of the plug can improve safety by preserving the distinction in the equipment. For example, appliances may ensure that switches interrupt the live side of the circuit, or can connect the shell of a screw-base lampholder to neutral to reduce electric shock hazard. In some designs, polarized plugs cannot be mated with non-polarized sockets. In most NEMA 1 plugs, for example, the neutral blade is slightly wider than the hot blade, so it can only be inserted one way. Wiring systems where both circuit conductors have a significant potential with respect to earth do not benefit from polarized plugs.

=== Voltage rating of plugs and power cords ===
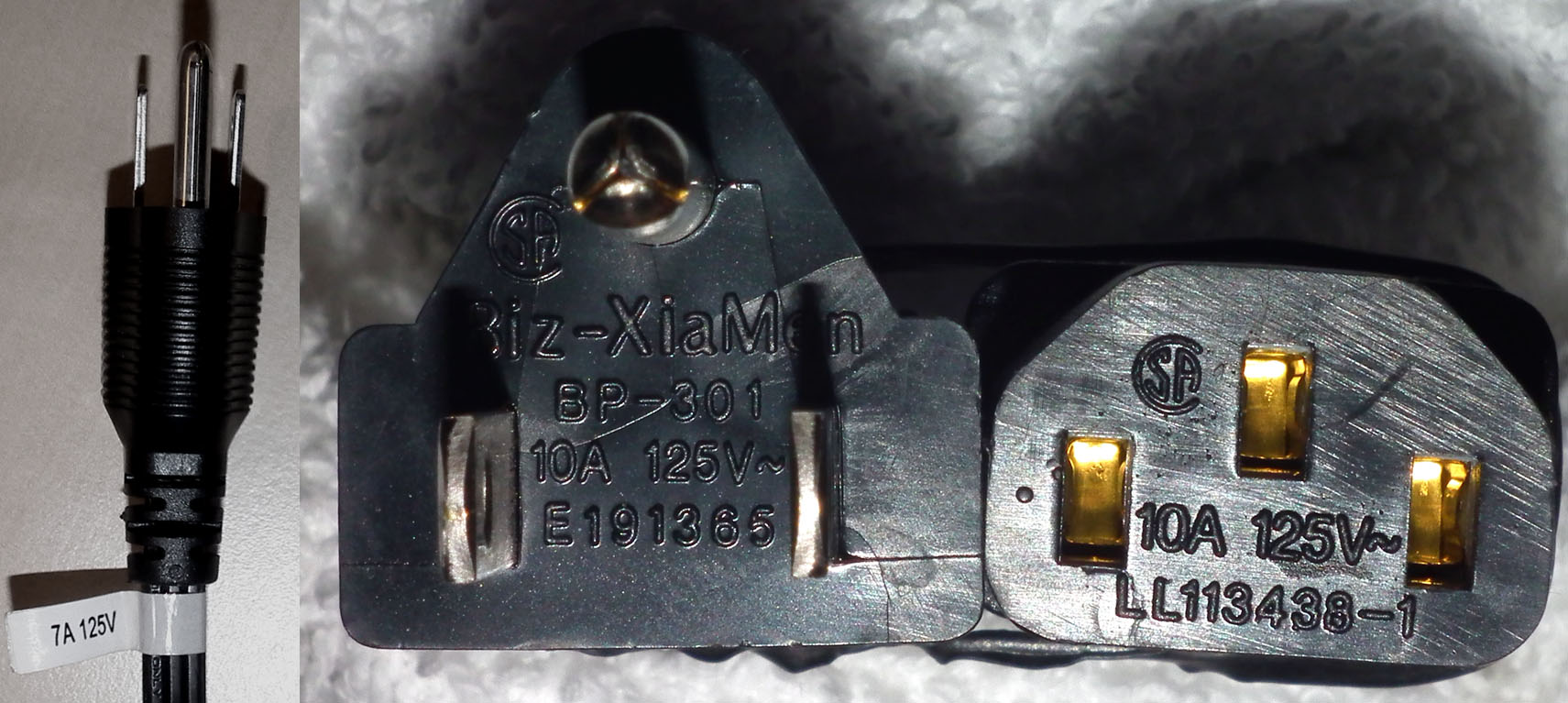
Ratings of NEMA 5-15 (Type B) plug marked on the label (left: 7 A 125 V), engagement face, and IEC 60320 C13 connector at the appliance end of the cord (centre, right: both 10 A 125 V)

Plugs and power cords have a rated voltage and current assigned to them by the manufacturer. Using a plug or power cord that is inappropriate for the load may be a safety hazard. For example, high-current equipment can cause a fire when plugged into an extension cord with a current rating lower than necessary. Sometimes the cords used to plug in dual voltage 120 V / 240 V equipment are rated only for 125 V, so care must be taken by travellers to use only cords with an appropriate voltage rating.

== Extension ==
A plug strip with two USB ports and built-in surge protection

Various methods can be used to increase the number or reach of sockets.

=== Extension cords ===
Extension cords (extension leads) are used for temporary connections when a socket is not within convenient reach of an appliance's power lead. This may be in the form of a single socket on a flexible cable or a power strip with multiple sockets. A power strip may also have switches, surge voltage protection, or overcurrent protection.

=== Multisocket adaptors ===
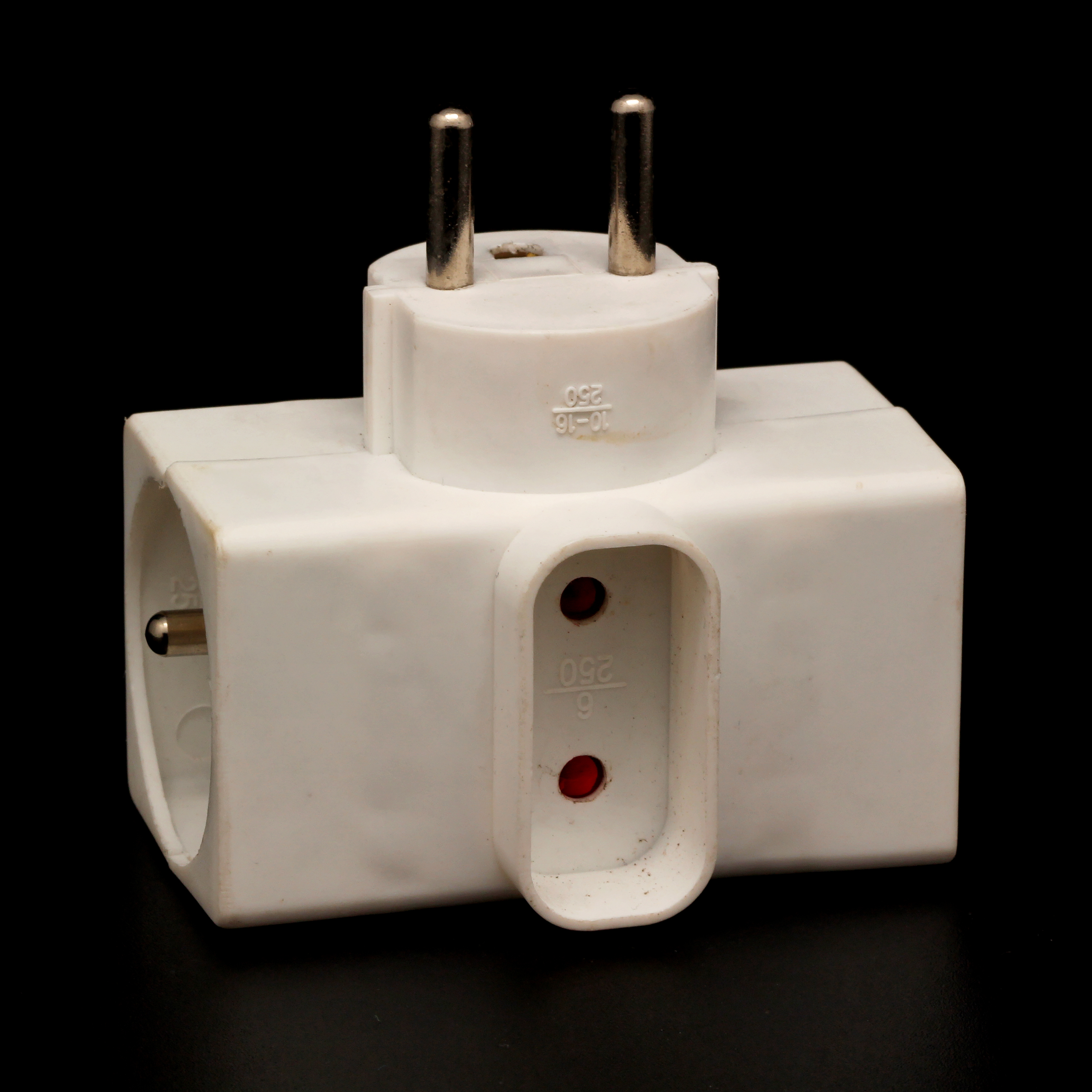
A French CEE 7 adaptor

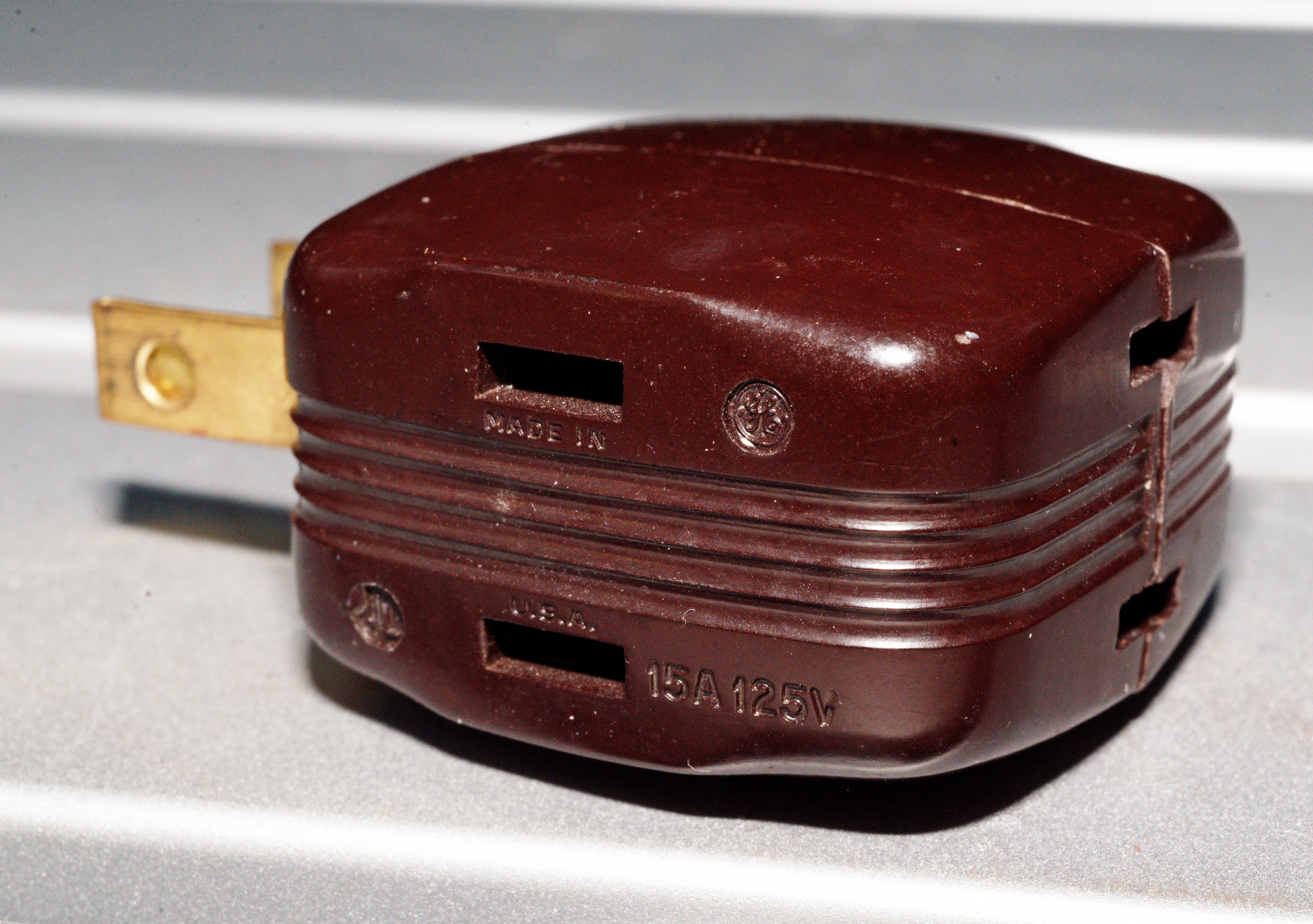
An old US non-polarized multisocket adaptor

Multisocket adaptors (or "splitters") allow the connection of two or more plugs to a single socket. They are manufactured in various configurations, depending on the country and the region in which they are used, with various ratings. This allows connecting more than one electrical consumer item to one single socket and is mainly used for low power devices (TV sets, table lamps, computers, etc.).

They are usually rated for 6 A, 10 A, or 16 A at 250 V or for 15 A or less at 125 V. This is the general rating of the adaptor, and indicates the maximum total load in amperes, regardless of the number of sockets used (for example, if a 16 A 250 V adaptor has four sockets, it would be fine to plug four different devices into it that each consume 2 A as this represents a total load of only 8 A, whereas if only two devices were plugged into it that each consumed 10 A, the combined 20 A load would overload the circuit).

In some countries such adaptors are banned and are not available in shops, as they may lead to fires due to overloading them or can cause excessive mechanical stress to wall-mounted sockets. Adaptors can be made with ceramic, Bakelite, or other plastic bodies.

== Cross-compatibility ==
=== Hybrid and universal sockets ===
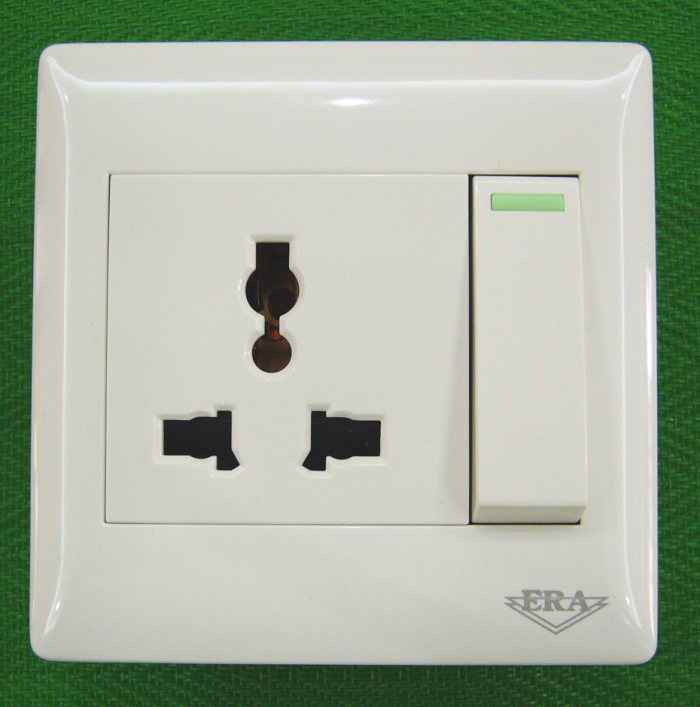
A so-called "universal socket", which meets no official standard but is intended to accept a number of different plug types.

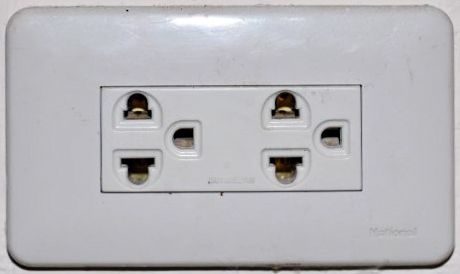
An earthed Thai socket that complies with figure 4 of TIS 166-2549. Although it accepts NEMA plugs, the Thai voltage is 230 V and thus is electrically incompatible with devices designed only for 120 V.

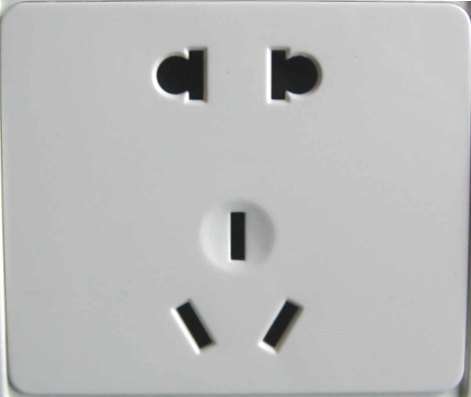
Old Chinese dual socket accepting both unearthed two-pin (upper) and earthed three-pin (lower) plugs.

"Hybrid", "multi-standard", or "universal" sockets are intended to accommodate plugs of two or more types. In some jurisdictions, they violate safety standards for sockets. Safety advocates, the United States Army, and a manufacturer of sockets point out a number of safety issues with universal socket and adaptors, including voltage mismatch, exposure of live pins, lack of proper earth ground connection, or lack of protection from overload or short circuit. Universal sockets may not meet technical standards for durability, plug retention force, temperature rise of components, or other performance requirements, as they are outside the scope of national and international technical standards.

A technical standard may include compatibility of a socket with more than one form of plug. The Thai dual socket is specified in figure 4 of TIS 166-2549 and is designed to accept Thai plugs, and also Type A, B, and C plugs. Chinese dual sockets have both an unearthed socket that accepts A and C plugs and an earthed socket that accepts Type I plugs. Since the 2021 revision of the Chinese standard, the installation of such dual sockets is no longer allowed in China, but they can still be found in many existing installations.

Such Thai or Chinese dual sockets also accept plugs normally fitted to 120 V appliances (e.g. 120 V rated NEMA 1-15 ungrounded plugs). This can cause an electrical incompatibility, since both countries supply residential power at 220–230 V. These dual sockets also accept French and Schuko plugs (Types E and F), but unsafely: no earth contact is established and live pins may be exposed when a plug is partially inserted.

=== Swappable cables and plugs ===
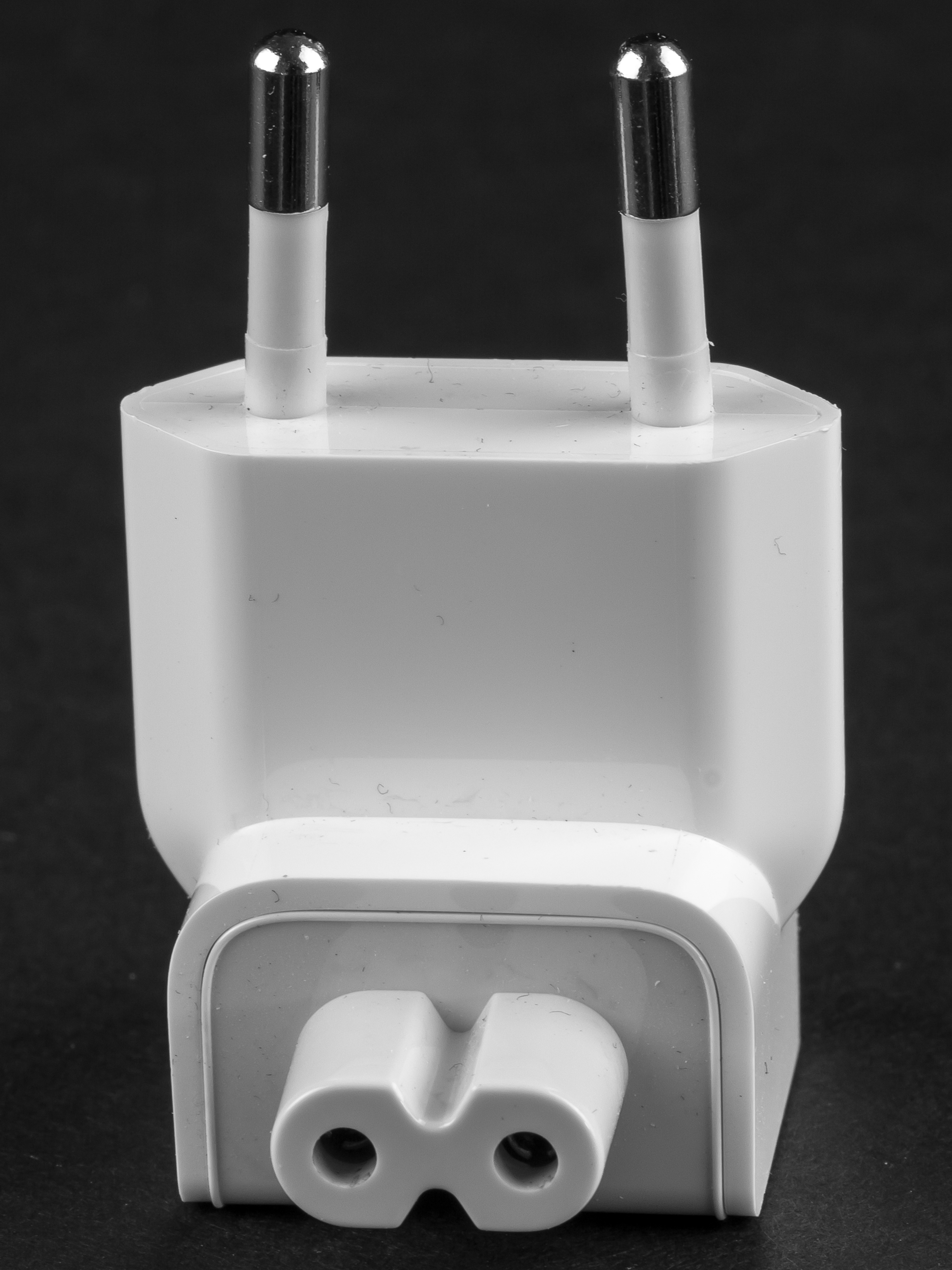
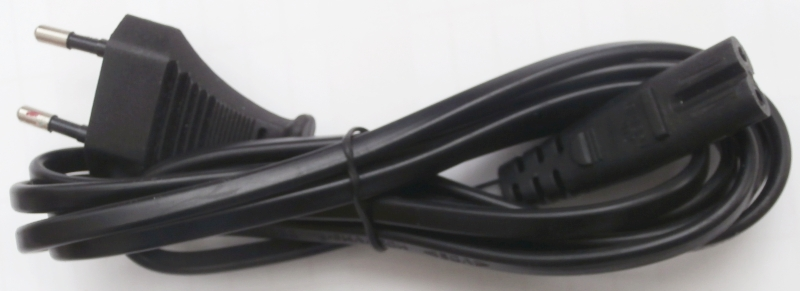
Swappable plug and IEC 60320 C7 cable

Commonly, manufacturers provide an IEC 60320 inlet on an appliance, with a detachable power cord (mains flex lead) and appropriate plug in order to avoid manufacturing whole appliances, with the only difference being the type of plug. Alternatively, the plug itself can often be swappable using standard or proprietary connectors.

=== Travel adaptors ===
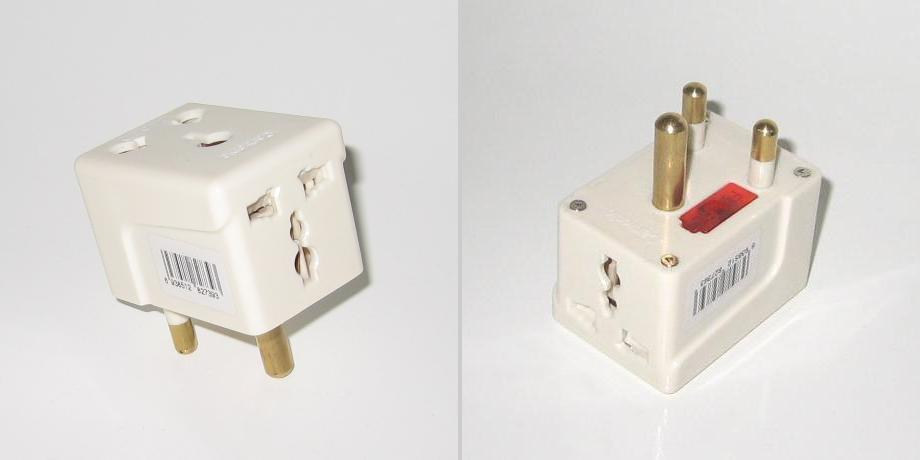
A travel adaptor for "Type M" (16 A SANS 164-1) sockets from South Africa

Adaptors between standards are not included in most standards, and as a result they have no formal quality criteria defined. Physical compatibility does not ensure that the appliance and socket match in frequency or voltage. Adaptors allow travellers to connect devices to foreign sockets, but do not change voltage or frequency. A voltage converter is required for electrical compatibility in places with a different voltage than the device is designed for. Mismatch in frequency between supply and appliances may still cause problems even at the correct voltage. Some appliances have a switch for the selection of voltage. Many modern devices use AC adapters that accept 100–240 V voltage at 50 or 60 Hz, meaning they can be used anywhere in the world as long as a suitable plug adapter is used.

== Standard types in present use ==
Types of power plugs and sockets used by country. (See identification guide.) A • B, A • C • D, M • E, C • F, C • G • H, C • I • J, C • K, C • L, C • N, C

The plugs and sockets used in a given area are regulated by local governments.

The International Electrotechnical Commission (IEC) maintains a guide with letter designations for generally compatible types of plugs, which expands on earlier guides published by the United States Department of Commerce. This is a de facto naming standard and guide to travellers. Some letter types correspond to several current ratings or different technical standards, so the letter does not uniquely identify a plug and socket within the type family, nor guarantee compatibility. Physical compatibility of the plug and socket does not ensure correct voltage, frequency, or current capacity. Not all plug and socket families have letters in the IEC guide, but those that have are noted in this article, as are some additional letters commonly used by retail vendors.

In Europe, CENELEC publishes a list of approved plug and socket technical standards used in the member countries.

=== Australasian AS/NZS 3112 and compatible plugs (Type I) ===
A number of countries in Oceania as well as China and Argentina use a plug that has two flat pins at an angle, forming a V-shape, as well as a flat vertical grounding pin. While the exact pin dimensions and the polarity vary between different countries, these plugs and sockets are all compatible with each other and are known as Type I.

==== Argentina IRAM 2073 and 2071 ====
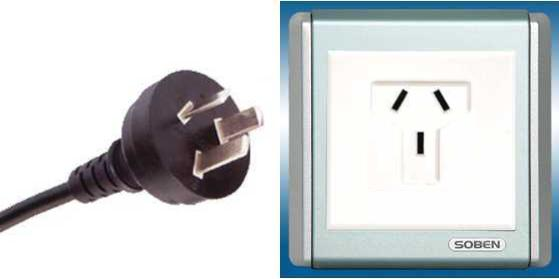
Type I grounded plug and socket, both rated for 10 A. Insulating sleeves around the power pins are optional in Argentina and in this case missing. The socket is installed with the earth receptacle down, as usual in Argentina.

The plug and socket system used in Argentina is defined by several standards of the Argentine Normalization and Certification Institute (IRAM). IRAM 2071 defines two sockets that have the same form factor, but differ in size and rating. The smaller, more common socket is rated for 10 A. The larger variant, rated for 20 A, is mostly used for higher-power appliances such as air conditioners. IRAM 2073 defines the corresponding plugs used for Class I appliances (that require earthing). The plug and socket system has an earthing pin and two flat current-carrying pins forming an inverted V-shape (120°).

The pins for the 10 A version measure 6.25 by 1.55 mm (0.246 by 0.061 in). The power pins are set at 30° to the vertical with a distance of 7.92 mm (0.312 in) from their centres to the centre of the plug; they are 18.2 mm (0.717 in) long. The earthing pin is 21.4 mm (0.843 in) long and placed below the plug centre at a distance of 10.31 mm (0.406 in). The pins of the 20 A version are larger – 8.0 by 1.9 mm (0.315 by 0.075 in) – and placed further away from the centre of the plug – 9.53 mm (0.375 in) for the power pins, 11.1 mm (0.437 in) for the earthing pin. At 21.8 mm (0.858 in), the earthing pin is a bit longer, while the power pins are a bit shorter at 17.8 mm (0.701 in).

There is also an unearthed version of the 10 A plug, defined by IRAM 2063, that lacks an earthing pin and can be used with Class II appliances. 20 A plugs, on the other hand, must always provide earthing.

Insulating sleeves around the upper parts of the power pins are allowed, but not required. When used, they significantly reduce the risk of electric shock from accidentally touching the pins of a partially inserted plug. Because the pins of the 20 A plug are placed farther apart than those of the 10 A plug, the two Argentine plug types are mutually incompatible. It is not possible to insert a 20 A plug into a 10 A socket or vice versa.

The most important difference from the Australasian and Chinese plugs is that the Argentine plug is wired with the live and neutral contacts reversed. In Argentina, when the earth contact is positioned downward, the live (line) contact is on the right side of the socket, while in Australasia and China it is on the left (assuming the same orientation).

In Brazil, Type I–style plugs and sockets are still commonly used in old installations for high-power appliances like air conditioners, dishwashers, and household ovens. These are often called "Argentine plugs" and are indeed physically identical to the IRAM plugs rated for 20 A, though they might have been developed independently on the basis of the American NEMA 10-20 standard (which uses the same form factor). While these plugs are sometimes used for normal single-phase power and wired in the same way as in Argentina, some are wired for split-phase power with two "hot" (or phase) wires and a neutral wire, but no earth connection. Care must therefore be taken that the same wiring scheme is used in the socket and in the plug, since otherwise the equipment would surely be damaged. In newer installations, the 20 A version of the Type N plug, adopted by Brazil as national standard NBR 14136, is generally preferred.

==== Australian/New Zealand standard AS/NZS 3112 ====
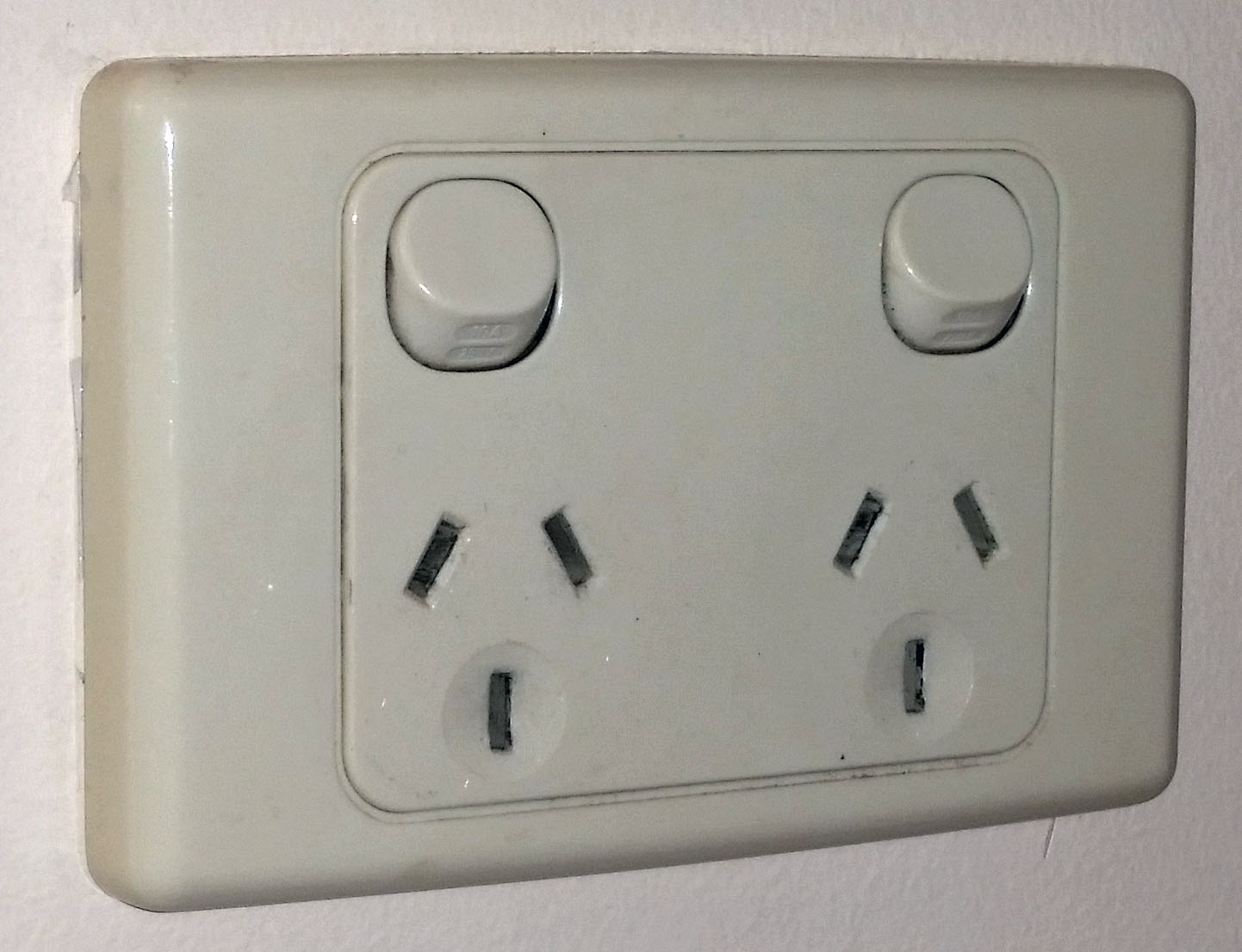
Australasian switched three-pin (10 A) dual socket outlet, the most commonly found variant

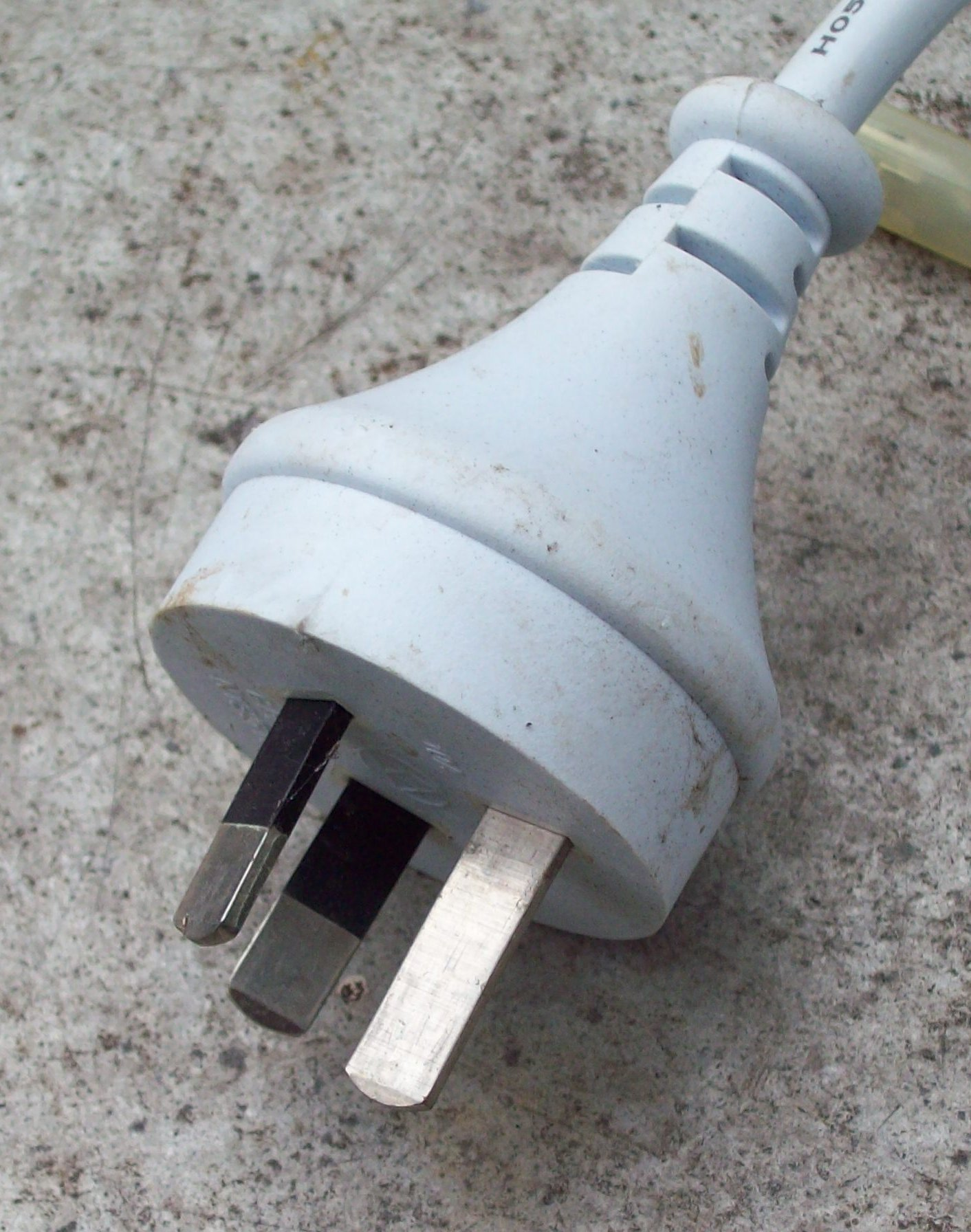
Australian 10 A power plug with insulated pins

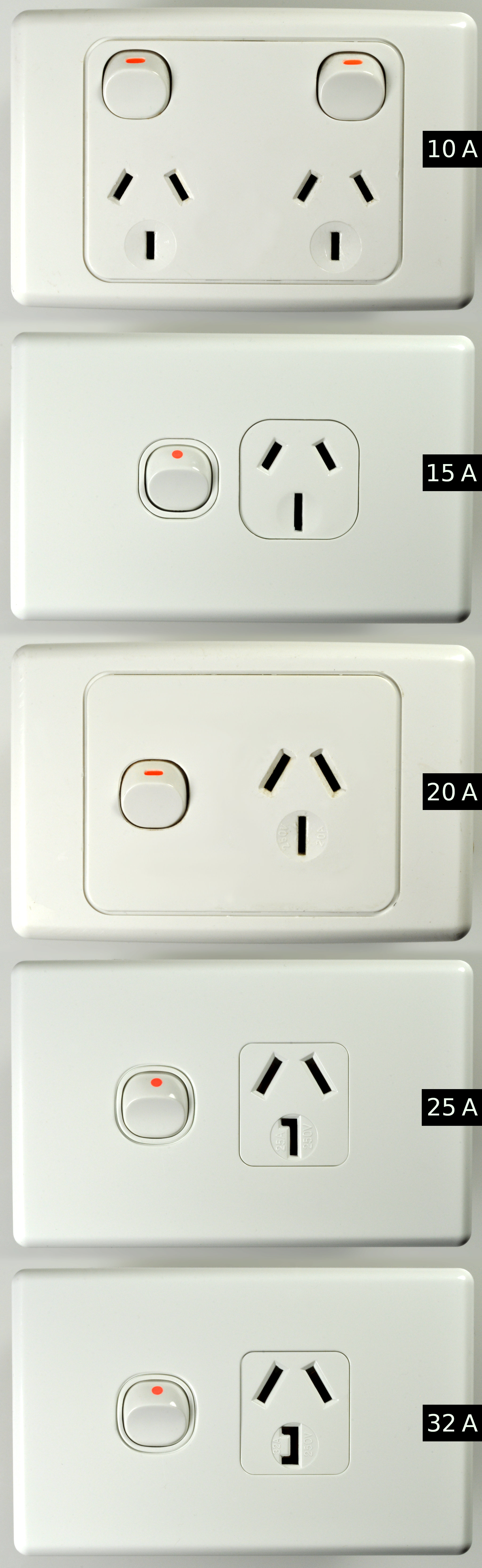
10 A, 15 A, 20 A, 25 A, and 32 A single-phase sockets. Each socket accepts plugs of equal or lesser current rating.

This Australian/New Zealand standard is used in Australia, New Zealand, Fiji, Tonga, Solomon Islands, and Papua New Guinea. The plug shape and basic dimensions are identical to the 10 A plug used in Argentina. The Australasian standard defines a series of plugs and sockets for devices drawing up to 10, 15, 20, 25 and 32 A that are one-way compatible. All sockets accept plugs of equal or lower current ratings, but not higher. For example, a 10 A plug will fit all sockets but a 20 A plug will fit only 20, 25 and 32 A sockets.

In all plugs, the power pins are set at 30° to the vertical with a distance of 7.92 mm (0.312 in) from their centres to the centre of the plug, while the earthing pin is placed below the plug centre at a distance of 10.31 mm (0.406 in) – exactly the same dimensions as used by the Argentine 10 A plug. The three flat pins all measure 6.35 by 1.63 mm (0.250 by 0.064 in) – very slightly larger than in Argentina. The length of the power pins is 17.06 mm (0.672 in), while the earthing pin has a length of 19.94 mm (0.785 in) – somewhat shorter than in Argentina.

In the 15 A plug, the height of the earth pin is increased from 6.35 to 9.08 mm (0.357 in), while the dimensions of the power pins remain the same. In the 20 A plug, however, their height is increased in the same way, so that the surface dimensions of the three pins are again identical. In the 25 A version, the earthing pin takes the shape of an inverted L (an extra bar is added at the top end), and in the 32 A version it takes the shape of a sideways U (extra bars are added at both ends).

In general, only 10 A and 15 A socket outlets are likely to be encountered in domestic or commercial installations. 20 A sockets are rare and higher rated ones are very rare. An unearthed version of the 10 A plug with two angled power pins but no earthing pin is used with double-insulated appliances, but sockets and higher-rated plugs always include an earth contact. In New Zealand, PDL 940 "tap-on" or "piggy-back" plugs are available which allow a second 10 A plug to be fitted to the rear of the plug. In Australia these piggy-back plugs are now available only on pre-made extension leads.

A novel feature of modern Australian socket outlets is a snap-fitting surround for the socket, covering the screws that affix the socket to the wall, and extending all the way around the socket periphery. Australia is unique in having electrical rules that stipulate that only licensed electricians may remove the socket from the wall, so the easily removed outer cover facilitates repainting the wall without exposing power and incurring the expense of engaging an electrician to remove and replace the sockets.

Australia's standard plug/socket system was originally codified as standard C112 (floated provisionally in 1937, and adopted as a formal standard in 1938), which was based on a design patented by Harvey Hubbell and was superseded by AS 3112 in 1990.

The requirement for insulated pins was introduced in the 2000 revision, and became effective 5 years after its publication. The current version is AS/NZS 3112:2025.

==== China GB 2099.1 and GB 1002 (Type A & I) ====
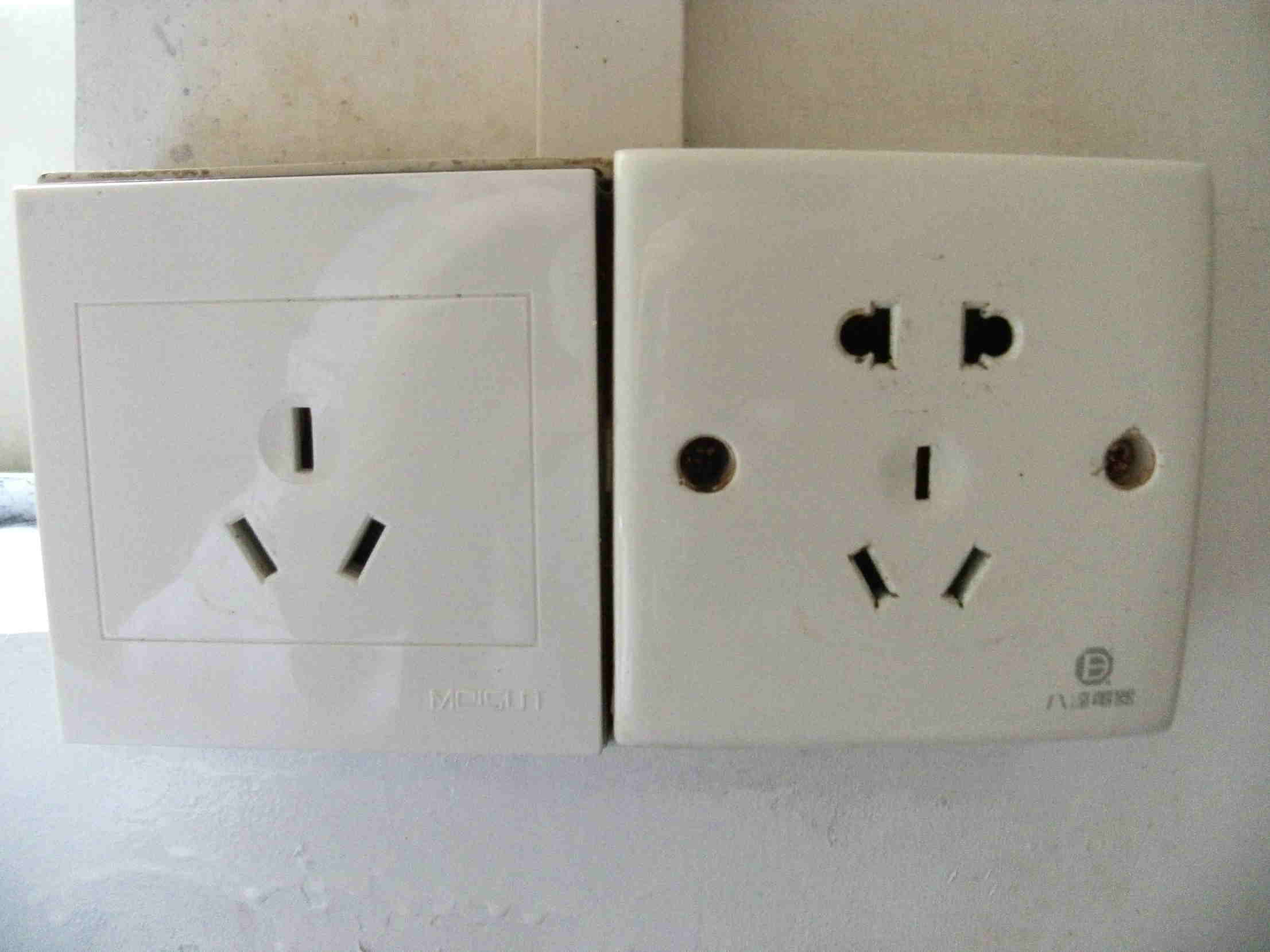
Chinese three-pin socket and compound socket which also accepts NEMA and Europlug (right), and a less common, larger 16 A version (left)

The standard for Mainland Chinese plugs and sockets (excluding Hong Kong and Macau) is set out in GB 2099.1 and GB 1002. As part of China's commitment for entry into the WTO, the new CPCS (Compulsory Product Certification System) has been introduced, and compliant Chinese plugs have been awarded the CCC Mark by this system. The plugs are three-wire, earthed, rated for 10 or 16 A, 250 V, and are chiefly used for Class I applications. The pins of the 10 A version are 1.55 mm (0.061 in) thick by 6.4 mm (0.252 in) wide; the centres of the power pins are placed 7.9 mm (0.311 in) from the plug centre, while the centre of the earth pin is 10.3 mm (0.406 in) away. In both plug types, the live and neutral pins are 18 mm (0.709 in) long, while the earth pin is 21 mm (0.827 in) long. This makes the 10 A version compatible with Argentine and Australasian 10 A sockets, as their dimensions are nearly identical.

Except for the pin length, all dimensions of the 16 A version are slightly larger. Its pins are 1.8 by 8.1 mm (0.071 by 0.319 in); the centres of the power pins are placed 9.5 mm (0.374 in) from the plug centre, while the centre of the earth pin is 11.1 mm (0.437 in) away. This makes this plug compatible with the 20 A sockets used in Argentina. It is, however, incompatible with Chinese 10 A sockets as well as all Australasian sockets because of the different pin spacing.

Some sockets in China include a physical lockout preventing access to the active and neutral terminals unless an earth pin (which is slightly longer than the other two pins) is entered first; others require pins to be inserted into both live terminals to open the shutter. Since its 2024 revision, GB 1002 also defines unearthed two-pin Class II plugs, though such plugs cannot be inserted into sockets that require an earth pin to open the shutters. Already since 2008 for 16 A, and since 2021 also for 10 A, there is an unearthed Class II plug variant that uses an unwired dummy earth pin to open the shutters; unearthed plugs of this kind fit into all Chinese sockets of the same rating.

China also uses American/Japanese NEMA 1-15 sockets and plugs for Class II appliances (however, polarized plugs with one prong wider than the other are not accepted). Older versions of GB 1002 also defined a socket type that accepts Europlugs (Type C), but this hybrid socket was removed from the 2021 revision of the standard. The voltage at a Chinese socket of any type is 220 V.

In China, sockets typically have the earth contact above the power pins, while in Argentina and Australasia it is usually positioned below them. While Australasian plugs have insulating sleeves around the upper part of their power pins, that is not the case for most existing Chinese plugs, hence their pins may become live while there is still a large enough gap between the faces of the plug and socket to allow a finger to touch the pin. Since 2022, insulating sleeves are also allowed on plugs sold in China; they will be mandatory from 2027.

=== British and compatible standards ===
United Kingdom has three socket-outlet systems as stated in BS 7671: BS 1363, BS 546 and BS 4573 (British shaver). The polarity of all grounded British sockets is standardized: the CPC (circuit protective conductor – earth) is at the top and live is at the right of the socket when viewed from the back. This convention is followed in other countries using British plug types and sockets. The BS 4573 (British shaver) plug is two pin and unpolarised.

==== BS 546 and related types (Type D and M) ====
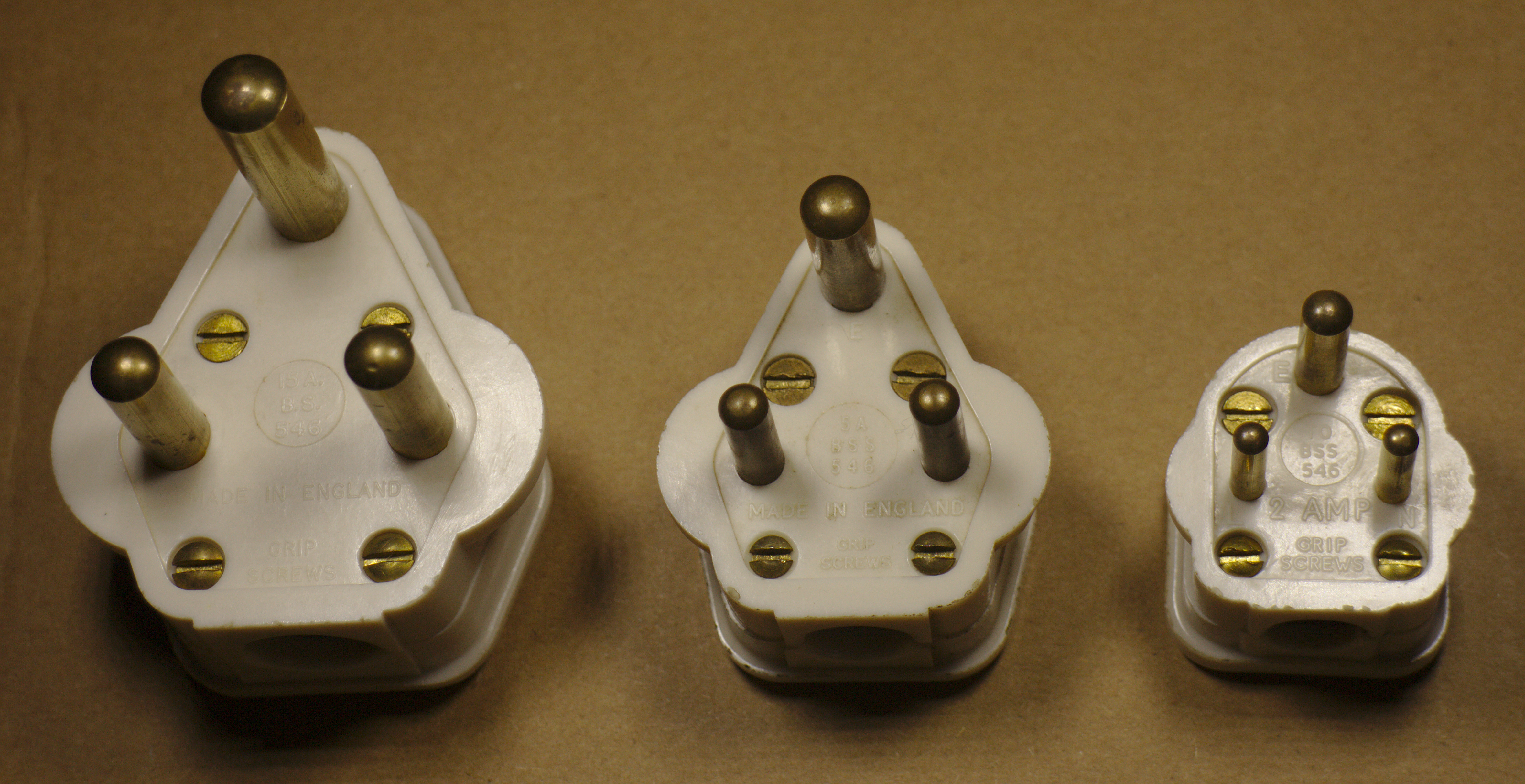
BS 546 plugs. Left to right: 15 A, 5 A and 2 A.

BS 546, "Two-pole and earthing-pin plugs, socket-outlets and adaptors", describes four sizes of plug rated at 2 A, 5 A (Type D), 15 A (Type M) and 30 A. The plugs have three round pins arranged in a triangle, with the larger top pin being the CPC pin. The plugs are polarized and unfused. Plugs are non-interchangeable between current ratings. Introduced in 1934, the BS 546 standard is in BS 7671 and current for general use, however has mostly been displaced in the UK by the BS 1363 standard for power circuit use. According to the IEC, some 40 countries use Type D (among them India) and about 15 countries use Type M.

==== BS 1363 (Type G) ====
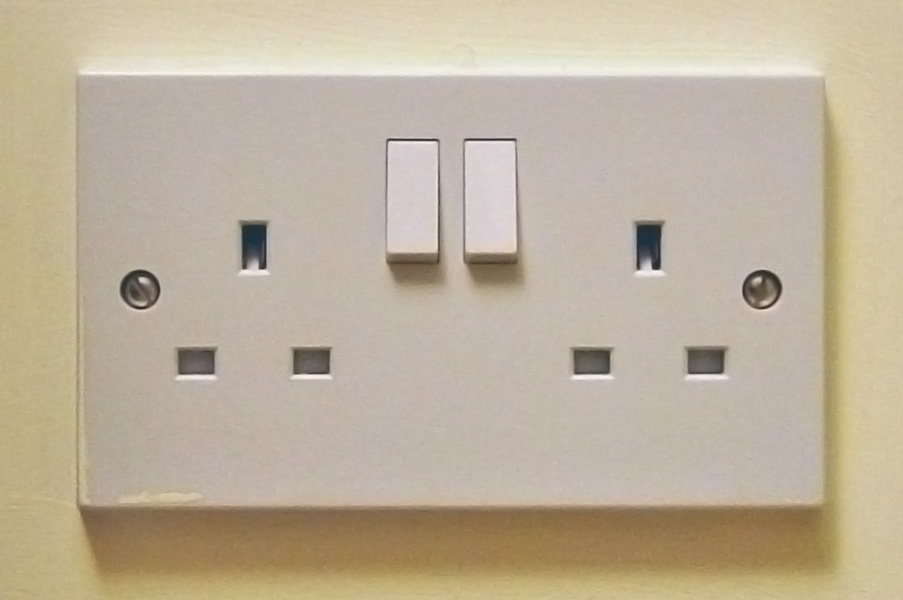
BS 1363 sockets

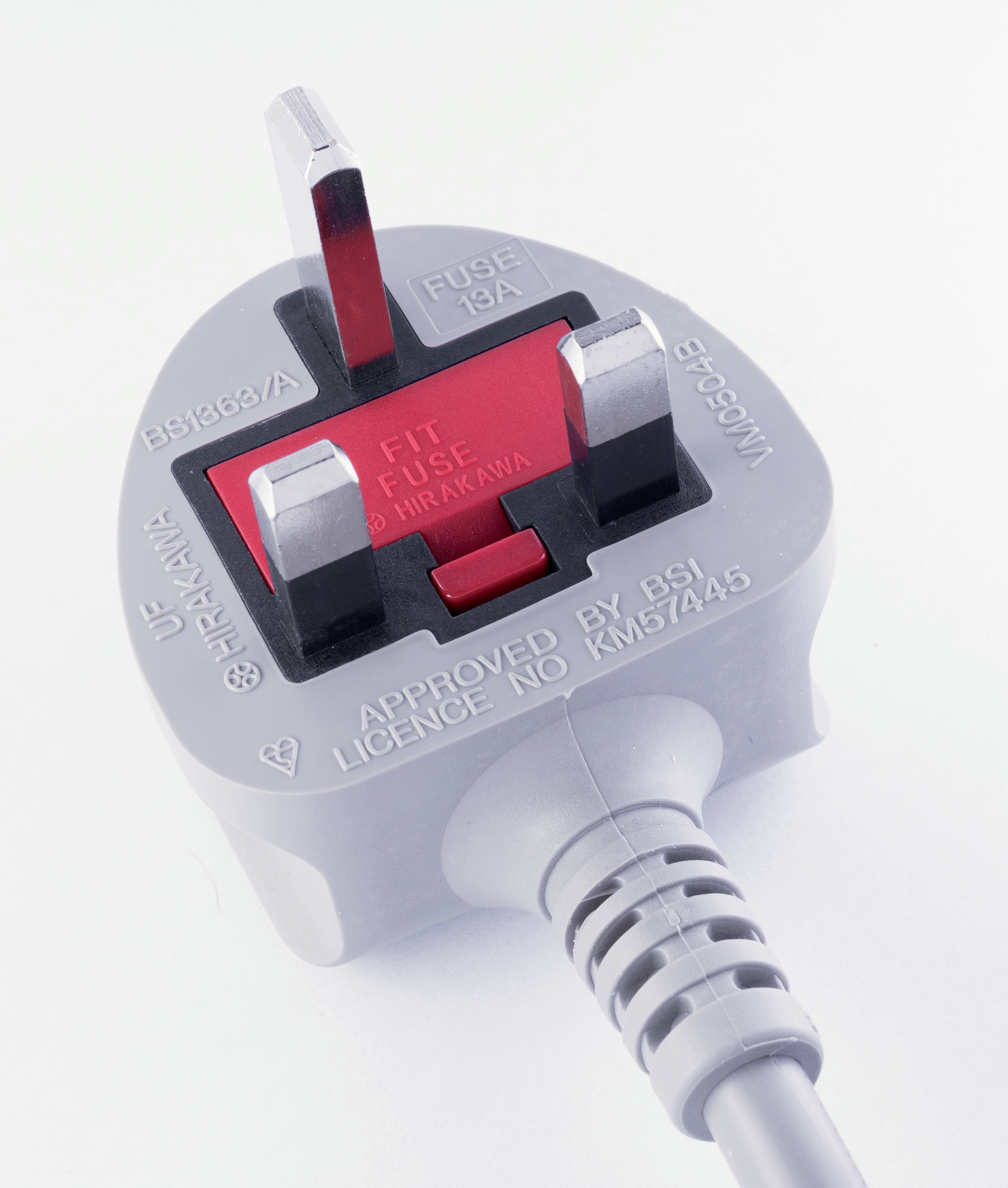
BS 1363 plug with fuse compartment visible

The BS 1363 plug-and-socket system is the most widely used in the United Kingdom. According to the IEC the BS 1363 socket-outlet system is used in more than 50 countries worldwide. Some of these countries have national standards based on BS 7671, including: Bahrain, Hong Kong, Ireland, Cyprus, Macau, Malaysia, Malta, Saudi Arabia, Singapore, Brunei, Sri Lanka, and the UAE, amongst others.

The BS 1363 plug has three rectangular pins forming an isosceles triangle, with the top pin being the CPC (circuit protective conductor – earth). An integrated fuse is incoporated that has to be rated to protect its flexible cord from current overload and potential fire risk. Most modern appliances are sold with a fuse of the appropriate size pre-installed.

==== BS 4573 (British shaver) ====
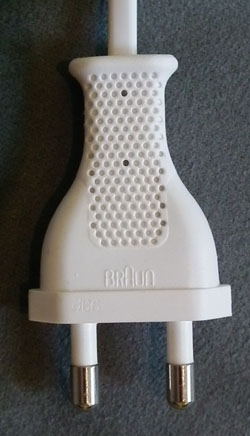
BS 4573 plug

The United Kingdom, Ireland, and Malta use the BS 4573 two-pin plug and socket for electric shavers and toothbrushes. The plug has insulating sleeves on the pins. Although similar to the Europlug Type C, the diameter and spacing of the pins are slightly different and hence it will not fit into a Schuko socket. There are, however, two-pin sockets and adaptors which will accept both BS 4573 and Europlugs.

=== CEE 7 standard ===
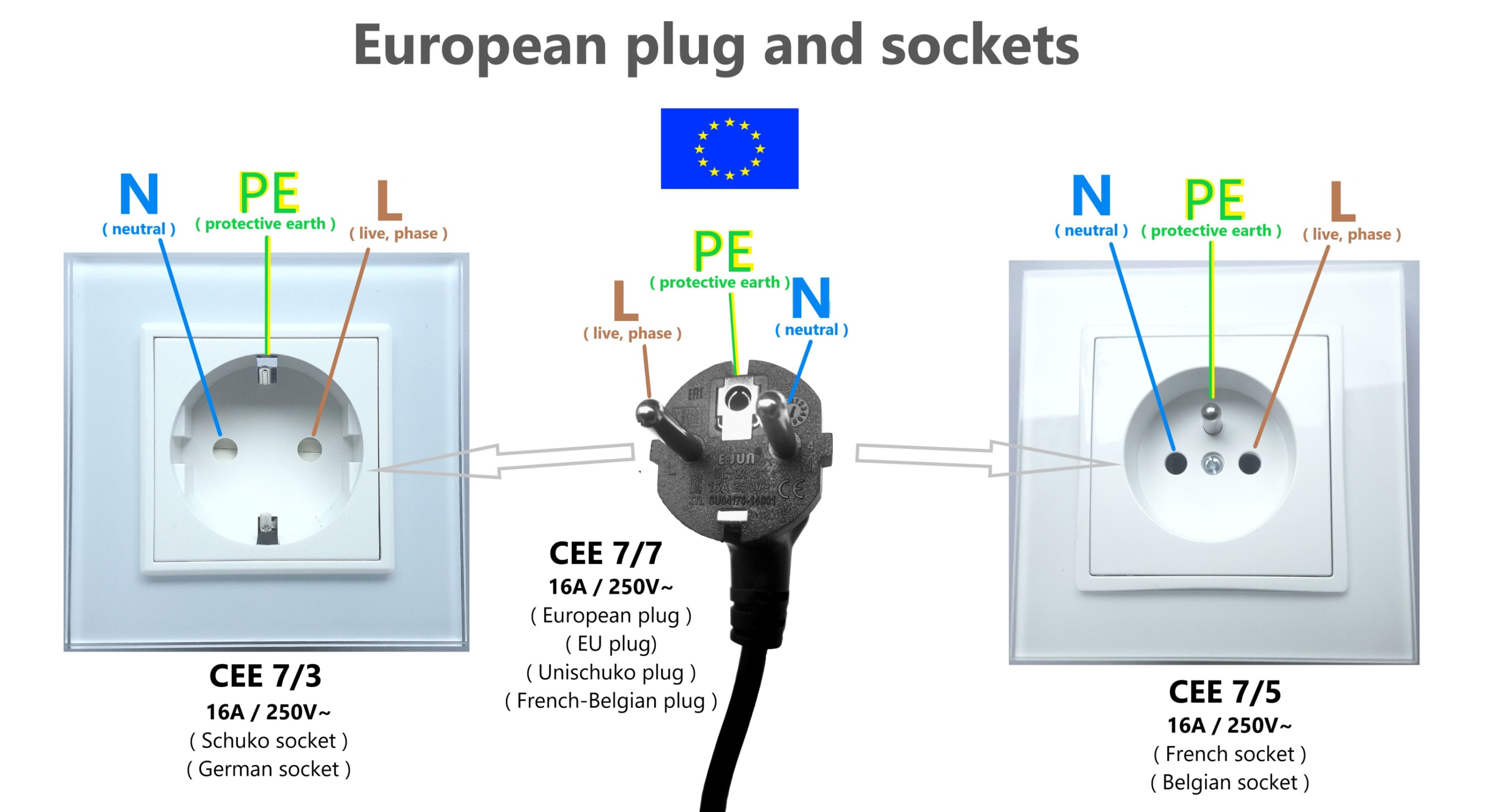
The CEE 7/7 plug is the shape-based intersection of two previously incompatible connectors. It made it possible to largely unify the European market without replacing a single socket, because it no longer matters whether the sockets provide grounding clips (CEE 7/3) or a grounding pin (CEE 7/5).

The CEE 7 standard is a set of general specifications and standard sheets for AC plugs and sockets, first created by the IECEE standards body in 1951. They are now the main system in use in most of Europe. CEE 7 incorporates the two round pinned (with centres spaced at 19 mm) Schuko or Type F plug that was patented by Siemens-Schuckertwerke in 1929, and also the Type E plug, likely developed in Belgium around 1930 but never patented, therefore adopted by Czechoslovakia, Poland and France. CEE 7 have also developed and incorporated "universal" plugs that will work on both Type E and Type F sockets such as the Europlug.

European countries (whether EU or non-EU) each have their own regulations and national standards; for example, some require child-resistant shutters, while others do not. CE marking is neither applicable nor permitted on plugs and sockets. The CEE 7 system has been adapted in many countries outside of Europe as well.

==== CEE 7/1 unearthed socket and CEE 7/2 unearthed plug ====
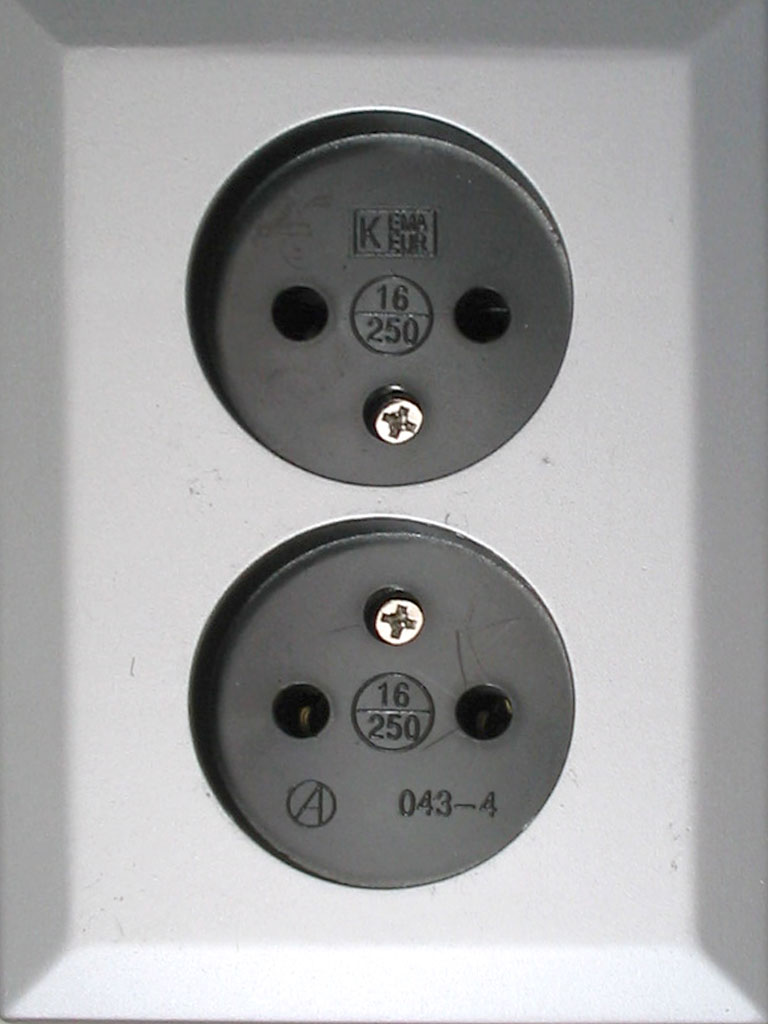
CEE 7/1 wall socket, accepts CEE 7/2 (unearthed) plugs and (unsafely) also CEE 7/4, CEE 7/6 and CEE 7/7 (earthed) plugs.

CEE 7/1 sockets and CEE 7/2 plugs are 2-pole connectors rated 10/16 A up to 250 V, with 4.8 by 19 mm (0.189 by 0.748 in) pins. It has no protective earth and therefore poses a risk of electric shock due to missing circular recess. Their sale or use has been banned in a number of countries.

==== CEE 7/3 socket and CEE 7/4 plug (German "Schuko"; Type F) ====
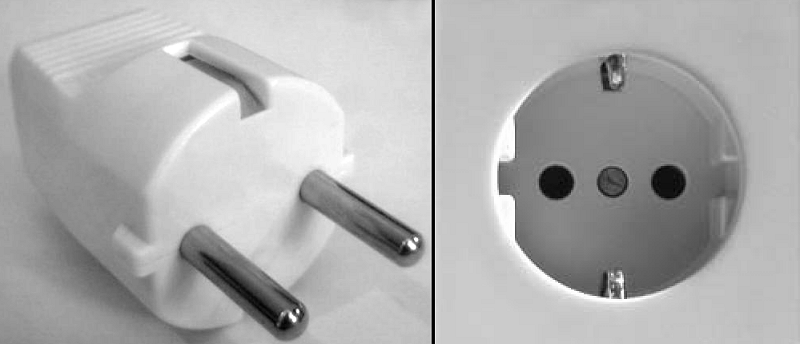
Schuko plug (CEE 7/4) and socket (CEE 7/3)

The CEE 7/3 socket and CEE 7/4 plug are commonly called Schuko, an abbreviation for Schutzkontakt, Protective contact to earth ("Schuko" itself is a registered trademark of a German association established to own the term). It is rated at 16 A. The socket has a circular recess with two round holes and two earthing clips that engage before live pin contact is made. The pins are 4.8 by 19 mm (0.189 by 0.748 in). The Schuko system is unpolarized, allowing live and neutral to be reversed.

The plug is used in most European countries and on other continents, including in South Korea and Uruguay. The European countries not using it at all are Belgium, Czech Republic, Cyprus, Ireland, Liechtenstein, Malta, Switzerland, and the United Kingdom; those not using it predominantly are Denmark, Faroe Islands, France, Italy, Monaco, San Marino, and Slovakia.

==== CEE 7/5 socket and CEE 7/6 plug (Belgian or French; Type E) ====
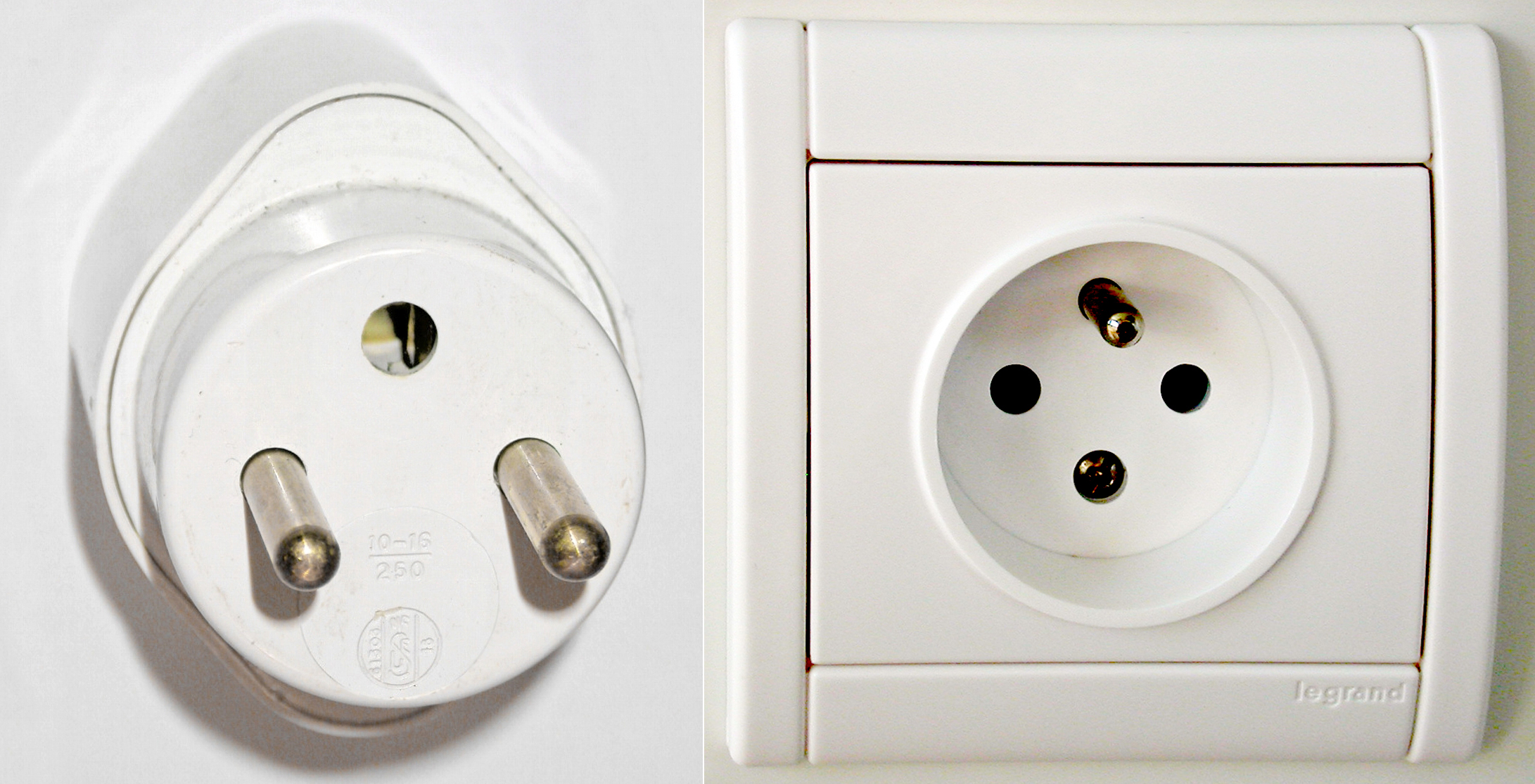
CEE 7/6 plug and CEE 7/5 socket

This electrical connector most likely originated in Belgium, where it was introduced in the 1930s by Vynckier Frères as well as Niko. The CEE 7/5 socket and CEE 7/6 plug are defined in several national standards, among them the Belgian NBN C 61‑112, the French NF C 61-314, and the Czech ČSN 35 4516. The CEE 7/5 socket is in Europe the primary standard of Belgium, Czechia, France, Poland, and Slovakia. In Denmark including the Faroe Islands and Greenland, both CEE 7/3 and CEE 7/5 are nowadays explicitly allowed alongside Type K.

The socket has a circular recess with two round holes. The round earth pin projecting from the socket connects before the energized contacts touch. The earth pin is centred between the apertures, offset by 10 mm (0.394 in). The plug has two round pins measuring 4.8 by 19 mm (0.189 by 0.748 in), spaced 19 mm (0.748 in) apart and with an aperture for the socket's projecting earth pin.

==== Hybrid connectors ====
===== CEE 7/7 plug (compatible with E and F) =====
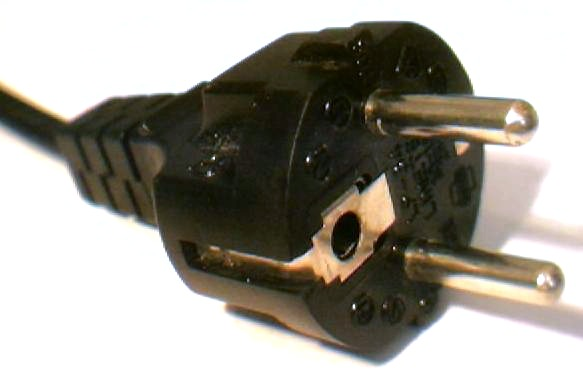
Hybrid CEE 7/7 plug

CEE 7/4 (Schuko) plugs are not compatible with the CEE 7/5 (Belgian/French) socket because of the round earthing pin permanently mounted in the socket; CEE 7/6 (Belgian/French) plugs are not compatible with Schuko sockets due to the presence of indentations on the side of the recess, as well as the earth clips. CEE 7/7 plugs have been designed to solve this incompatibility by being able to fit in either type of socket.

The plug is rated at 16 A and looks similar to CEE 7/4 plugs, but with earth contacts to fit both CEE 7/5 and CEE 7/3 sockets. Due to its compatibility with the inherently unpolarized Schuko (CEE 7/4) plugs, appliances using it cannot expect the current to flow in any particular direction.

===== CEE 7/16 Alternative I =====
The CEE 7/16 Alternative I unearthed plug is used for unearthed appliances. It has two round 4 by 19 mm (0.157 by 0.748 in) pins, rated at 2.5 A. Alternative I is a round plug with cutouts to make it compatible with CEE 7/3 and CEE 7/5 sockets. (The similar-appearing CEE 7/17 has larger pins and a higher current rating.) This alternative is seldom used.

===== CEE 7/16 Alternative II "Europlug" (Type C) =====
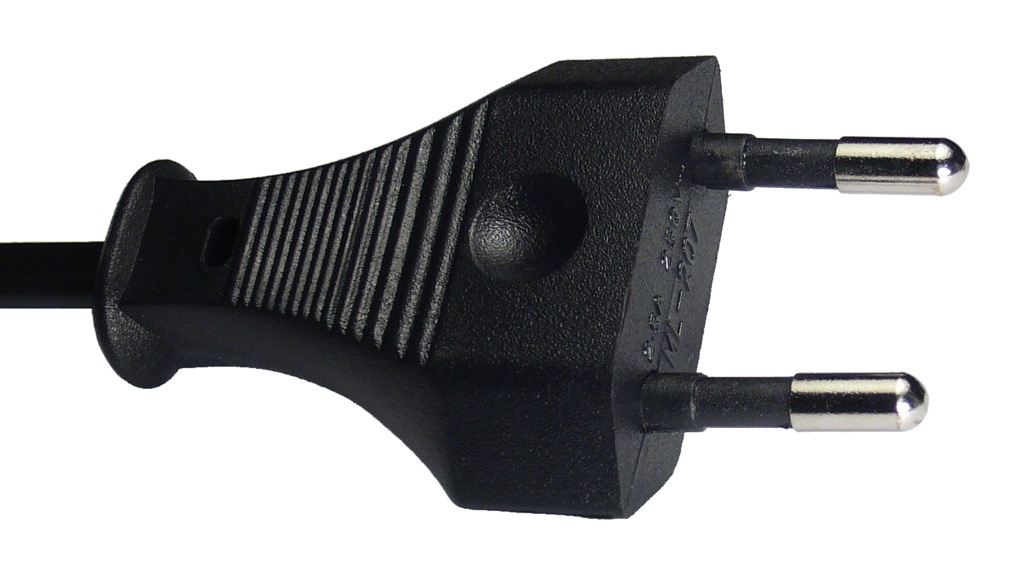
Europlug

Alternative II, popularly known as the Europlug, is a flat 2.5 A-rated plug with two round 4 by 19 mm (0.157 by 0.748 in) pins, defined by Cenelec standard EN 50075 and national equivalents. The Europlug is not rewirable and must be supplied with a flexible cord. It can be inserted in either direction, so live and neutral are connected arbitrarily. To improve contact with socket parts the Europlug has slightly flexible pins which converge toward their free ends.

The Europlug is widely used in most of Europe and parts of the Middle East, Africa, South America, and Asia. There is no socket defined to accept only the Europlug. Instead, it fits a range of sockets including all three CEE 7 sockets (unearthed, German/"Schuko", and Belgian/French) and also many non-CEE 7 standard sockets such as Swiss, Danish and Italian (10 A) ones as well as Israeli sockets. British shaver sockets also accept Europlugs, although in this configuration the connection supply is only rated at 200 mA.

==== CEE 7/17 unearthed "contour" plug ====
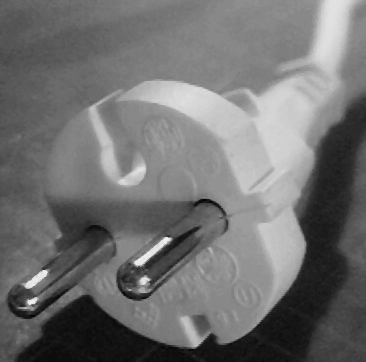
Hybrid unearthed CEE 7/17 plug

This is a round plug compatible with all three types of CEE 7 sockets. Also called the "contour plug", it has two round pins measuring 4.8 by 19 mm (0.189 by 0.748 in). The pins are not sheathed, in contrast to e.g. CEE 7/16 Europlugs. It may be rated at either 10 A or 16 A.

=== Danish plug (Type K) ===
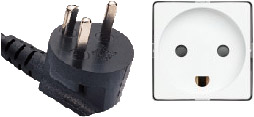
Standard Danish plug and socket

This Danish standard plug is described in the Danish Plug Equipment Section 107-2-D1 Standard sheet (SRAF1962/DB 16/87 DN10A-R). Like in most European plugs, the power pins of Danish plugs are 19 mm (0.75 in) long and spaced 19 mm (0.75 in) apart, with a diameter of 4.8 mm (0.19 in). The earthing pin is part of the plug (in contrast to French and Schuko plugs); it is D-shaped, 14 mm (0.55 in) long, and offset from the power pins by 13 mm (0.51 in). It is 4 mm (0.16 in) thick with a diameter of 6.5 mm (0.26 in). Sockets and plugs are rated for 16 A. The Danish standard provides for sockets to have child-resistant shutters. Sockets are polarized in the same way as British ones: if earth is at the bottom, live is at the left of the socket.

Europlugs (CEE 7/16) and contour plugs (CEE 7/17) can safely be used with Danish sockets. Physically the sockets also accept earthed CEE 7/4 (Schuko), CEE 7/6 (French), and CEE 7/7 (Schuko-French hybrid) plugs, but no earth connection will be established. Therefore news sites and industry magazines warn that plugging these directly into a Type K socket can give noticeable electric shocks, be dangerous and even be life-threatening.

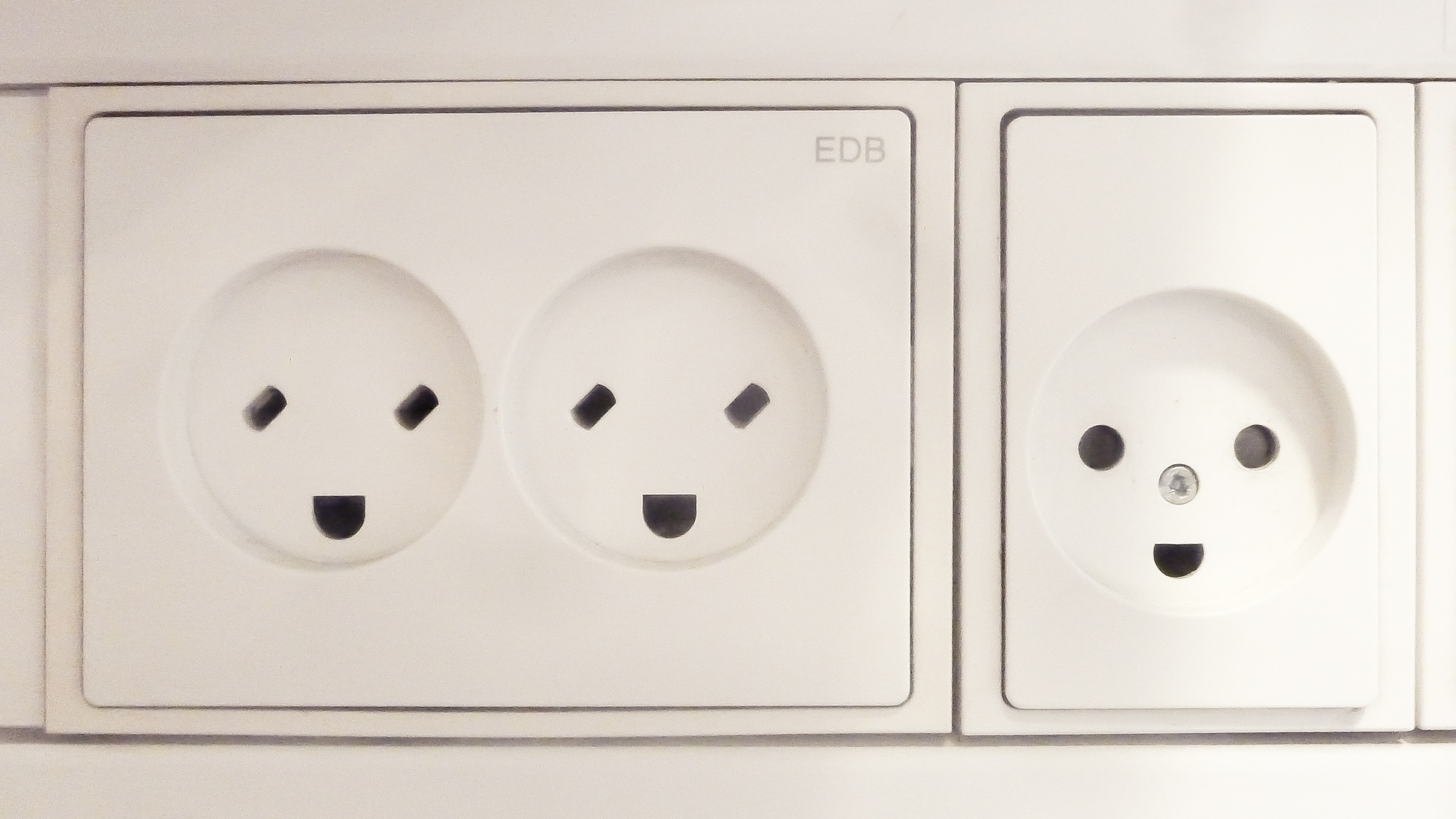
Two sockets for the tilted flattened pins and half-round earth pin of a Danish computer plug. On the right is a normal socket (which can also accept computer plugs).

Traditionally all Danish sockets were equipped with a switch to prevent touching live pins when connecting/disconnecting the plug. Today, sockets without switch are allowed, but they must be recessed to prevent touching the live pins. Since the early 1990s earthed sockets have been required in all new electric installations in Denmark. Older sockets need not be earthed, but all sockets, including old installations, must be protected by earth-fault interrupters by 1 July 2008.

A variation (standard DK 2-5a) of the Danish plug is for use only on surge protected computer sockets. It fits into the corresponding computer socket and the normal socket, but normal plugs deliberately do not fit into the special computer socket. The plug is often used in companies, but rarely in private homes. There is another variation for hospital equipment with a rectangular left pin, which is used for life support equipment.

=== IEC 60906-1 (Type N) ===
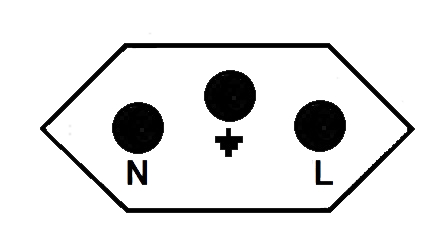
IEC 60906-1 (Type N) socket

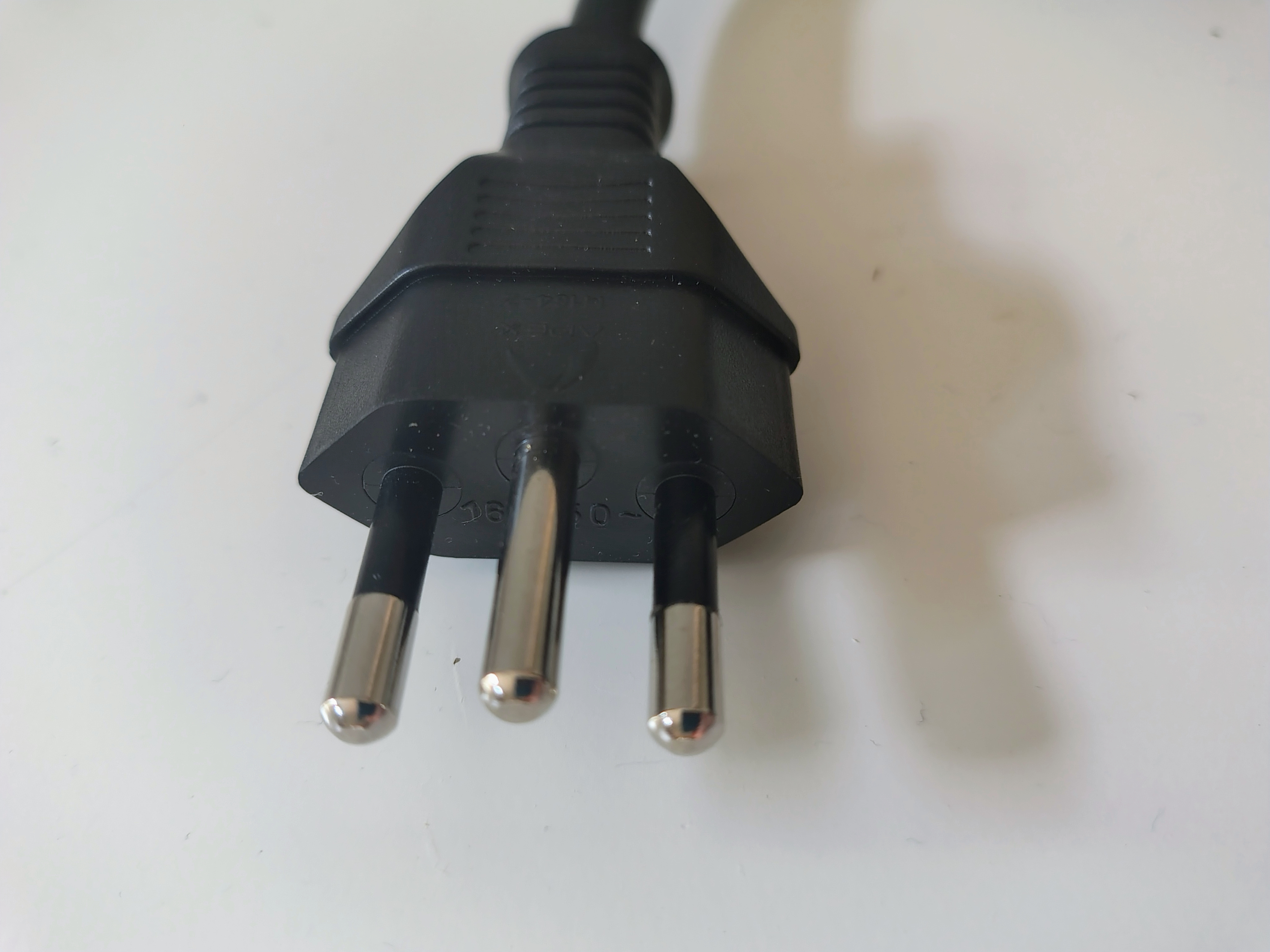
Three-pin 16 A plug conforming to South African Standard SANS 164-2

In 1986, the International Electrotechnical Commission published IEC 60906-1, a specification for a plug and socket that look similar, but are not identical, to the Swiss plug and socket. This standard was intended to one day become common for all of Europe and other regions with 230 V mains, but the effort to adopt it as a European Union standard was put on hold in the mid-1990s.

The plug and socket are rated 16 A 250 V AC and are intended for use only on systems having nominal voltages between 200 V and 250 V AC. The plug pins are 4.5 mm in diameter, live and neutral are on centres 19 mm apart. The earth pin is offset by 3.0 mm. The live pin is on the right when looking at a socket with the earth pin offset up. Shutters over the live and neutral pins are mandatory.

The first country to have officially adopted the standard is South Africa (as SANS 164-2). Paraguay has also adopted it as national standard (PNA-IEC 60906-1), but so far its application is voluntary, and as of March 2025, there is no indication that sockets of this type are commonly installed in the country.

Brazil developed a plug resembling IEC 60906-1 as the national standard under specification NBR 14136. The NBR 14136 standard has two versions, neither of which has pin dimensions or ratings complying with IEC 60906-1. Use at 127 V is permitted by NBR 14136, which is against the intention of IEC 60906-1.

==== South African standard SANS 164-2 ====
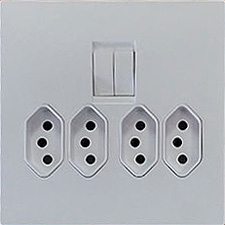
South African SANS 164-2, quadruple socket

South Africa adopted IEC 60906-1 as its national standard, SANS 164-2, in 1992. The standard specifies both a 2-pin unearthed and 3-pin earthed plug system, equivalent to IEC Type N. SANS 164-2 was designated the "preferred standard" in 2013, and South Africa is in the process of transitioning to it as the dominant system, expected to be completed by 2025 to 2035.

The SANS 164-2 system is compatible with the SANS 164-5 Europlug, commonly used in the country. This transition aims to improve electrical safety and standardization, aligning South Africa with international plug and socket systems.

==== Brazilian standard NBR 14136 ====
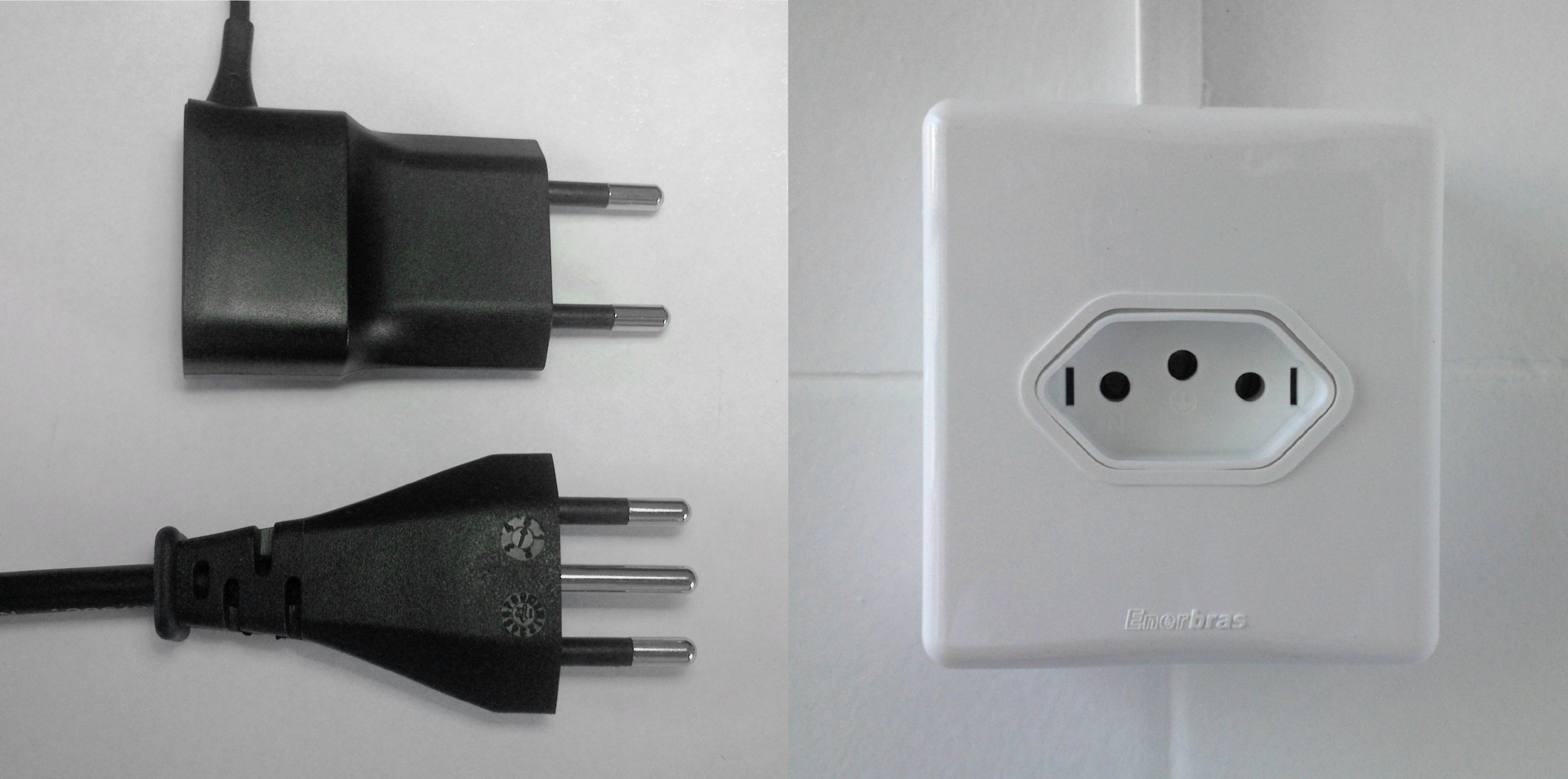
Two-pin charger, three-pin 10 A plug and 10 A socket-outlet conforming to Brazilian Standard NBR 14136

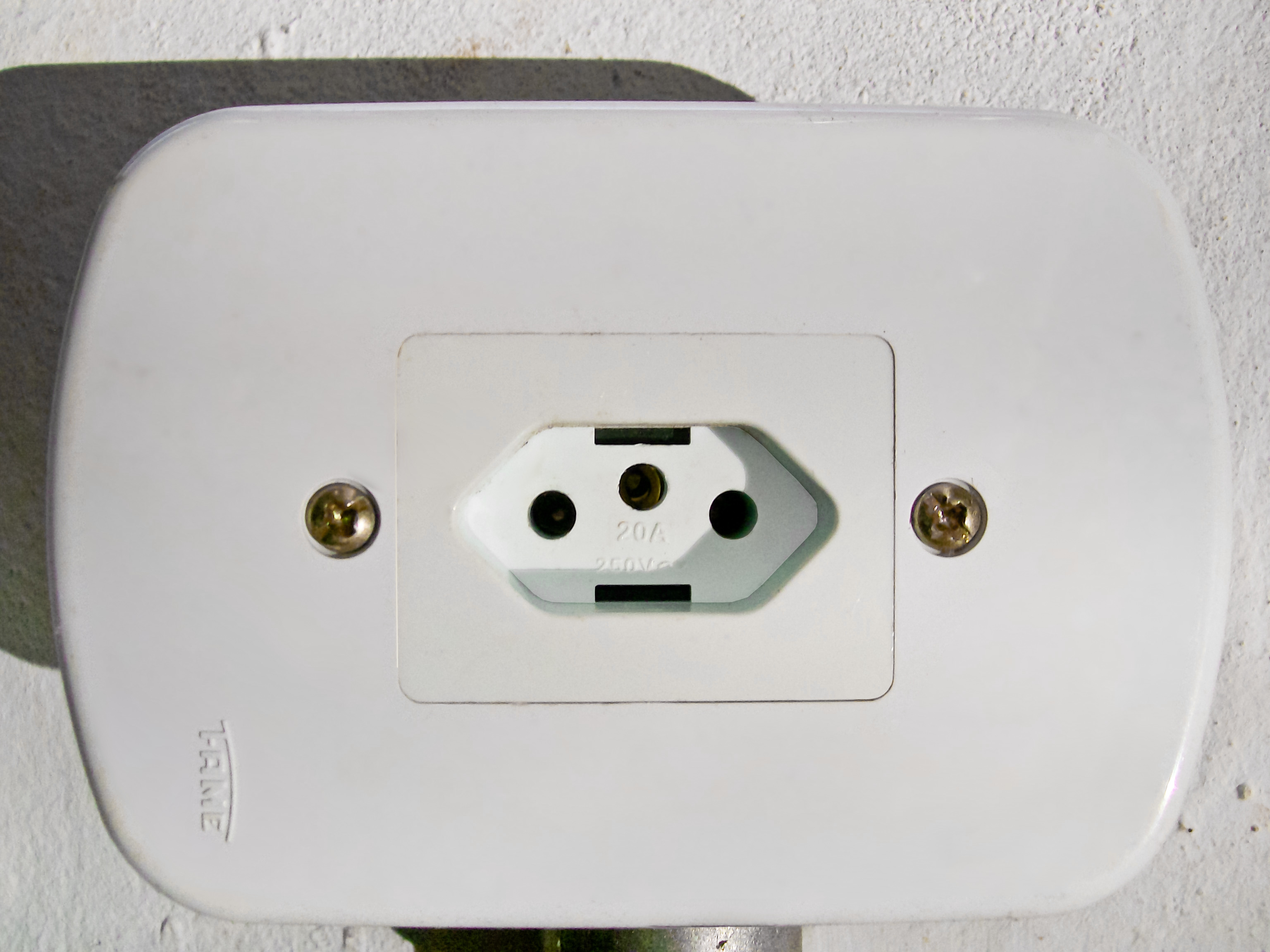
Brazilian 20 A socket

Brazil, which had been using mostly Europlugs as well as NEMA 1-15 and NEMA 5-15 plugs, adopted a (non-compliant) variant of IEC 60906-1 as the national standard in 1998 under specification NBR 14136 (revised in 2002). These are used for both 220-volt and 127-volt regions of the country, despite the IEC 60906-2 recommendation that NEMA 5-15 be used for 120 V connections. There are two types of sockets and plugs in NBR 14136: one for 10 A, with a 4.0 mm pin diameter, and another for 20 A, with a 4.8 mm pin diameter. This differs from IEC 60906-1 which specifies a pin diameter of 4.5 mm and a rating of 16 A. NBR 14136 does not require shutters on the apertures, a further aspect of non-compliance with IEC 60906-1. NBR 14136 was not enforced in that country until 2007, when its adoption was made optional for manufacturers. It became compulsory on 1 January 2010.

Few private houses in Brazil have an earthed supply, so even if a three-pin socket is present it is not safe to assume that all three terminals are actually connected. Most large domestic appliances were sold with the option to fit a flying earth tail to be locally earthed, but many consumers were unsure how to use this and so did not connect it. The new standard has an earth pin, which in theory eliminates the need for the flying earth tail.

Due to their smaller pin diameter, Brazilian plugs rated for 10 A also fit into Brazilian sockets rated for 20 A and South African sockets rated for 16 A. 20 A plugs do not fit into 10 A sockets, which is as intended. However, if the Brazilian and South African variants are mixed, due to receptacle tolerances it might be possible to insert a 16 A plug into a 10 A socket or a 20 A plug into a 16 A socket, which could overload the socket.

=== Israel SI32 (Type H) ===
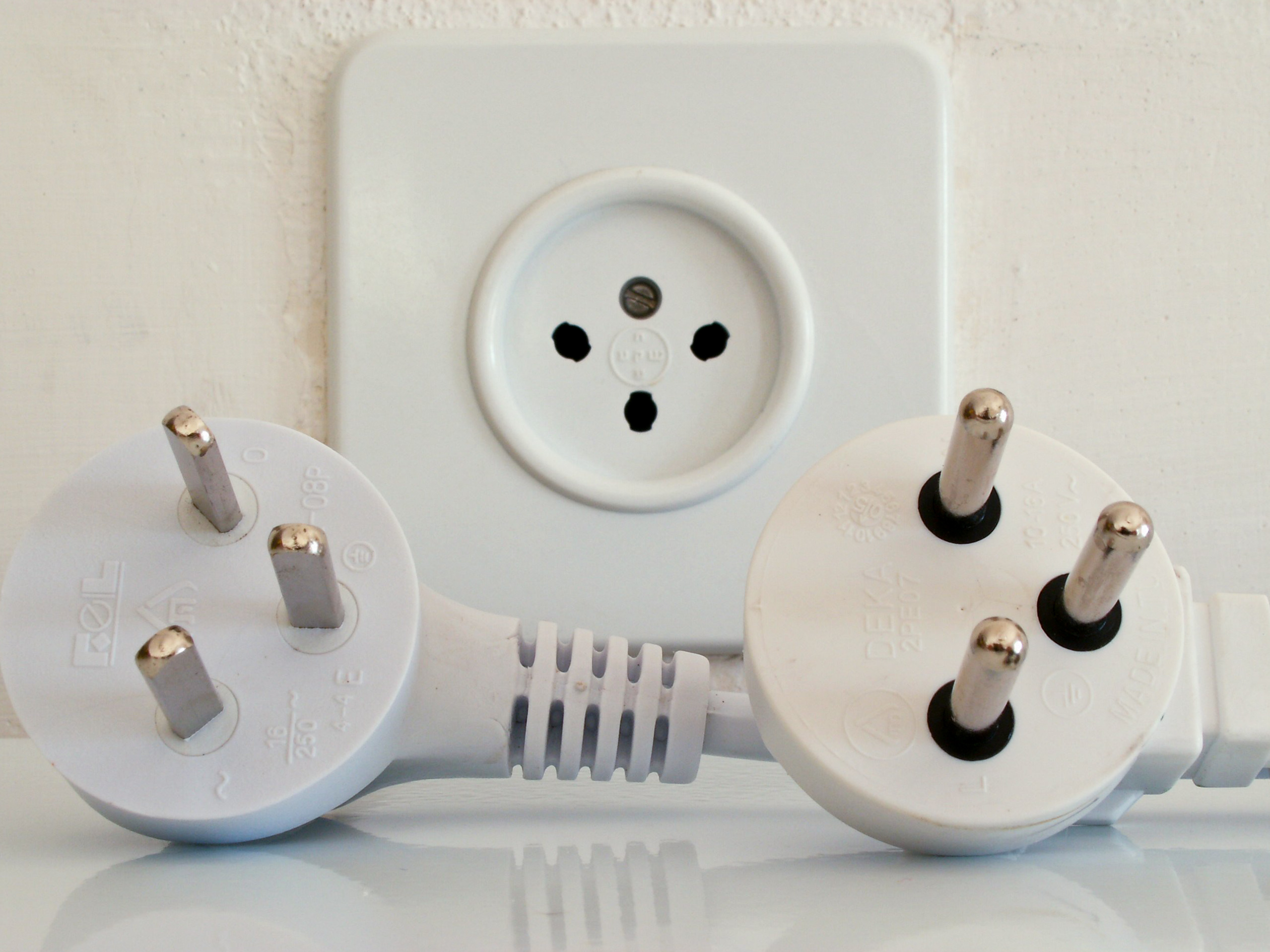
Two Israeli plugs and one socket. The left plug is the old standard; the one on the right is the 1989 revision.

The plug defined in SI 32 (IS16A-R) is used only in Israel, the Gaza Strip and the West Bank. There are two versions: an older one with flat pins, and a newer one with round pins.

The pre-1989 system has three flat pins in a Y-shape, with live and neutral 19 mm (0.75 in) apart. The plug is rated at 16 A. In 1989 the standard was revised, with three round 4.5 mm (0.177 in) pins in the same locations designed to allow the socket to accept both older and newer Israeli plugs, and also non-grounded Europlugs (often used in Israel for equipment which does not need to be grounded and does not use more current than the Europlug is rated for). Pre-1989 sockets which accept only old-style plugs have become very rare in Israel.

Sockets have a defined polarity; looking at the front, neutral is to the left, ground at the bottom, and live to the right.

=== Italy (Type L) ===
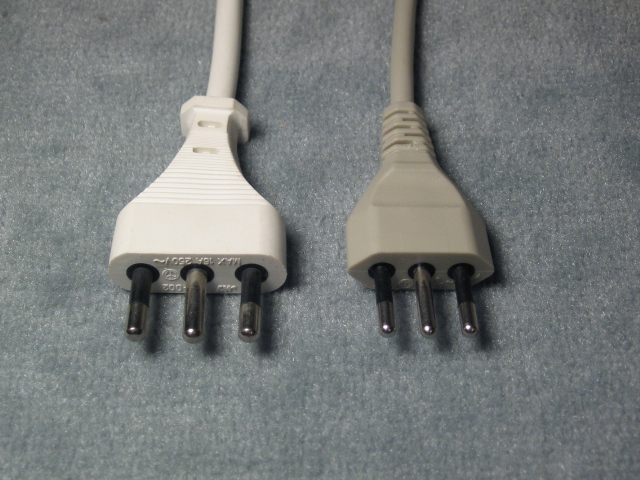
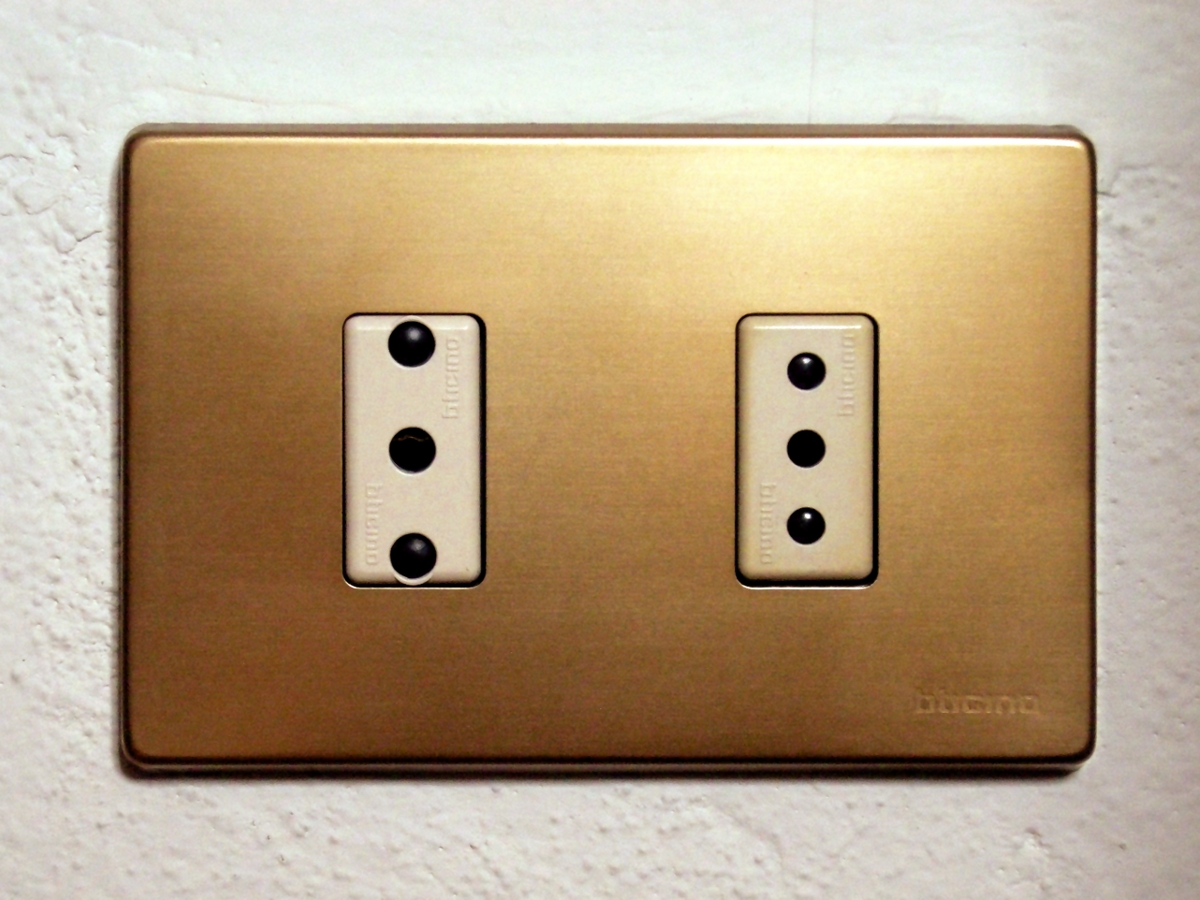
Side by side comparison of Italian CEI 23-50 S17 and S11 plugs and sockets rated 16 A (left) and 10 A (right)

Italian plugs and sockets are defined by the standard CEI 23-50 and referred to as "Type L". This includes models rated at 10 A and 16 A that differ in contact diameter and spacing. Both are symmetrical, allowing the live and neutral contacts to be inserted in either direction. The 10 A plug has 4 mm diameter pins and the centres spaced 19 mm apart, while the 16 A plug has 5 mm diameter pins and the centres spaced 26 mm apart. This plug type is also used in Chile and Uruguay.

The two form factors were initially adopted because up to the second half of the 20th century in many regions of Italy electricity was supplied by means of two separate consumer connections – one for powering illumination and one for other purposes – and these generally operated at different voltages, typically 127 V (a single phase from 220 V three-phase) and 220 V (a single phase from three-phase 380 V or two-phase from 220 V three-phase).

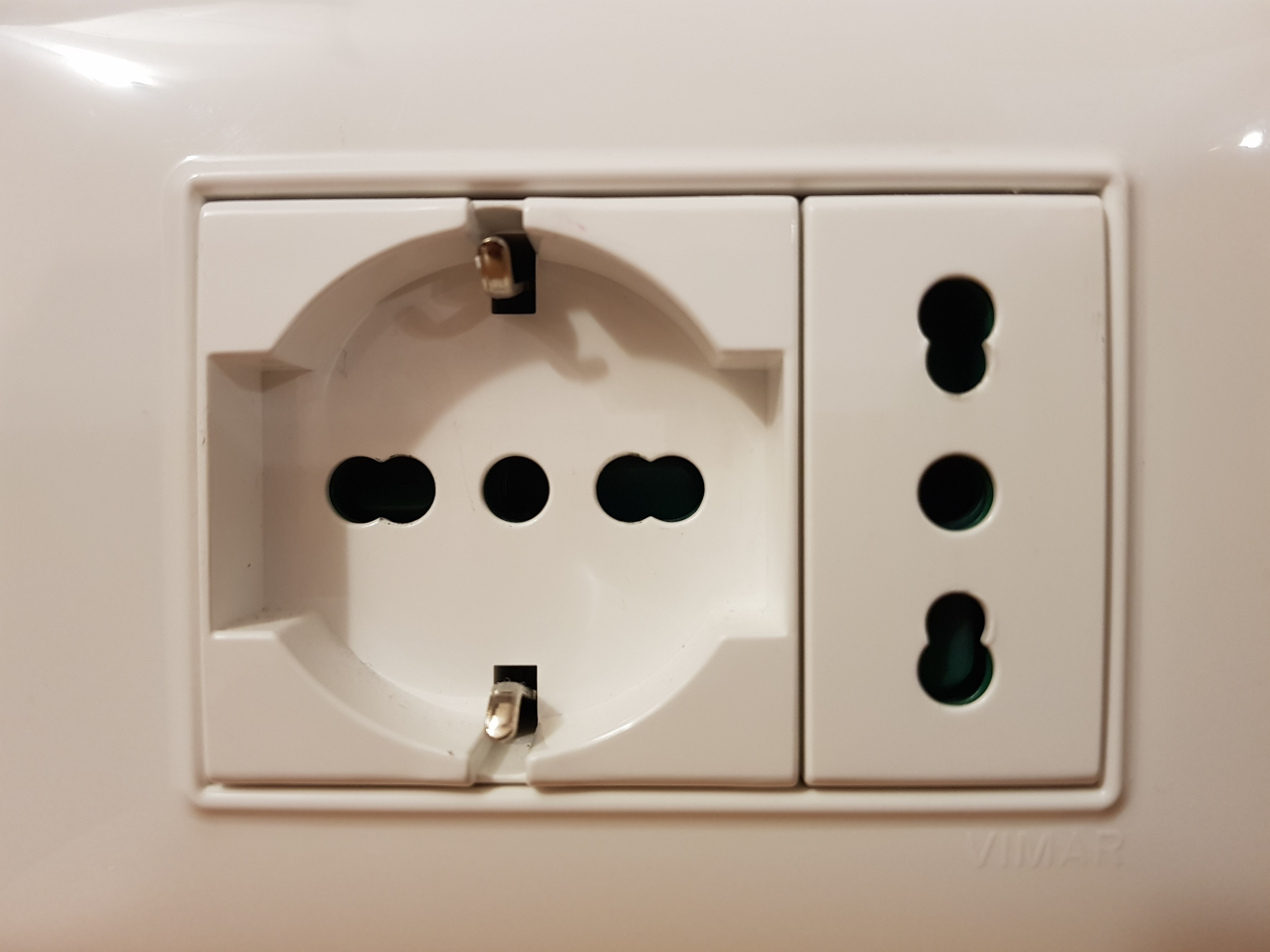
A CEI 23-50 P40 socket (Italian adapted Schuko) next to a CEI 23-50 P17/11 (bipasso) socket in a modern installation

Modern installations in Italy (and in other countries where Type L plugs are used) typically use sockets that accept several plug types. The simplest type, designated CEI 23-50 P17/11, has a central round hole flanked by two figure-8 shaped holes, allowing the insertion of Italian 10 A and 16 A plugs as well as Europlugs. These compact hybrid sockets are known as presa bipasso (twin-gauge socket). A larger, but more flexible hybrid socket is called CEI 23-50 P40. It merges the bipasso form factor with a "Schuko" socket, thus also accepting earthed CEE 7/4 (Schuko) and CEE 7/7 (CEE hybrid) as well as unearthed CEE 7/17 ("contour") plugs.

Many appliances sold in Italy today are equipped with hybrid CEE 7/7 or CEE 7/17 plugs, but only these larger CEI 23-50 P40 sockets will accept them without an adapter. However, adaptors that allow plugging them into smaller sockets are also commonly sold and regulated by a specific standard.

=== North America, Central America and IEC 60906-2 ===
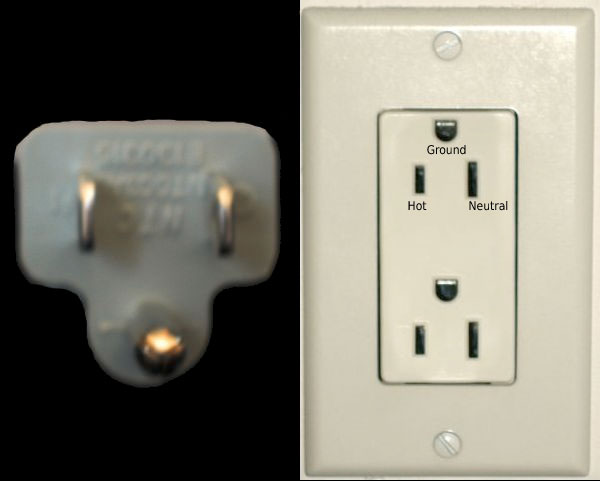
Left: NEMA 5-15 plug. Right: "Decora"-style duplex socket, with ground-pin up orientation specified in NECA 130-2010, center. Photos are different scale – parallel blades are on 1/2-inch (12.7 mm) centers.

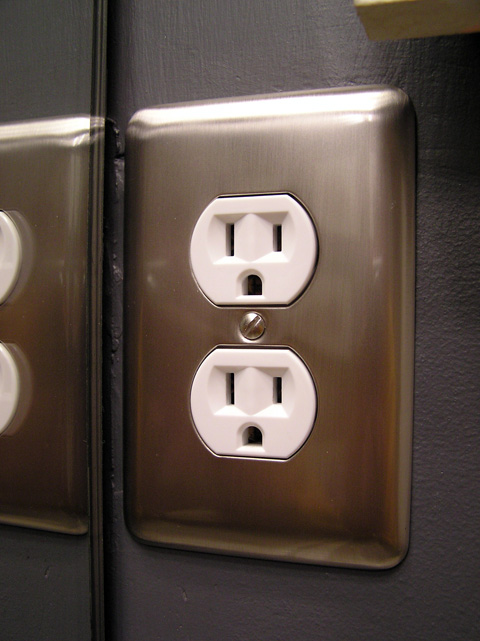
Ordinary duplex socket mounted in ground-pin down orientation.

Most of North America and Central America, and some of South America, use connectors standardized by the National Electrical Manufacturers Association (NEMA). The devices are named using the format NEMA n-mmX, where n is an identifier for the configuration of pins and blades, mm is the maximum current rating, and X is either P for plug or R for receptacle. For example, NEMA 5-15R is a configuration type 5 receptacle supporting 15 A. Corresponding P and R versions are designed to be mated. Within the series, the arrangement and size of pins will differ, to prevent accidental mating of devices with a higher current draw than the receptacle can support.

==== NEMA 1-15 ungrounded (Type A) ====
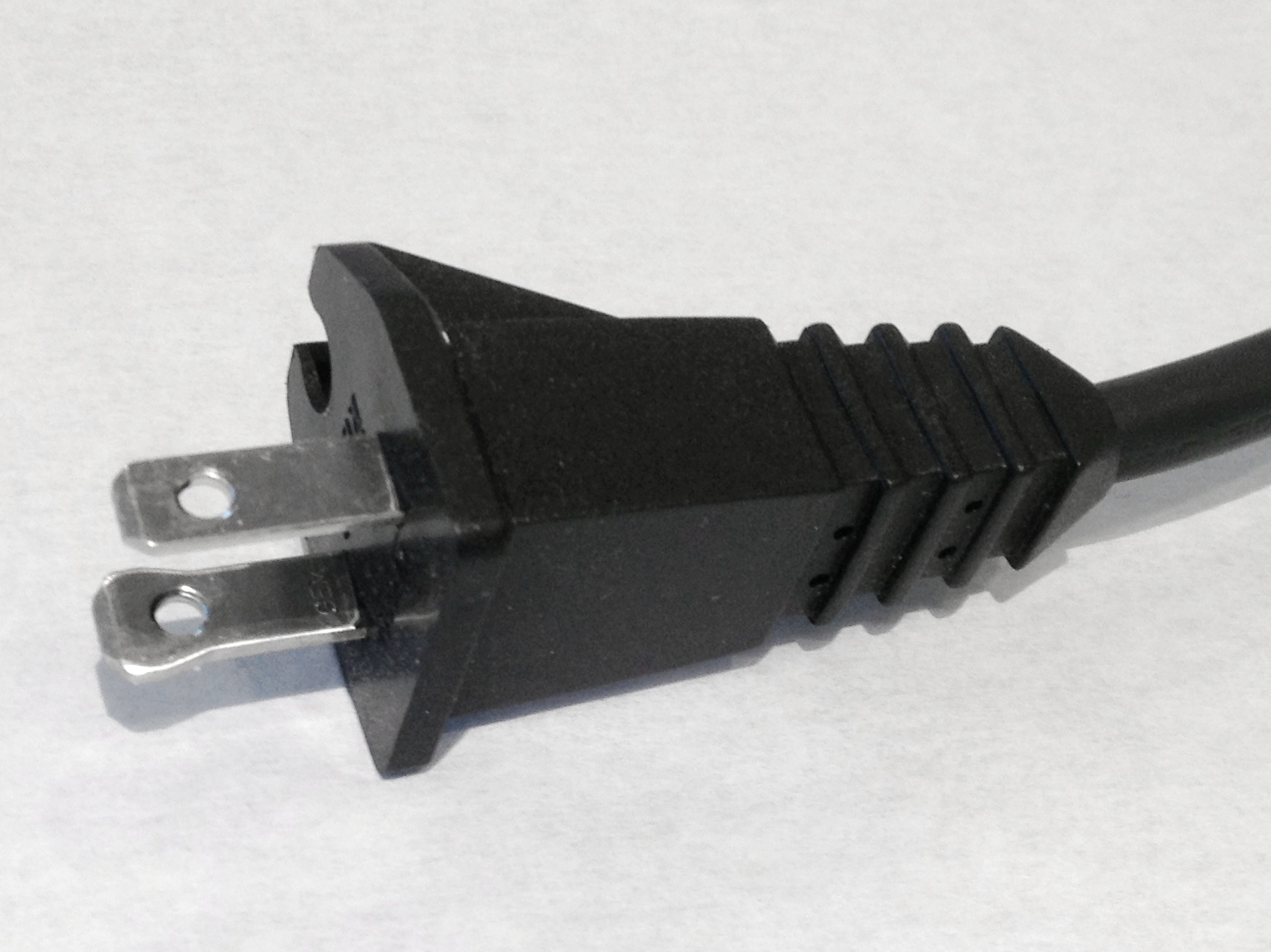
NEMA 1-15 polarized plug

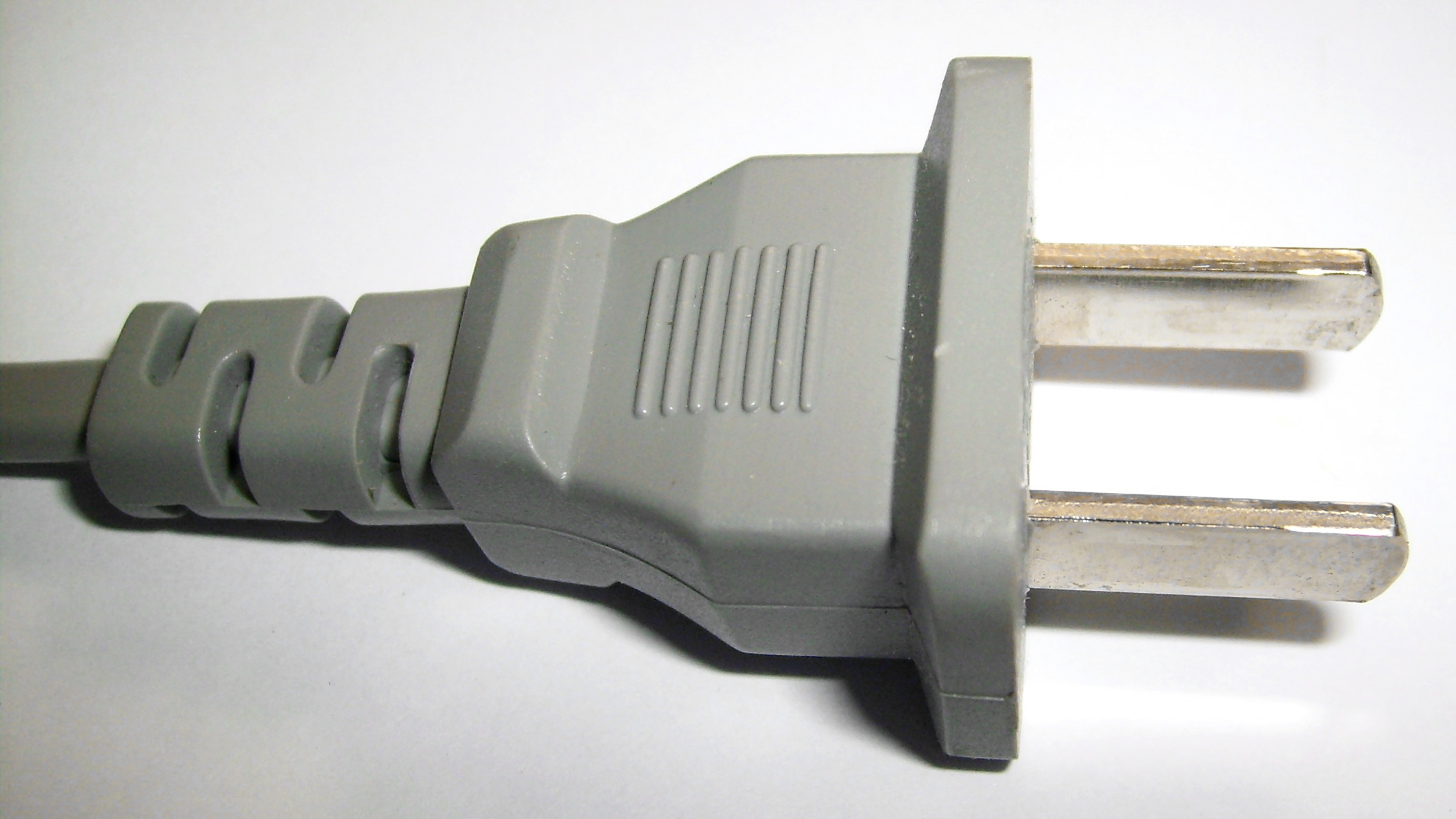
NEMA 1-15 unpolarized plug

NEMA-1 plugs have two parallel blades and are rated 15 A at 125 volts. They provide no ground connection but will fit into a grounding NEMA 5-15 receptacle. Early versions were not polarized, but today most plugs are polarized via a wider neutral blade. (Unpolarized AC adaptors are a common exception.) Harvey Hubbell patented a parallel blade plug in 1913, where the blades were equal width (U.S. patent 1,064,833). In 1916 Hubbell received a patent for a polarized version where one blade was both longer and wider than the other (U.S. patent 1,180,648). In the polarized version of NEMA 1-15, introduced in the 1950s, both blades are the same length, with only the width varying.

Ungrounded NEMA-1 outlets are not permitted in new construction in the United States and Canada, but can still be found in older buildings.

==== NEMA 5-15 grounded (Type B) ====
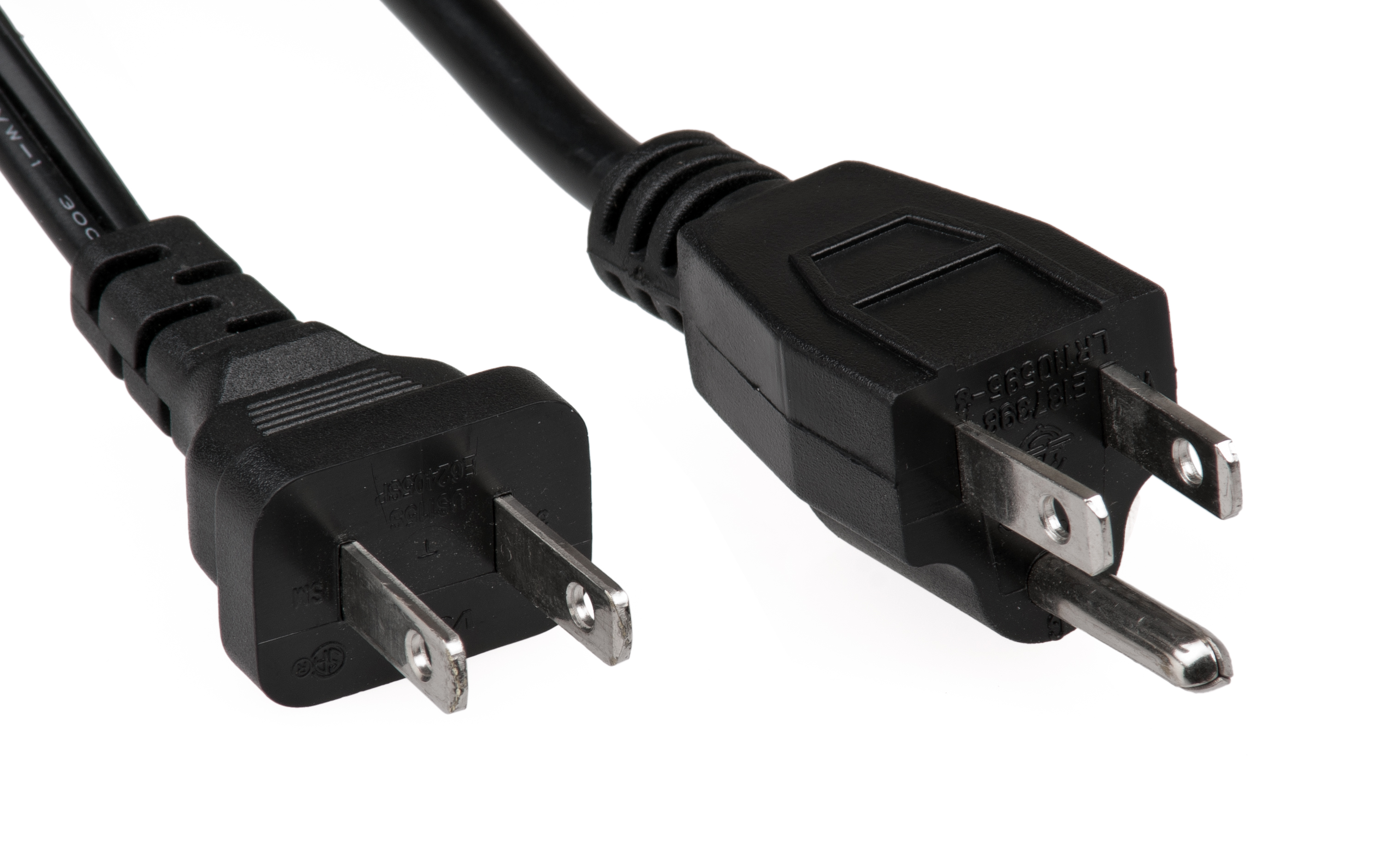
Ungrounded vs grounded NEMA plugs

The NEMA 5-15 plug has two flat parallel blades like NEMA 1-15 and a ground (earth) pin. It is rated 15 A at 125 volts. The ground pin is longer than the live and neutral blades, such that an inserted plug connects to ground before power. The ground hole is officially D-shaped, although some round holes exist and many plugs have round ground pins. Both current-carrying blades on grounding plugs may be narrow, since the ground pin enforces polarity, but outlets have a wider opening for the neutral blade to prevent ungrounded polarized plugs from being put in backwards. This socket is recommended in IEC standard 60906-2 for 120-volt 60 Hz installations.

The National Electrical Contractors Association's installation standard (NEIS 130-2016) requires a consistent orientation for sockets installed together or nearby, but does not prescribe any specific orientation. In practice, most sockets are mounted with the ground contact below the other contacts. This ground-down orientation has been called the "sad socket", "dismayed face", or "shocked face" – names which reflect pareidolia.

Tamper-resistant sockets may be required in new residential construction, with shutters on the power blade sockets to prevent contact by objects inserted into the socket.

In stage lighting, this connector is sometimes known as PBG for Parallel Blade with Ground, Edison or Hubbell, the name of a common manufacturer.

==== NEMA 5-20 ====
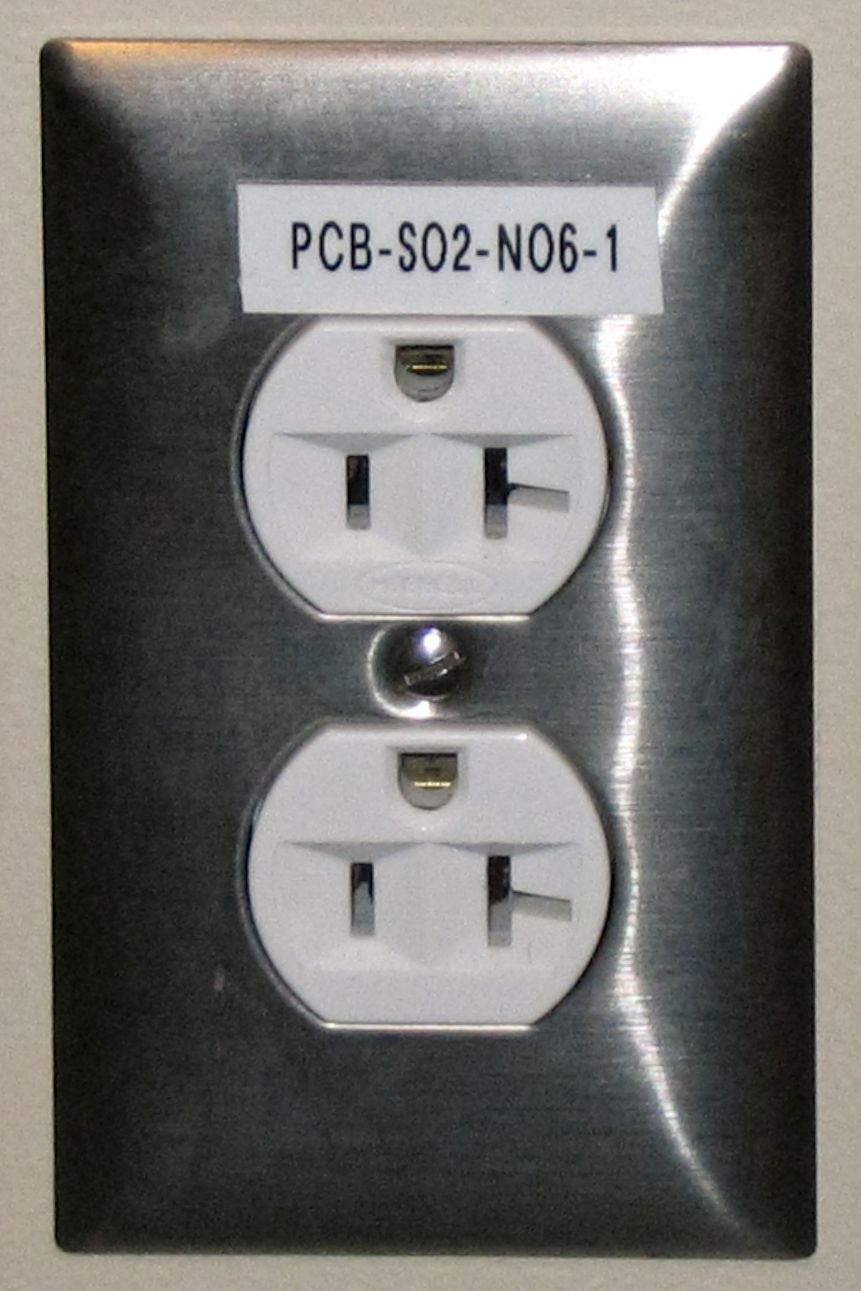
5-20RA (Canada) or 5-20R (US) T-slot socket mounted with the earth hole up. The neutral connection is the wider T-shaped slot on the right.

The NEMA 5-20 AP variant has blades perpendicular to each other. The receptacle has a T-slot for the neutral blade which accepts either 15 A parallel-blade plugs or 20 A plugs.

==== NEMA 14-50 ====
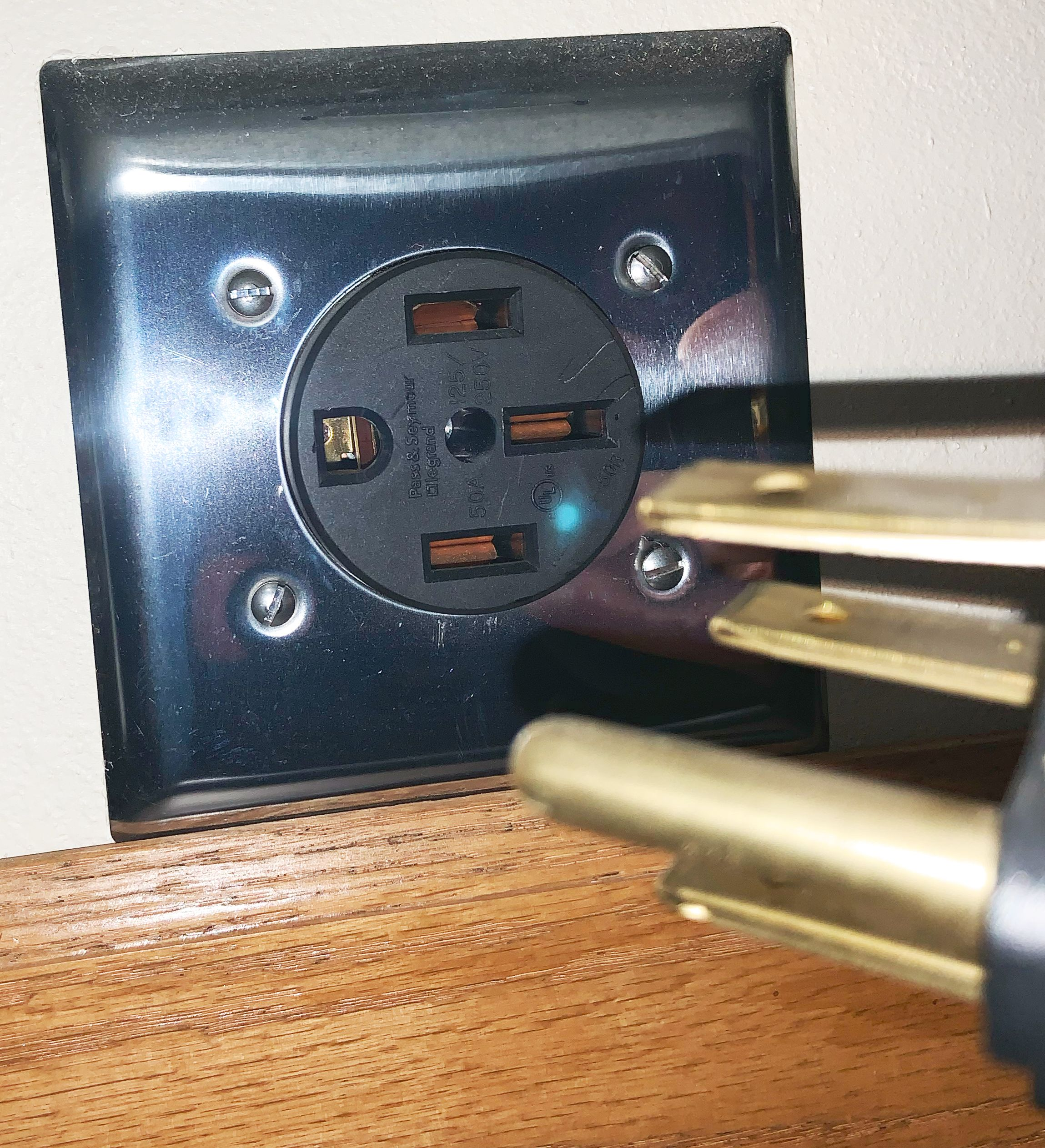
NEMA 14-50 outlet

NEMA 14-50 devices are frequently found in RV parks, since they are used for "shore power" connections of larger recreational vehicles. Also, it was formerly common to connect mobile homes to utility power via a 14-50 device. Newer applications include Tesla's Mobile Connector for vehicle charging, which formally recommended the installation of a 14-50 receptacle for home use.

==== Other NEMA types ====
240 V 20-, 30- and 50-amp rated sockets are often used for high-current appliances such as air conditioners, clothes dryers and electric stoves, respectively.

==== JIS C 8303, Class II unearthed ====
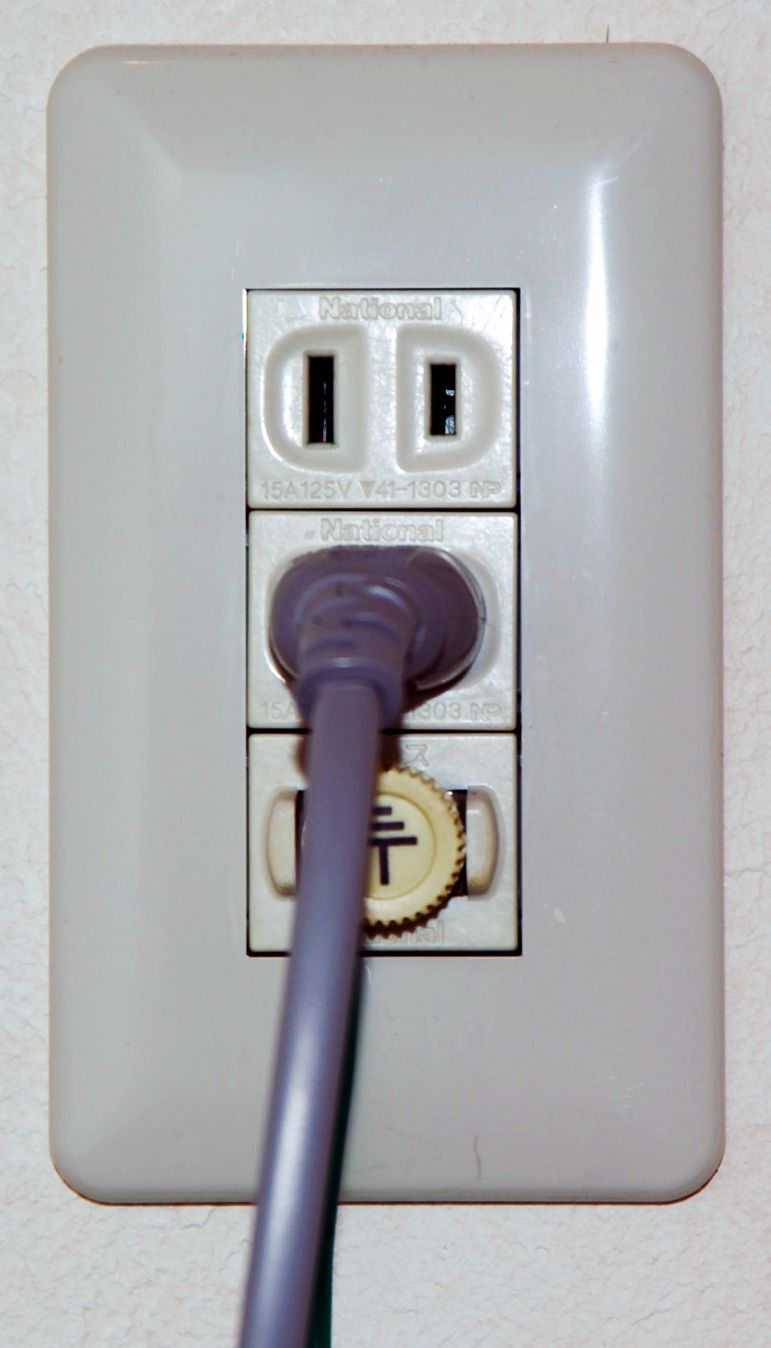
Japanese Class II polarized sockets with earth post, for a washing machine (similar to NEMA 1-15)

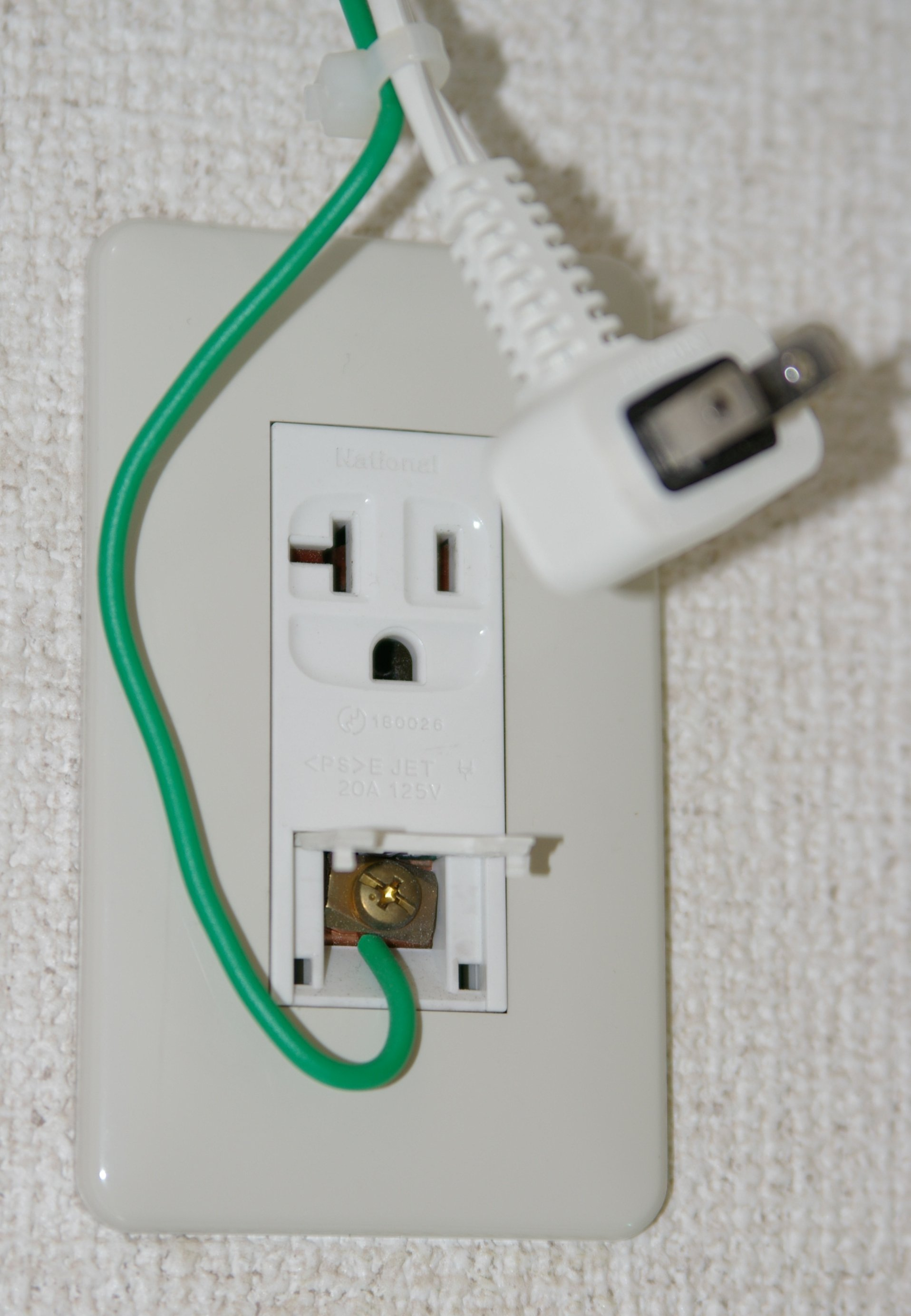
Japanese 20 A socket with earth post and earth connector, for an air conditioner (similar to NEMA 5-20)

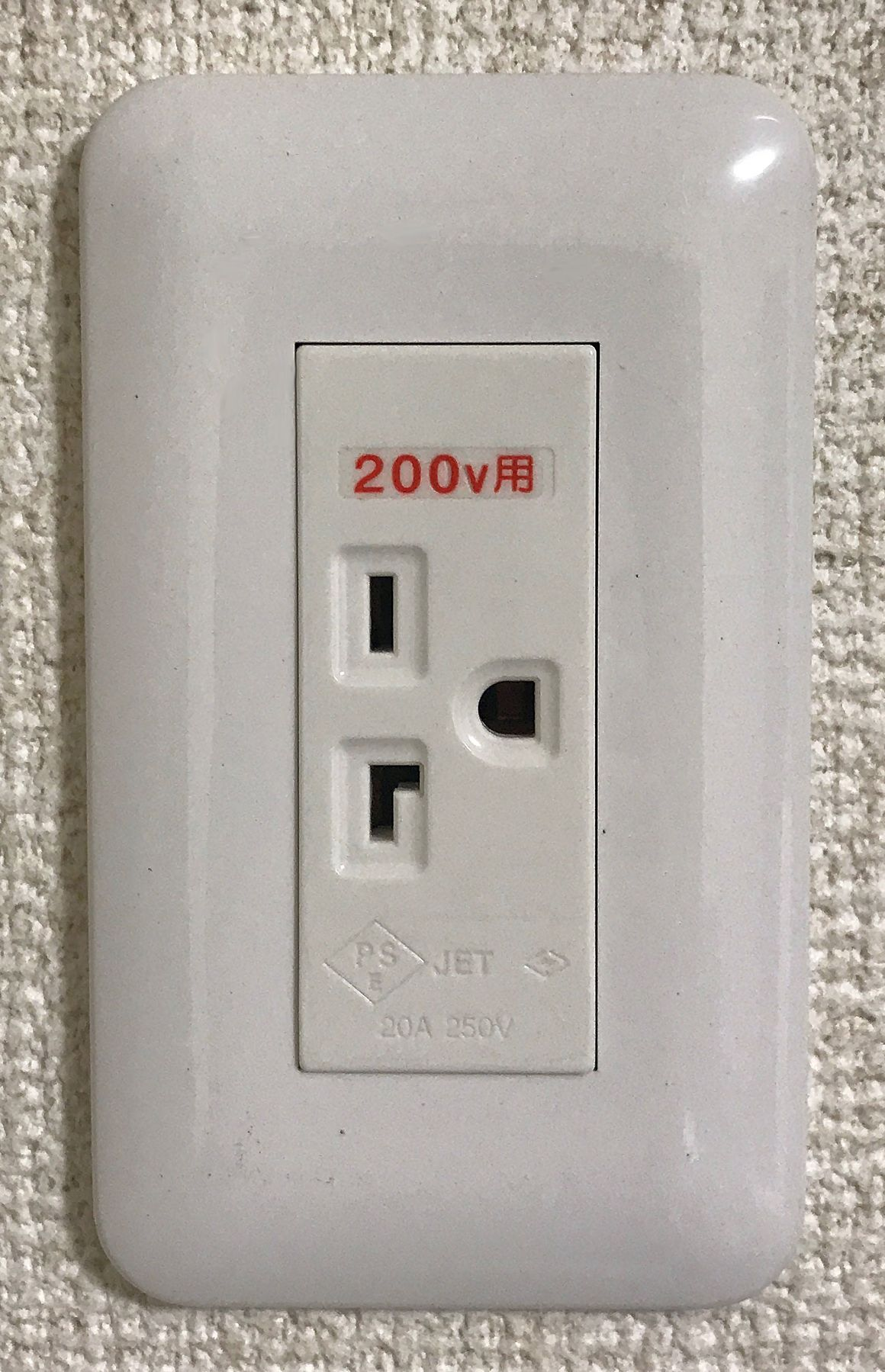
Japanese 200 V socket with earth slot, for an air conditioner (similar to NEMA 6-20)

The Japanese Class II plug and socket appear physically identical to NEMA 1-15 and also carries 15 A. The relevant Japanese Industrial Standards, JIS C 8303, imposes stricter dimensional requirements for the plug housing, different marking requirements, and mandatory testing and type approval.

Older Japanese sockets and multi-plug adaptors are unpolarized—the slots in the sockets are the same size—and will accept only unpolarized plugs. Japanese plugs generally fit into most North American sockets without modification, but polarized North American plugs may require adaptors or replacement non-polarized plugs to connect to older Japanese sockets. In Japan the voltage is 100 V, and the frequency is either 50 Hz (Eastern Japan: Tokyo, Yokohama, Tohoku, Kawasaki, Sapporo, Sendai and Hokkaido) or 60 Hz (Western Japan: Osaka, Kyoto, Nagoya, Shikoku, Kyushu and Hiroshima) depending on whether the customer is located on the Osaka or Tokyo grid. Therefore, some North American devices which can be physically plugged into Japanese sockets may not function properly.

==== JIS C 8303, Class I earthed ====
Japan also uses a grounded plug similar to the North American NEMA 5-15. However, it is less common than its NEMA 1-15 equivalent. Since 2005, new Japanese homes are required to have class I grounded sockets for connecting domestic appliances. This rule does not apply for sockets not intended to be used for domestic appliances, but it is strongly advised to have class I sockets throughout the home.

=== Swiss SN 441011 (Type J) ===
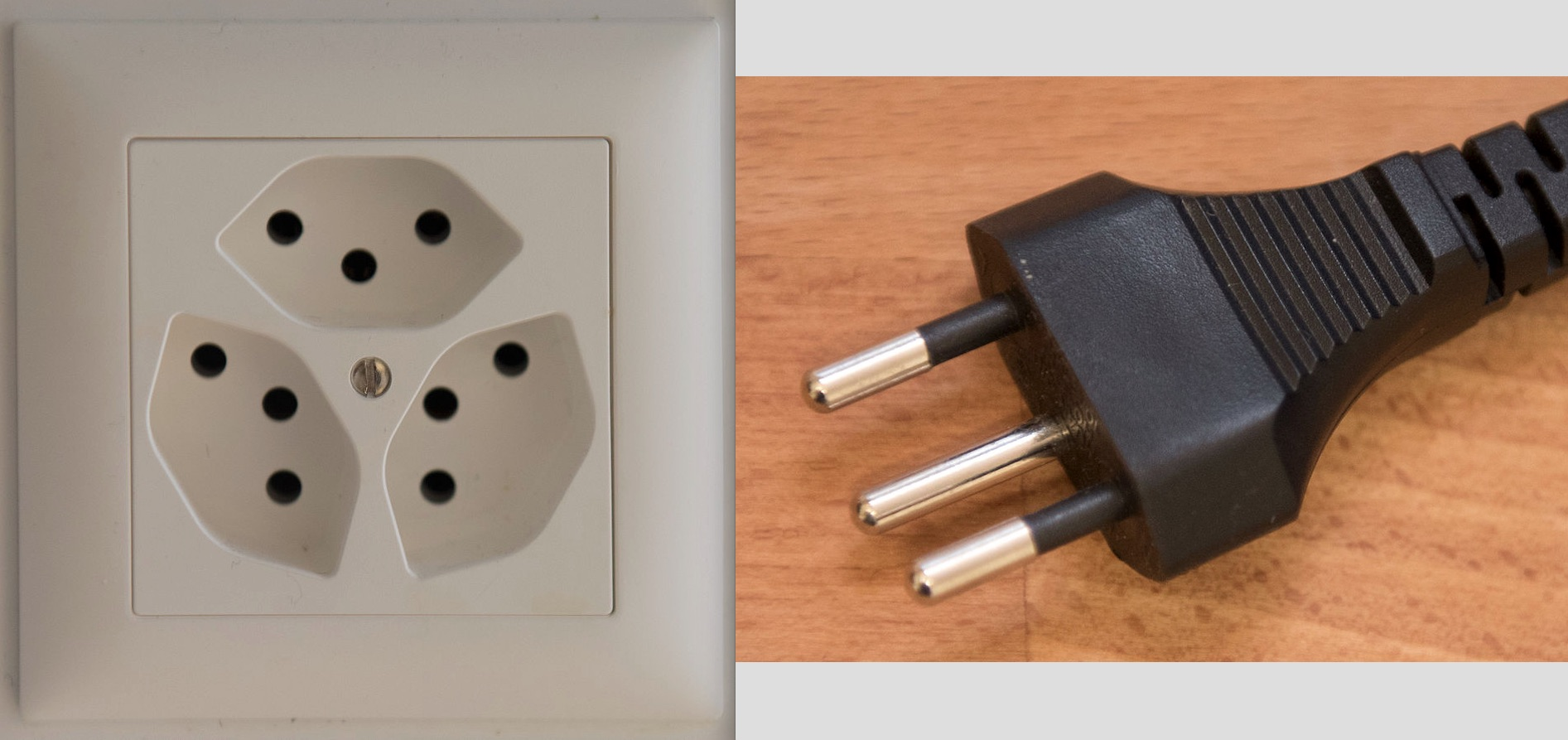
Type J: The 10 ampere SN 441011 type 13 socket (here: a triple socket) and type 12 plug

The Swiss standard, also used in Liechtenstein, is SN 441011 (SN SEV 1011 until 2019) Plugs and socket-outlets for household and similar purposes. The standard defines a hierarchical system of plugs and sockets with two, three and five pins, and 10 A or 16 A ratings. Sockets will accept plugs with the same or fewer pins and the same or lower ratings. The standard does not require the use of child protective shutters.

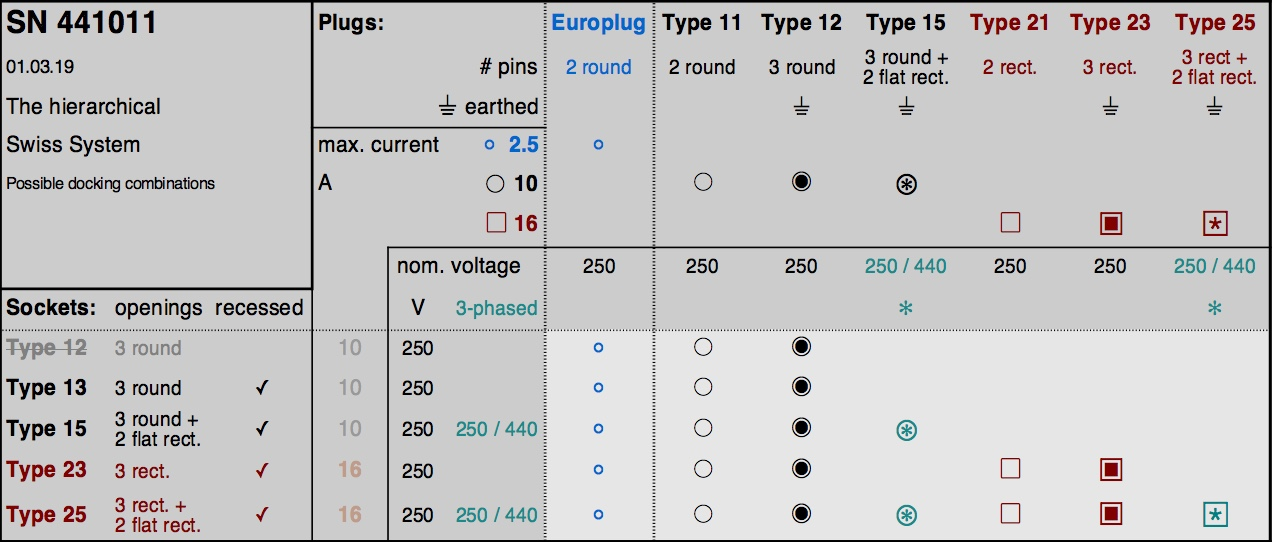
Overview of the hierarchical Swiss system

==== 10 A plugs and sockets (Type J) ====
SN 441011 defines a "Type 1x" series of 10 A plugs and sockets. The type 11 plug is unearthed, with two 4 mm diameter round pins spaced 19 mm apart. The type 12 plug adds a central 4 mm diameter round earth pin, offset by 5 mm. The obsolete type 12 socket had no recess, while the newer type 13 socket is recessed. Both sockets will accept type 11 and type 12 plugs, and also the 2.5 A Europlug. Earlier type 11 and 12 plugs had live and neutral pins without sleeved pins, which present a shock hazard when partially inserted into non-recessed sockets. The IEC Type J designation refers to SEV 1011's type 12 plugs and type 13 sockets.

Unique to Switzerland is a three-phase power socket compatible with single-phase plugs: The type 15 plug has three round pins, of the same dimensions as type 12, plus two smaller flat rectangular pins for two additional power phases. The type 15 socket is recessed, and has five openings (three round and two flat rectangular). It will accept plugs of types 11, 12, 15 and the Europlug.

==== 16 A plugs and sockets ====
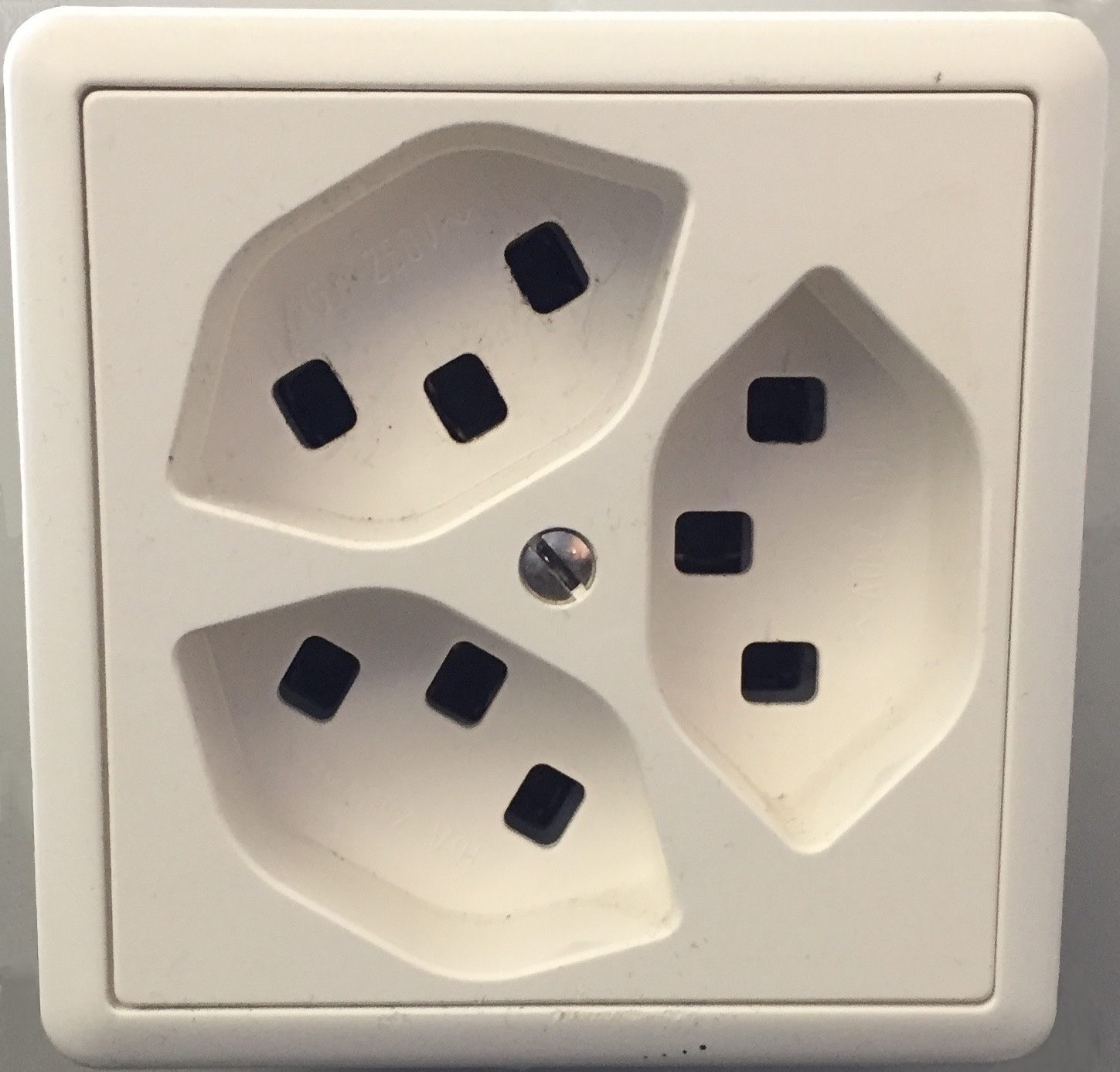
Three-way Type 23 16-amp socket (SEV 1011)

SN 441011 also defines a "Type 2x" series of 16 A plugs and sockets. These are the same as their 10 A "Type 1x" counterparts, but replace the round pins with 4 mm × 5 mm rectangular pins. The sockets will also accept "Type 1x" plugs. The unearthed type 21 plug has two rectangular pins, with centres 19 mm apart. The type 23 plug adds a central rectangular earth pin, offset by 5 mm. The recessed type 23 socket will accept plugs of types 11, 12, 21, 23 and the Europlug.

Again, the three-phase power socket is compatible with single-phase plugs, either of 10 A or 16 A ratings. The type 25 plug has three rectangular pins of the same dimensions as type 23, plus two rectangular pins of the same dimensions as type 15. The corresponding type 25 socket is recessed and will accept all Swiss plug types as well as the Europlug.

=== Thai plug TIS 166-2549 (Type O) ===
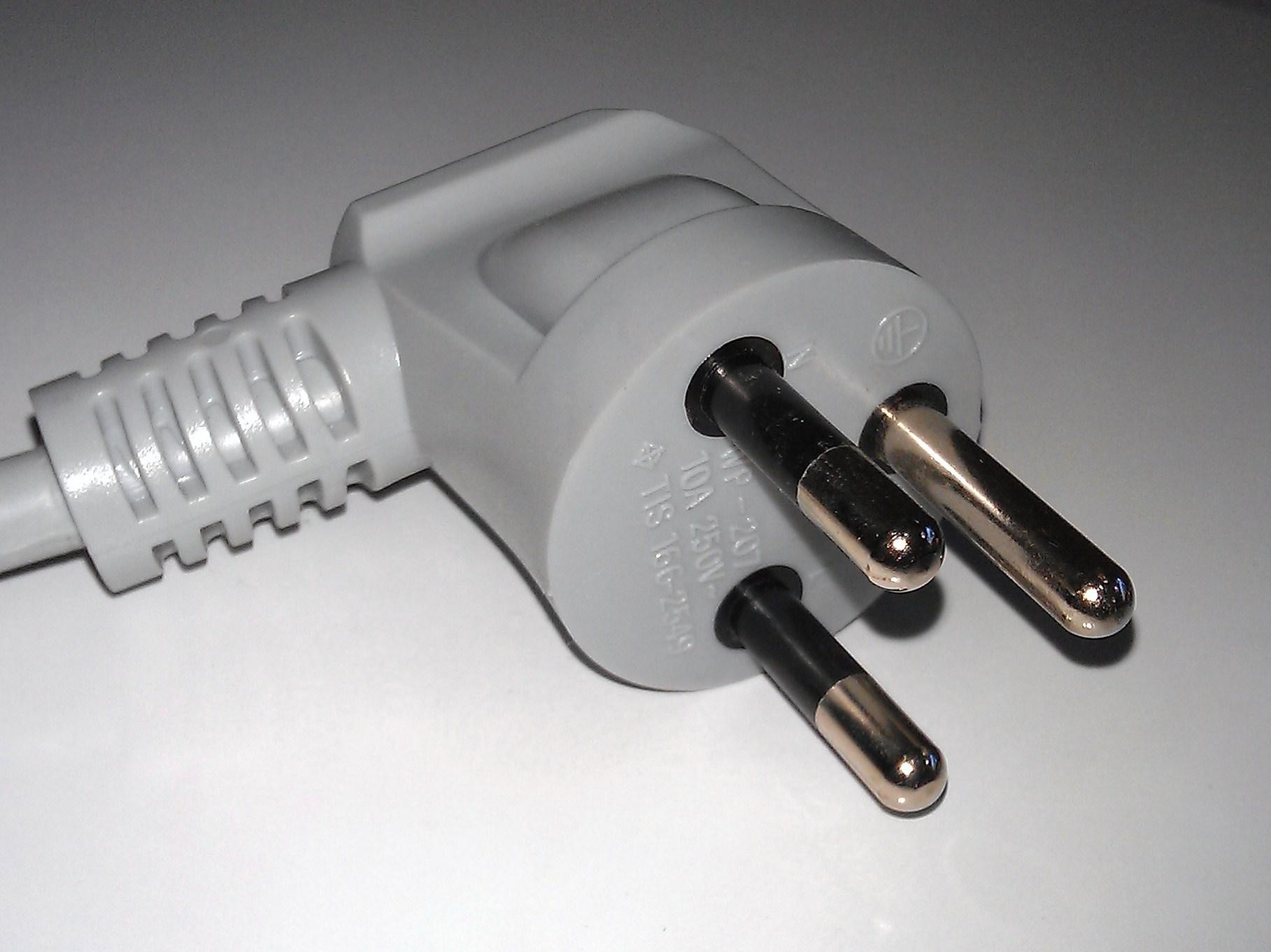
TIS 166-2549 plug (grounded variant)

Thai Industrial Standard (TIS) 166-2547 and its subsequent update TIS 166-2549 replaced prior standards which were based on NEMA 1-15 and 5-15, as Thailand uses 230 V electricity. The plug has two round power pins 4.8 mm in diameter and 19 mm in length, insulated for 10 mm and spaced 19 mm apart, with an earthing pin of the same diameter and 21.4 mm in length, located 11.89 mm from the line connecting the two power pins. The earth pin spacing corresponds to that of NEMA 5 and provides compatibility with prior hybrid three-pin sockets, which accept NEMA 1-15, NEMA 5-15, and Europlugs, all of which have been variably used in Thailand.

The standard also defines an ungrounded plug with a smaller form factor that is very similar to the Europlug (but a bit higher); its power pins are identical to the grounded variant and both are rated for up to 16 A (while the Europlug is only rated for 2.5 A). The generally used hybrid socket is also defined in TIS 166-2547, in addition to a plain three-round-pin socket, with plans to eventually replace the former and phase out support for NEMA-compatible plugs. Sockets are polarized (as in NEMA 5-15).

The grounded plug is similar to, but not interchangeable with, the Israeli SI32 plug. The Thai plug is designated as "Type O" at IEC World Plugs.

=== Special purpose plugs and sockets ===
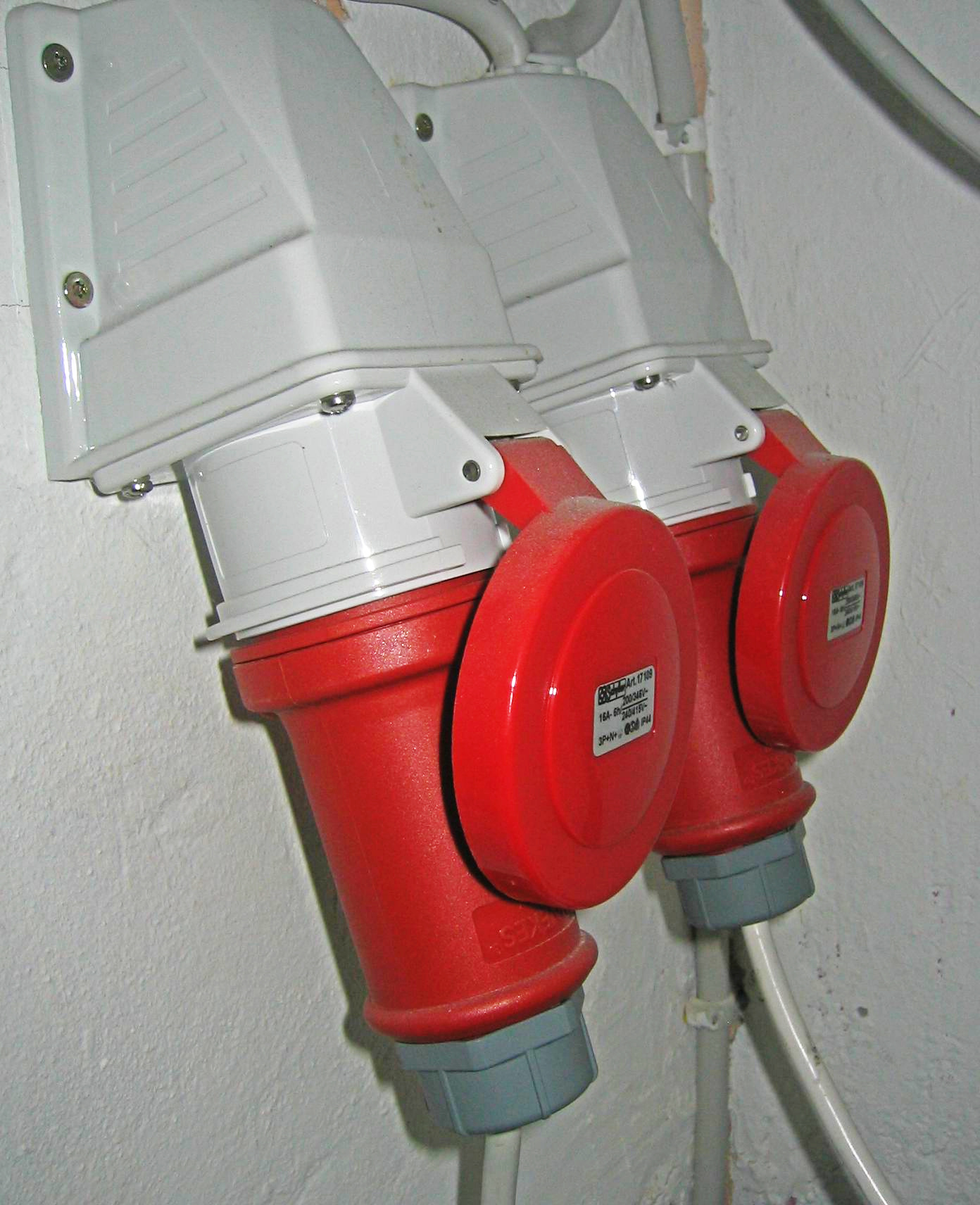
400 V CEE sockets with cables plugged in.

Special purpose sockets may be found in residential, industrial, commercial or institutional buildings. Examples of systems using special purpose sockets include:

- "Clean" (low electrical noise) earth for use with computer systems,
- Device for Connection of Luminaires (DCL) is a European standard for ceiling- and hanging light fixtures.
- Emergency power supply,
- Uninterruptible power supply for critical or life-support equipment,
- Isolated power for medical instruments, tools used in wet conditions, or electric razors,
- "Balanced" or "technical" power used in audio and video production studios,
- Theatrical lighting,
- CEE 17 are a series of industrial grade (IP44) three-phase "pin & sleeve" connectors for industrial purposes, carpentry- and gardening appliances and also used as a weather-resistant connector for outdoor usage, like Caravans, Motorhomes, campervans and tents for mains hook-up at camp-sites.
- Sockets for electric clothes dryers, electric ovens, and air conditioners with higher current rating.

Special-purpose sockets may be labelled or coloured to identify a reserved use of a system, or may have keys or specially shaped pins to prevent use of unintended equipment.

==== Single-phase electric stove plugs and sockets ====
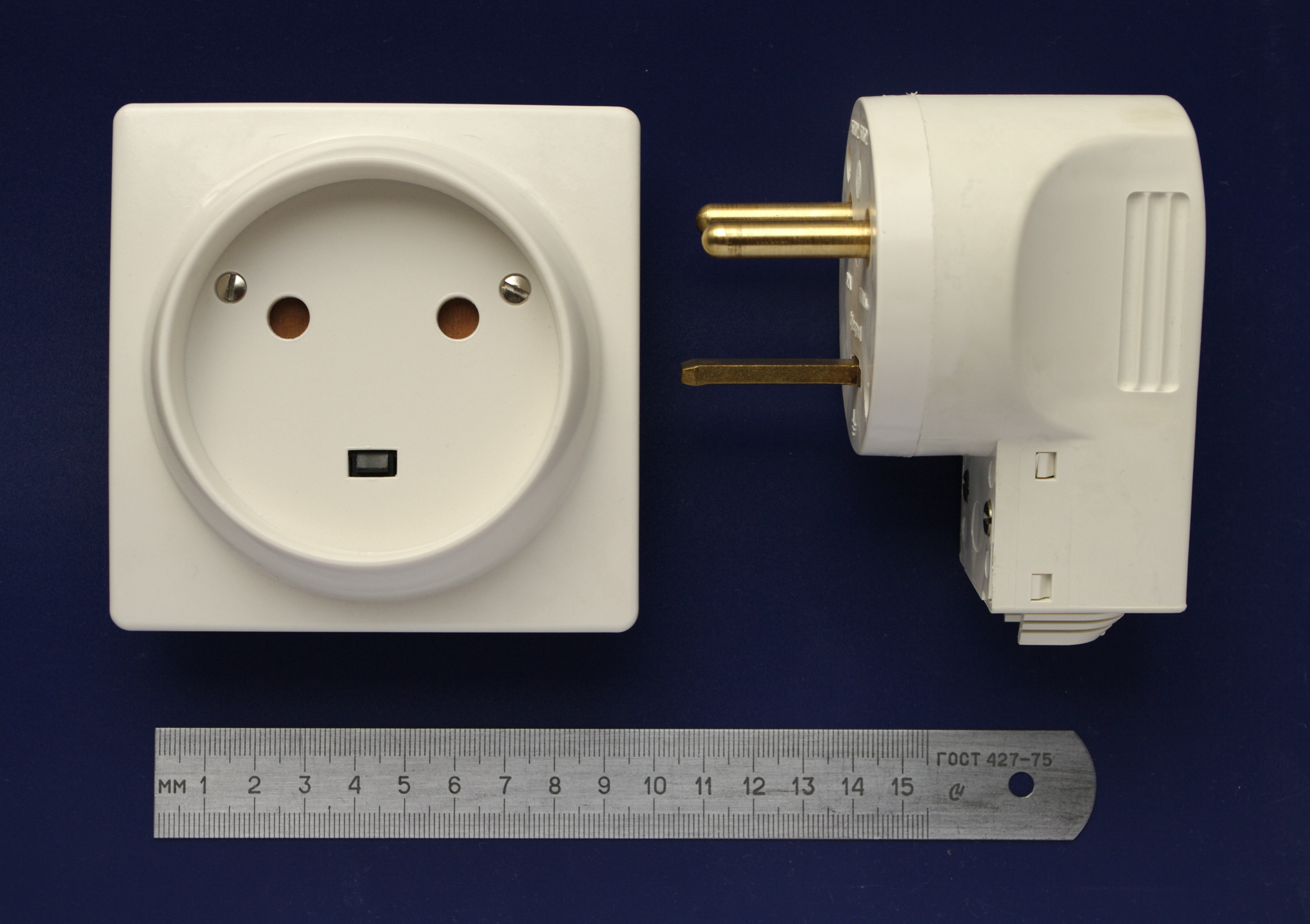
Plug (sheet V) and socket (sheet VI) to French standard NF C 61-315 (400 V, 32 A)

The plugs and sockets used to power electric stoves from a single-phase line have to be rated for greater current values than those used with three-phase supply because all the power has to be transferred through two contacts, not three. If not hardwired to the supply, electric stoves may be connected to the mains with an appropriate high power connector. Some countries do not have wiring regulations for single-phase electric stoves. In Russia, an electric stove can often be seen connected with a 25, 32, or even 40 A connector.

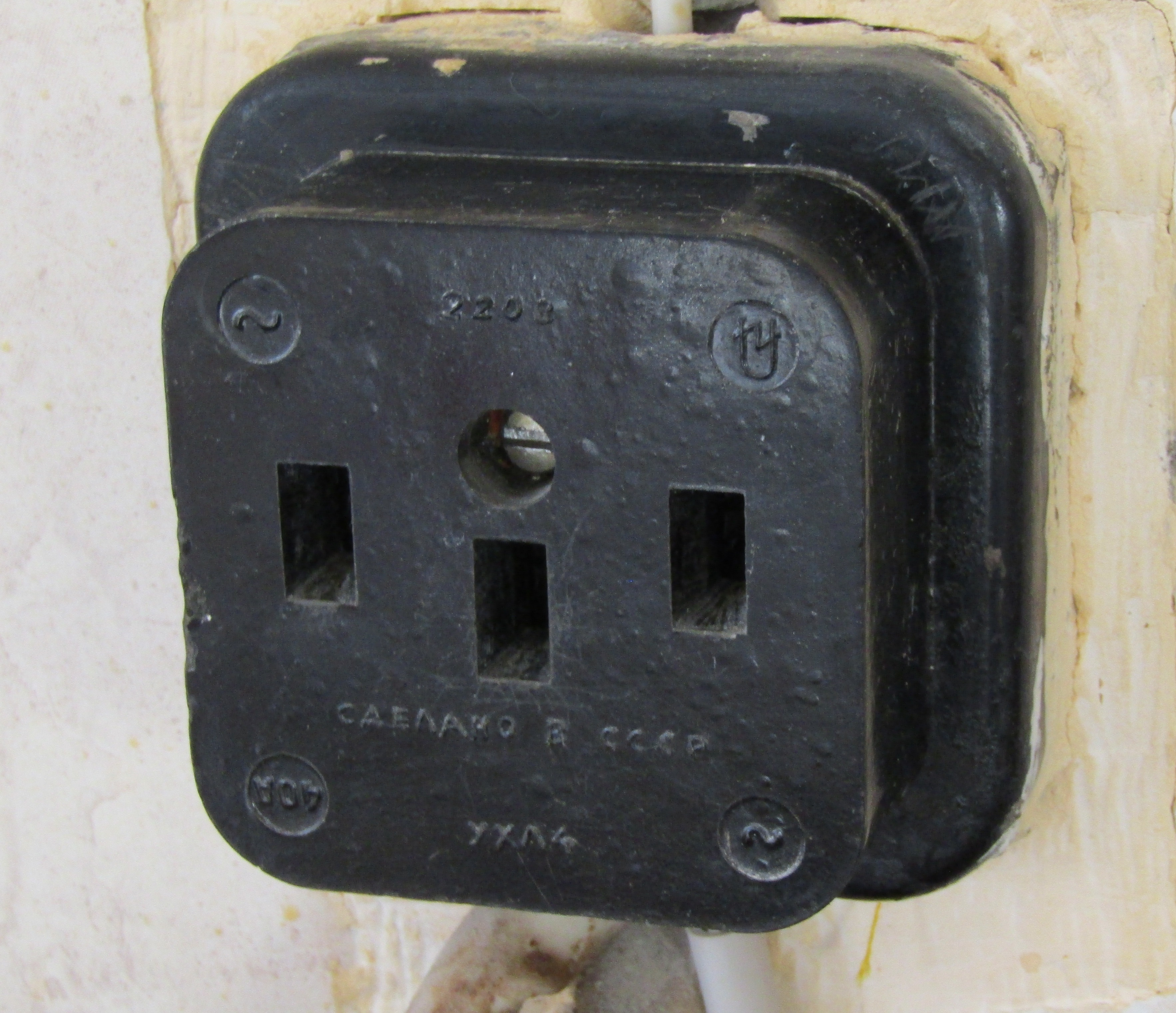
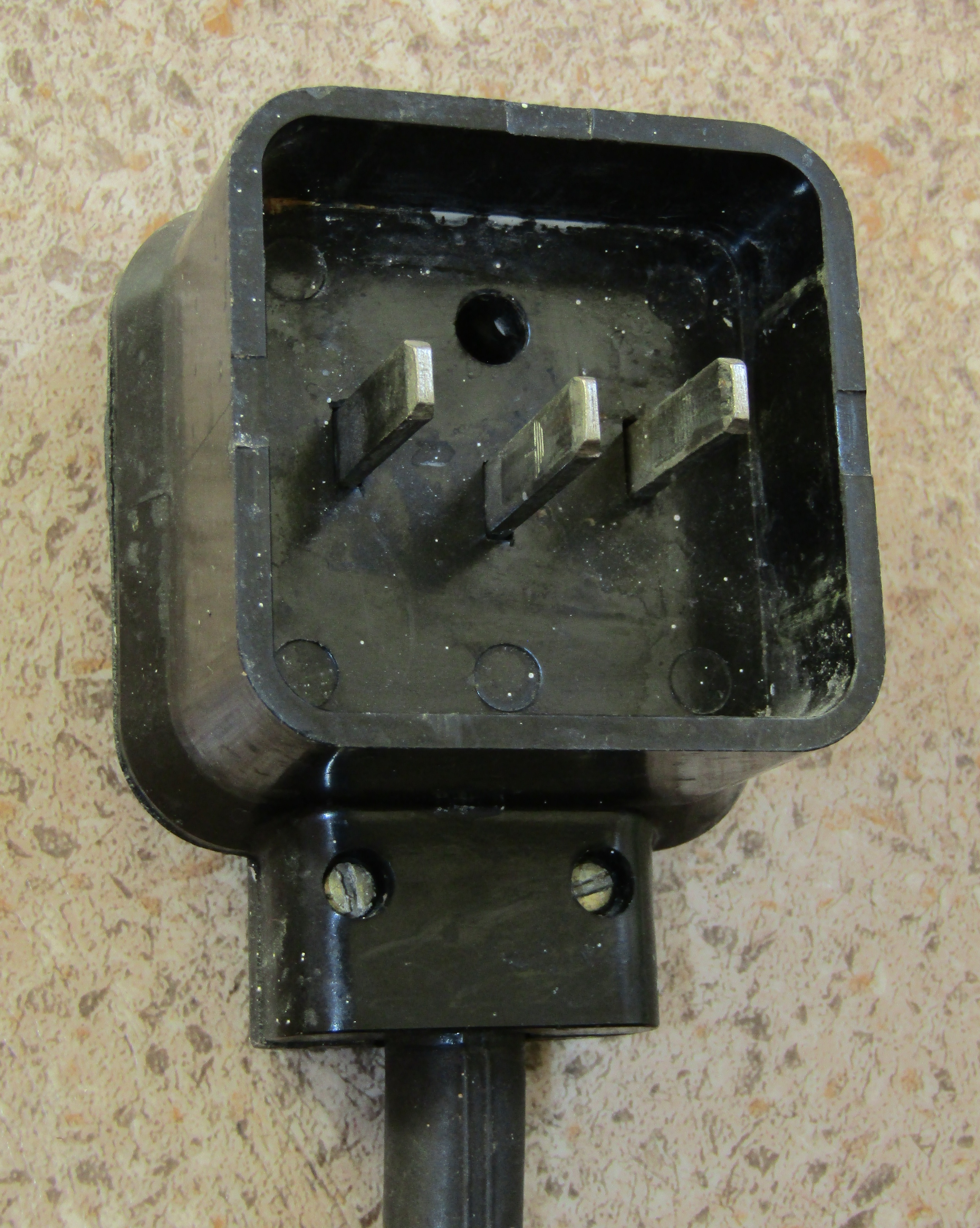
Russian stove connectors rated 220 V, 40 A. Left: Socket. Right: Plug.

In Norway, a 25 A grounded connector, rectangular shaped with rounded corners, is used for single-phase stoves. The connector has three rectangular pins in a row, with the grounding pin longer than other two. The corresponding socket is recessed to prevent shocks. The Norwegian standard is NEK 502:2005 – standard sheet X (socket) and sheet XI (plug).

==== Shaver supply units ====
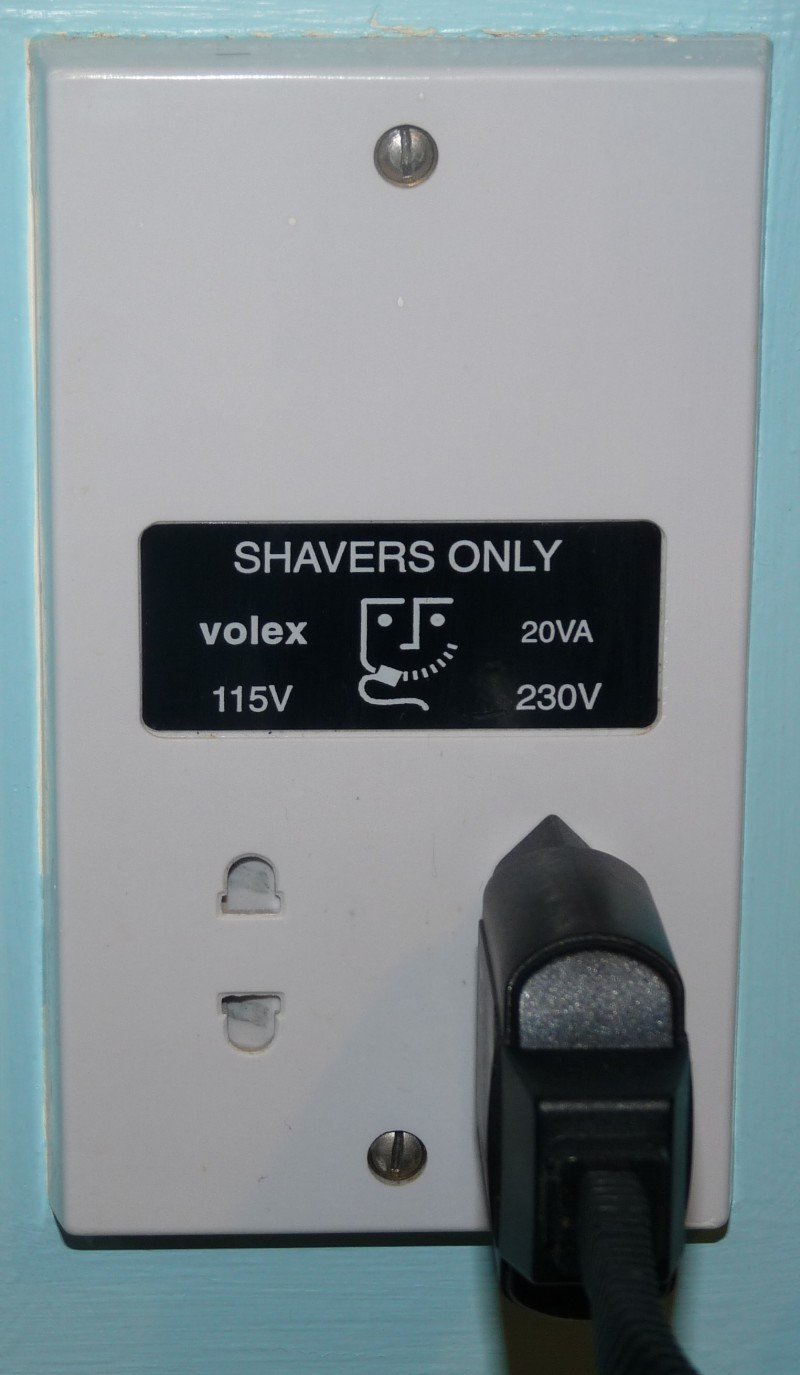
Dual-voltage shaver supply unit for BS 4573, US Type A, Australian two-pin, and Europlug Type C

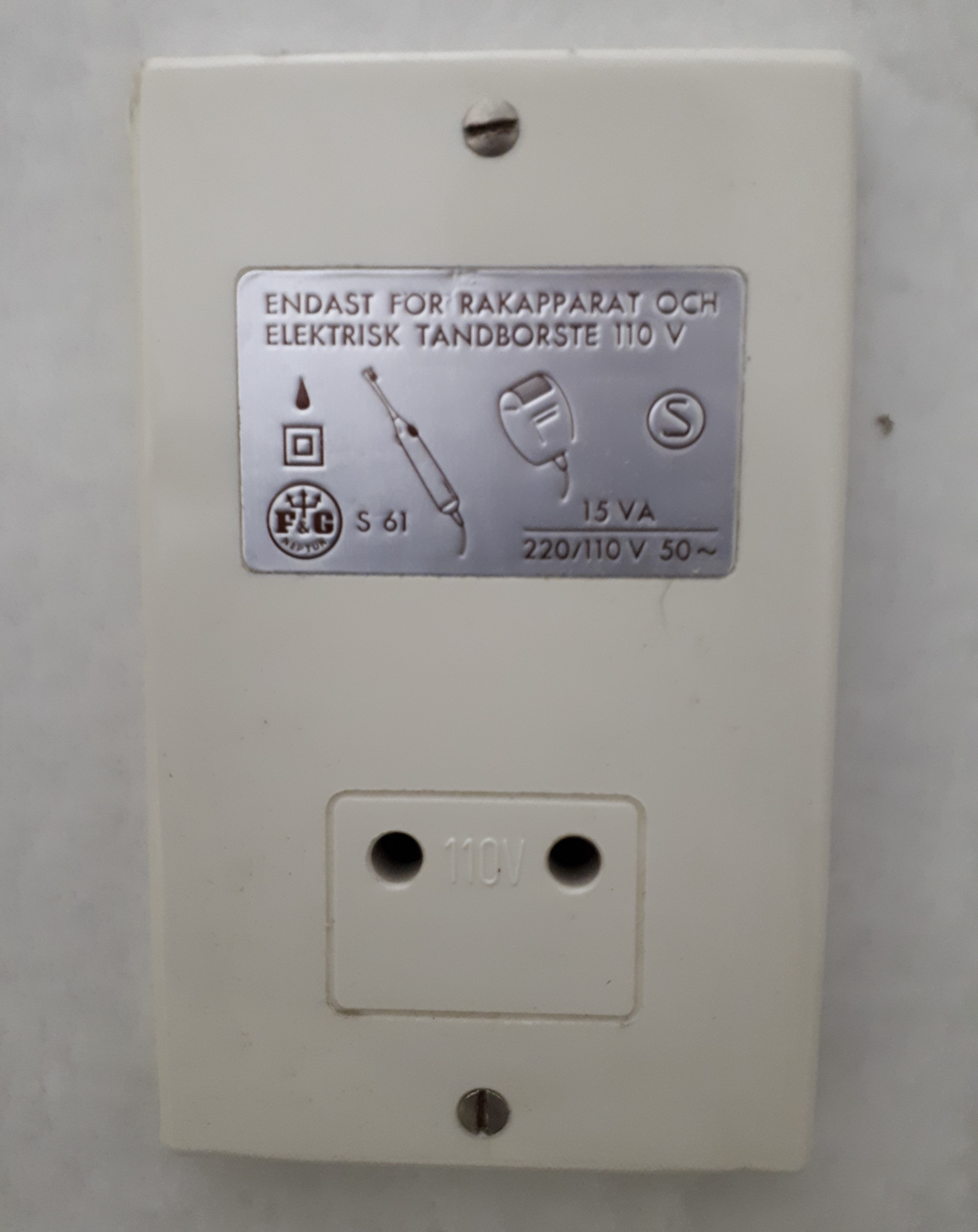
Dual-voltage shaver supply unit in Sweden

National wiring regulations sometimes prohibit the use of sockets adjacent to water taps, etc. A special socket, with an isolation transformer, may allow electric razors to be used near a sink. Because the isolation transformer is of low rating, such outlets are not suitable to operate higher-powered appliances such as hair dryers.

An IEC standard 61558-2-5, adopted by CENELEC and as a national standard in some countries, describes one type of shaver supply unit. Shaver sockets may accept multiple two-pin plug types including Australian (Type I) and BS 4573. The isolation transformer often includes a 115 V output accepting two-pin US plugs (Type A). Shaver supply units must also be current limited, IEC 61558-2-5 specifies a minimum rating of 20 VA and maximum of 50 VA. Sockets are marked with a shaver symbol, and may also say "shavers only".

Isolation transformers and dedicated NEMA 1-15 shaver receptacles were once standard installation practice in North America, but now a GFCI receptacle is used instead. This provides the full capacity of a standard receptacle but protects the user of a razor or other appliance from leakage current.

Though BS 4573 plugs look similar to Europlugs (Type C), there are subtle differences between them. While the BS 4573 plug has round 5 mm contacts, spaced at 16 mm, the Europlug has 4 mm contacts, spaced at (roughly) 19 mm. In order to insert a Europlug into a BS 4573 socket, an adaptor should be used.

== Comparison of standard types ==
IEC TR 60083 World Plugs Type (Note: Type letters are from the IEC website that provides classification letters similar to a United States Department of Commerce publication that sees widespread but not universal use to differentiate plug and socket types based on rough mechanical compatibility. Most common household plugs have an associated letter.)	Standard	Origin	Rating		Earthed (grounded)	Polarized	Fused	Insulated pins	Recessed socket	Socket accepts Europlug
A	NEMA 1-15	American and Canadian	15 A	125 V	No	Optional (Note: Polarized plugs have a wider neutral blade; sockets accept both polarized and unpolarized plugs.)	No	No	No	No
A	JIS C 8303, Class II	Japanese	15 A	125 V	No	Optional	No	No	No	No
A	CNS 690, CNS 15767-1 & CNS 15872	Taiwanese	15 A	125 V	No	Optional	No	No	No	No
A	GB 1002	Chinese	10 A	250 V	No	No	No	Optional (Note: Will become mandatory in 2027.)	No	No
B	NEMA 5-15	American and Canadian	15 A	125 V	Yes (Note: Will accept unearthed plugs.)	Yes	No	No	No	No
B	JIS C 8303, Class I	Japanese	15 A	125 V	Yes	Yes	No	No	No	No
B	CNS 690, CNS 15767-1 & CNS 15872	Taiwanese	15 A	125 V	Yes	Yes	No	No	No	No
C	CEE 7/16	Europlug	2.5 A	250 V	No	No	No	Yes	—N/a (Note: Standard does not define a socket.)	—N/a
—N/a	CEE 7/17 plug (Note: CEE 7/17 specifies an unearthed hybrid plug that fits into both the CEE 7/3 and CEE 7/5 sockets.)	French / German hybrid	16 A	250 V	No	No (Note: There are some CEE 7/17 plugs with special shape which are polarized when used with CEE 7/5 sockets (mechanically only).)	No	No (Note: The recess provided by CEE 7/3 and CEE 7/5 sockets offers protection against touching the live pins of CEE 7/4, CEE 7/6, CEE 7/7, and CEE 7/17 plugs. When used in CEE 7/1 (unearthed) sockets or "universal adaptors" there is no protection for those plugs.)	—N/a	—N/a
—N/a	CEE 7/1 socket & CEE 7/2 plug	European	16 A 10 A	250 V	No (Note: CEE 7/1 socket accepts earthed CEE 7/3, CEE 7/5 and CEE 7/7 plugs but provides no earth connection.)	No	No	No	Yes (Note: Older sockets can have a very shallow recess.)	Yes
—N/a	BS 4573	British	0.2 A	250 V	No	No	No	Yes	No	No
—N/a	BS 4573	British	Socket only; plug is unspecified (Note: BS 4573 and BS EN 61558-2-5 do not explicitly specify a current rating for a compliant plug, see BS 4573 section of British and compatible standards.)		No	No	No	Yes	No	No
D	BS 546	British	5 A	250 V	Yes	Yes	Optional	Optional	No	No
D	IS 1293	Indian	6 A	250 V	Yes	Yes	Optional	Optional	No	No
D	SANS 164-3	South African	6 A	250 V	Yes	Yes	Optional	Optional	No	No
E	CEE 7/5 socket & CEE 7/6 plug (Note: CEE 7/7 specifies an earthed hybrid plug that fits into both the CEE 7/3 and CEE 7/5 sockets.)	French	16 A	250 V	Yes	Partially (Note: Plug can only be inserted one way with French CEE 7/5, but lack of wiring convention means that the system is not polarized.)	No	No	Yes	Yes
F	CEE 7/3 socket & CEE 7/4 plug	German "Schuko"	16 A	250 V	Yes	No	No	No	Yes	Yes
—N/a	CEE 7/7 plug	French / German hybrid	16 A	250 V	Yes	No (Note: Not polarized when used with a CEE 7/3 socket, most CEE 7/7 plugs are (mechanically only) polarized when used with a CEE 7/5 socket)	No	No	—N/a	—N/a
G	BS 1363, IS 401 & IS 411, MS 589, SS 145	British	13 A (Note: The actual rating of non-rewirable plugs is marked according to the fuse fitted by the cord set manufacturer, the fuse rating being determined by the rating of the flexible cable.)	250 V	Yes (Note: Also accepts unearthed Class II plugs that include an unwired dummy earth pin.)	Yes	Yes	Yes	No	No
H	SI 32	Israeli	16 A	250 V	Yes	Yes (Note: Except when used with unearthed plugs such as the Europlug.)	No	No	No	Yes
I	AS/NZS 3112	Australian and New Zealand	10 A 15 A 20 A	250 V	Yes	Yes	No	Yes	Optional (Note: Sockets may be recessed by 8.3 mm, but few are.)	No
I	GB 1002 & GB 2099.1	Chinese	10 A 16 A	250 V	Yes (Note: There are unearthed Class II plugs with an unwired dummy earth pin, accepted by all sockets. There are also unearthed Class II plugs without an earth pin, accepted only by sockets that do not have an earth-pin-driven shutter.)	Yes	No	Optional	No	No
I	IRAM 2071 (socket), IRAM 2073 & IRAM 2063 (plugs)	Argentine	10 A 20 A	250 V	Yes	Yes	No	Optional	No	No
J	SN 441011 (formerly SN SEV 1011); Type 12 plug and Type 13 receptacle	Swiss	10 A	250 V	Yes	Yes	No	Yes (Note: Import of plugs with non-partially-insulated pins no longer allowed after 2012.)	Yes (Note: Unrecessed type 12 sockets may no longer be installed since 2017.)	Yes
K	107-2-D1	Danish	16 A	250 V	Yes	Yes	No	No (Note: The recess provided by some Danish sockets offers protection against touching the live pins of plugs.)	Optional (Note: Sockets must be recessed or equipped with a switch that allows them to be turned off.)	Yes
L (Note: Type L comes in two variations with ratings of 10 A and 16 A having different pin diameters and spacing from each other.)	CEI 23-50 (formerly CEI 23-16)	Italian	10 A	250 V	Yes	No	No	Yes	No	Yes
L	CEI 23-50 (formerly CEI 23-16)	Italian	16 A	250 V	Yes	No	No	Yes	No	No
M	BS 546	British	15 A	250 V	Yes	Yes	Optional	Optional	No	No
M	IS 1293:2005	Indian	16 A	250 V	Yes	Yes	Optional	Optional	No	No
M	SANS 164-1	South African	16 A	250 V	Yes	Yes	Optional	Optional	No	No
N	NBR 14136 two-pin	Brazilian	20 A 10 A	250 V	No	No	No	Yes	—N/a	—N/a
N	NBR 14136 three-pin	Brazilian	20 A 10 A	250 V	Yes	Yes	No	Yes	Yes	Yes
N	SANS 164-2 two-pin (Note: Also used in Paraguay (PNA-IEC 60906-1).)	South African	16 A	250 V	No	No	No	Yes	—N/a	—N/a
N	SANS 164-2 three-pin	South African	16 A	250 V	Yes	Yes	No	Yes	Yes	Yes
O	TIS 166-2549 two-pin	Thai	16 A	250 V	No	No	No	Yes	—N/a	—N/a
O	TIS 166-2549 three-pin	Thai	16 A	250 V	Yes	Yes	No	Yes	No	Yes
IEC World Plugs Type	Standard	Origin	Rating		Earthed	Polarized	Fused	Insulated pins	Recessed socket	Socket accepts Europlug

== Unusual types ==
=== Lampholder plug ===
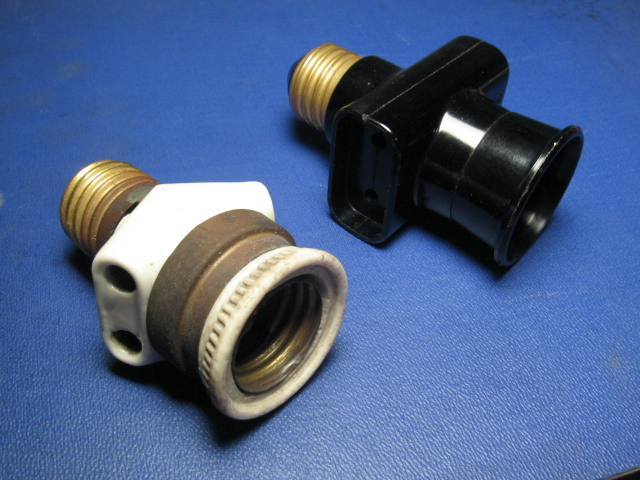
Italian bypass lampholder plugs with Edison screw mount. Left: early type (porcelain and brass, c. 1930). Right: late type (black plastic, c. 1970).

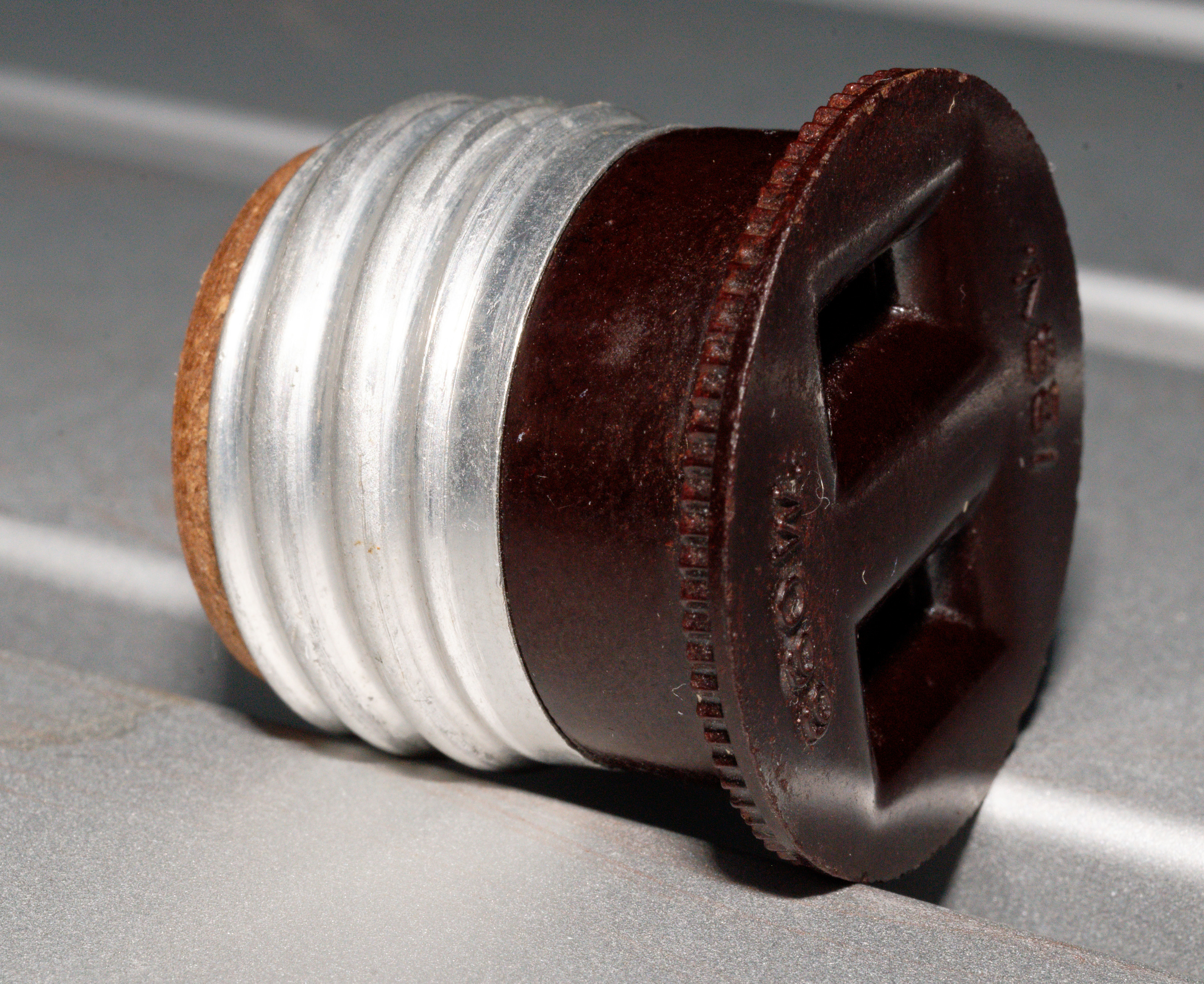
Lampholder plug (US, c. 1950–1960).

A lampholder plug fits into a light socket in place of a light bulb to connect appliances to lighting circuits. Where a lower rate was applied to electric power used for lighting circuits, lampholder plugs enabled the consumers to reduce their electricity costs. Lampholder plugs are rarely fused. Edison screw lampholder adaptors (for NEMA 1-15 plugs) are still commonly used in the Americas.

=== Soviet standard GOST 7396 C 1 unearthed ===
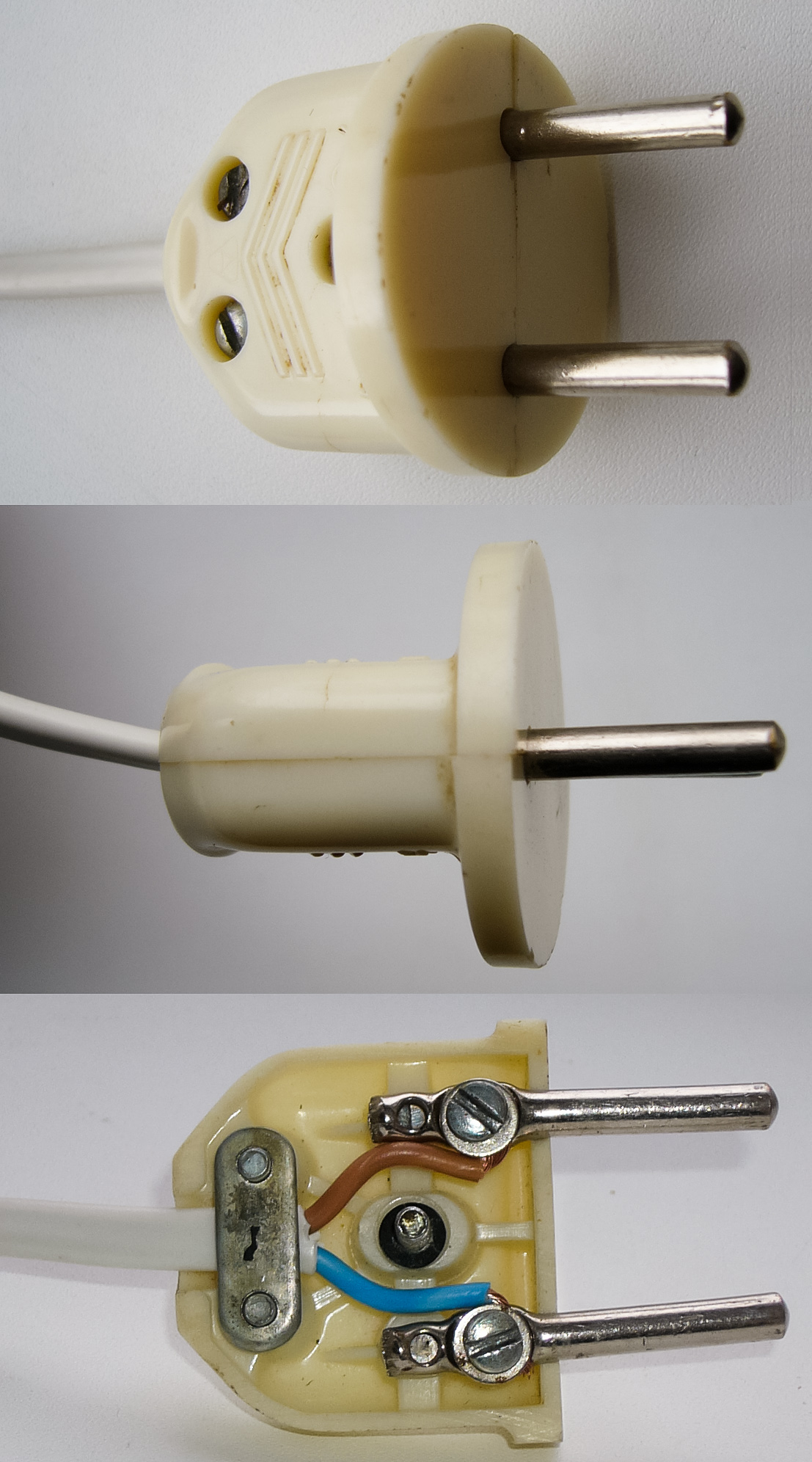
Soviet grip plug, 6 A 250 V AC, thermoset plastic

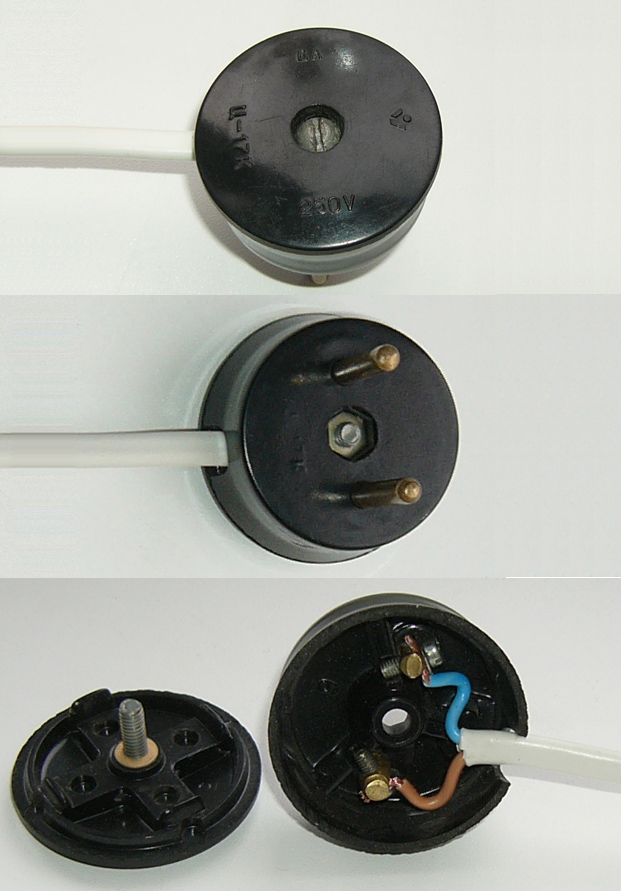
Soviet round plug, 6 A 250 V AC, thermoset plastic, half height

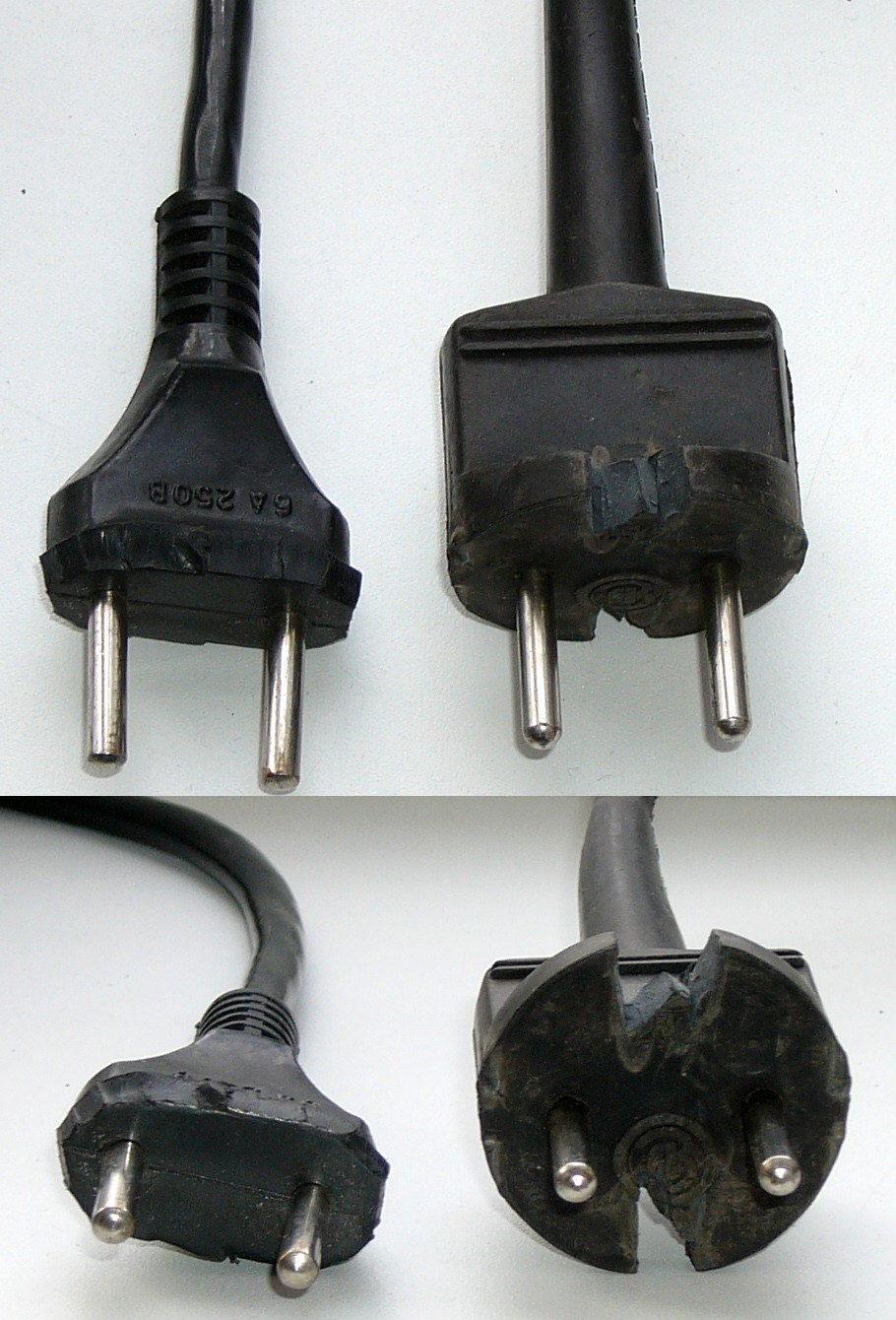
Moulded rubber Soviet plugs cut with knife so that they can fit into CEE 7/3 socket. Originally the plugs had a round base.

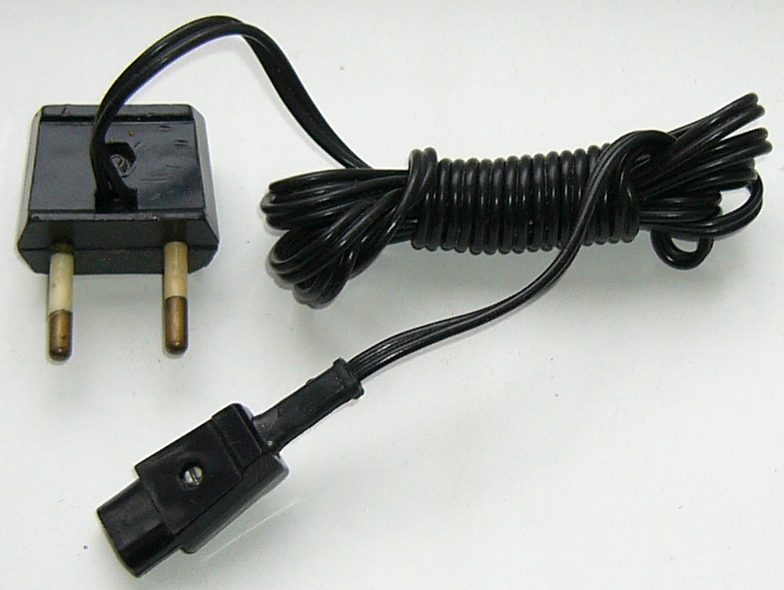
Soviet shaver power cord. The plug is similar to CEE 7/16, but has different configuration. Thermoplastic plug is rated 6 A and 250 V.

This Soviet plug, now rarely used, has pin dimensions and spacing equal to the Europlug, but lacks the insulation sleeves. Unlike the Europlug, it is rated 6 A. It has a round body like the European CEE 7/2 or flat body with a round base like CEE 7/17. The round base has no notches. The pins are parallel and do not converge. The body is made of fire-resistant thermoset plastic. The corresponding 6 A socket accepts the Europlug, but not others as the 4.5 mm holes are too small to accept the 4.8 mm pins of CEE 7/4, CEE 7/6 or CEE 7/7 plugs.

There were also moulded rubber plugs available for devices up to 16 A similar to CEE 7/17, but with a round base without any notches. They could be altered to fit a CEE 7/5 or CEE 7/3 socket by cutting notches with a sharp knife.

=== Soviet adaptor plugs ===
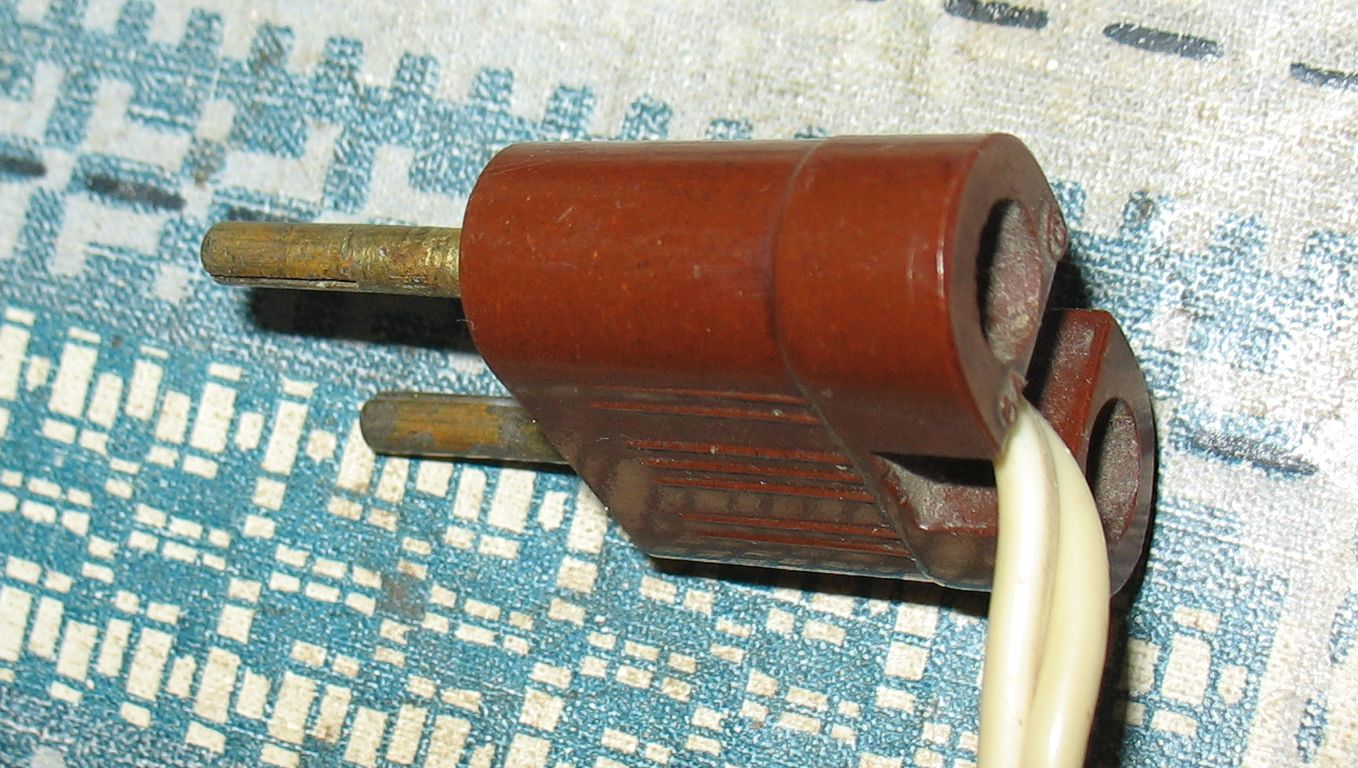
Soviet adaptor plug

Some appliances sold in the Soviet Union had a flat unearthed plug with an additional pass-through socket on the top, allowing a stacked arrangement of plugs. The usual Soviet apartment of the 1960s had very few sockets, so this design was very useful, but somewhat unsafe; the brass cylinders of the secondary socket were uncovered at the ends (to allow them to be unscrewed easily), recessed by only 3 mm, and provided bad contact because they relied on the secondary plug's bisected expanding pins. The pins of the secondary plug (which lacked insulation sleeves) could not be inserted into the cylindrical sockets completely, leaving a 5 mm gap between the primary and secondary plugs. The adaptors were mostly used for low power appliances (for example, connecting both a table lamp and a radio to a socket).

=== UK Walsall Gauge plug ===
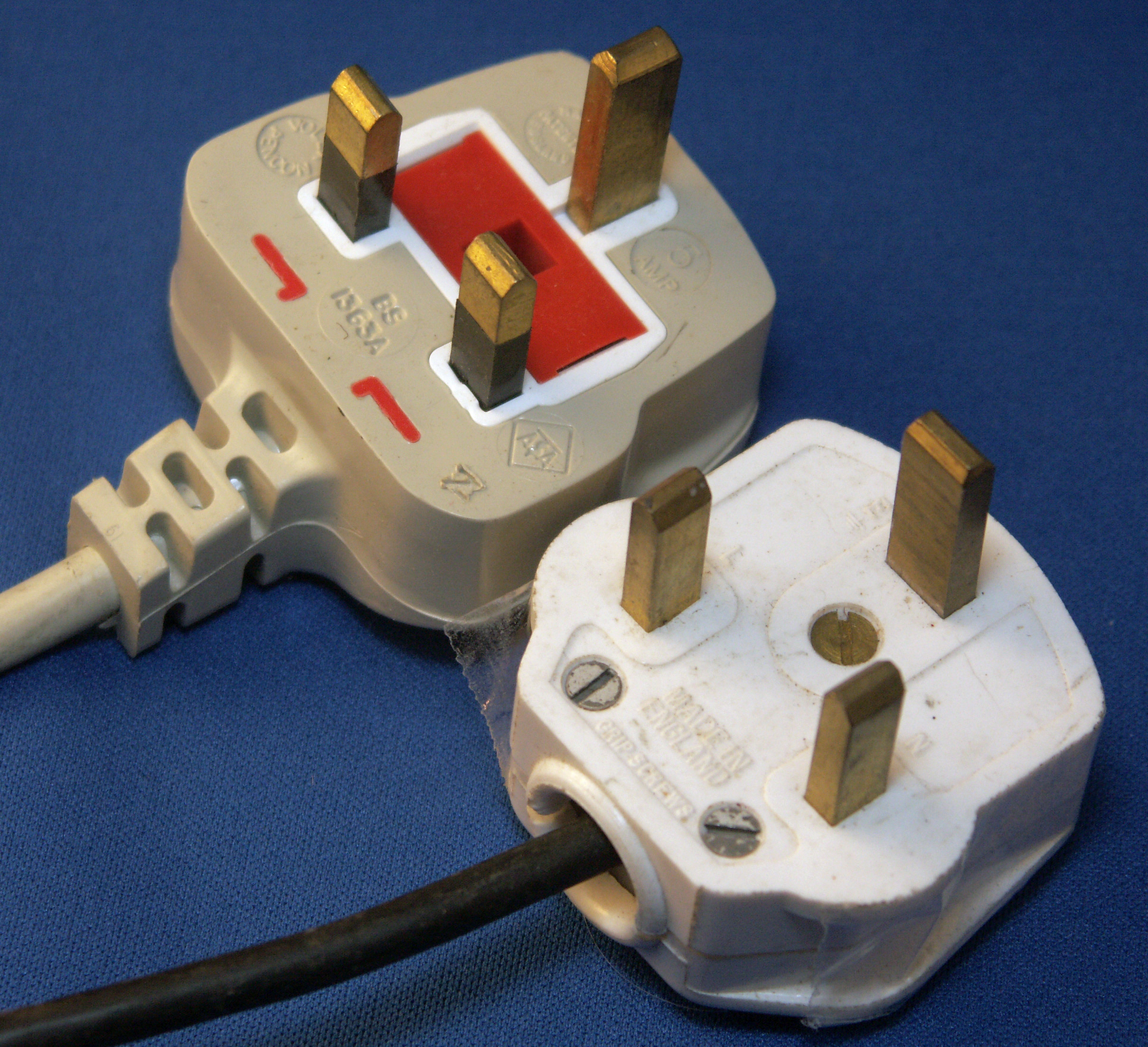
Walsall Gauge 13 A plug (bottom) compared to regular BS 1363 plug

Compared to the standard BS 1363 plugs found in the UK, each pin is rotated 90 degrees. This style of plug/socket was used by university laboratories (from batteries) and the BBC, and is still in use in parts of the London Underground for 110 V AC voltage supply. In the 1960s they were used for 240 V DC in the Power laboratory of the Electrical Engineering department of what was then University College, Cardiff. Power was supplied by the public 240 V DC mains which remained available in addition to the 240 V AC mains until circa 1969, and thereafter from in-house rectifiers. They were also used in the Ministry of Defence Main Building inside circuits powered from the standby generators to stop staff from plugging in unauthorized devices. They were also known to be used in some British Rail offices for the same reason.

=== Italian BTicino brand Magic Security connector ===
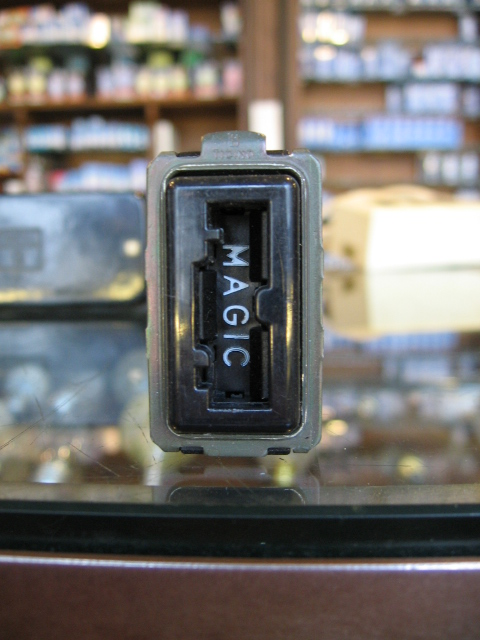
Magic Security socket, detail.

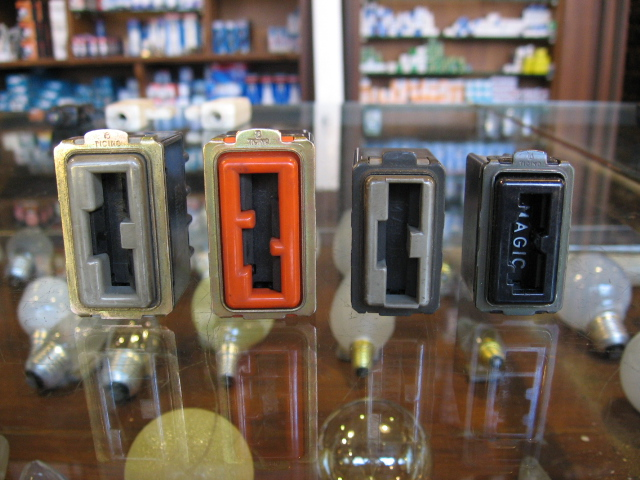
Assortment of Magic Security sockets (in orange, the industrial three-phase type)

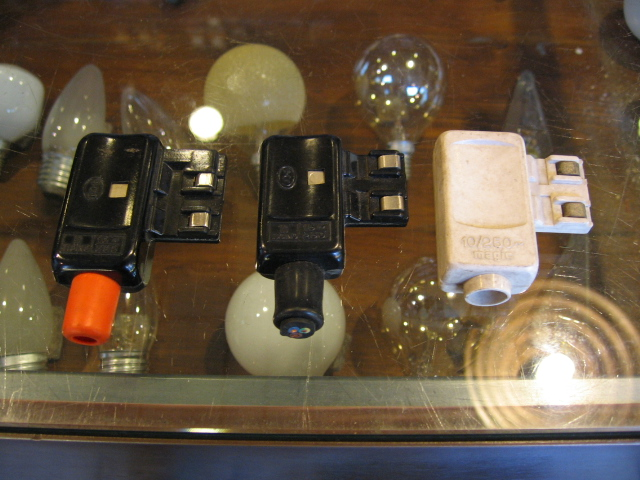
Assortment of Magic Security plugs

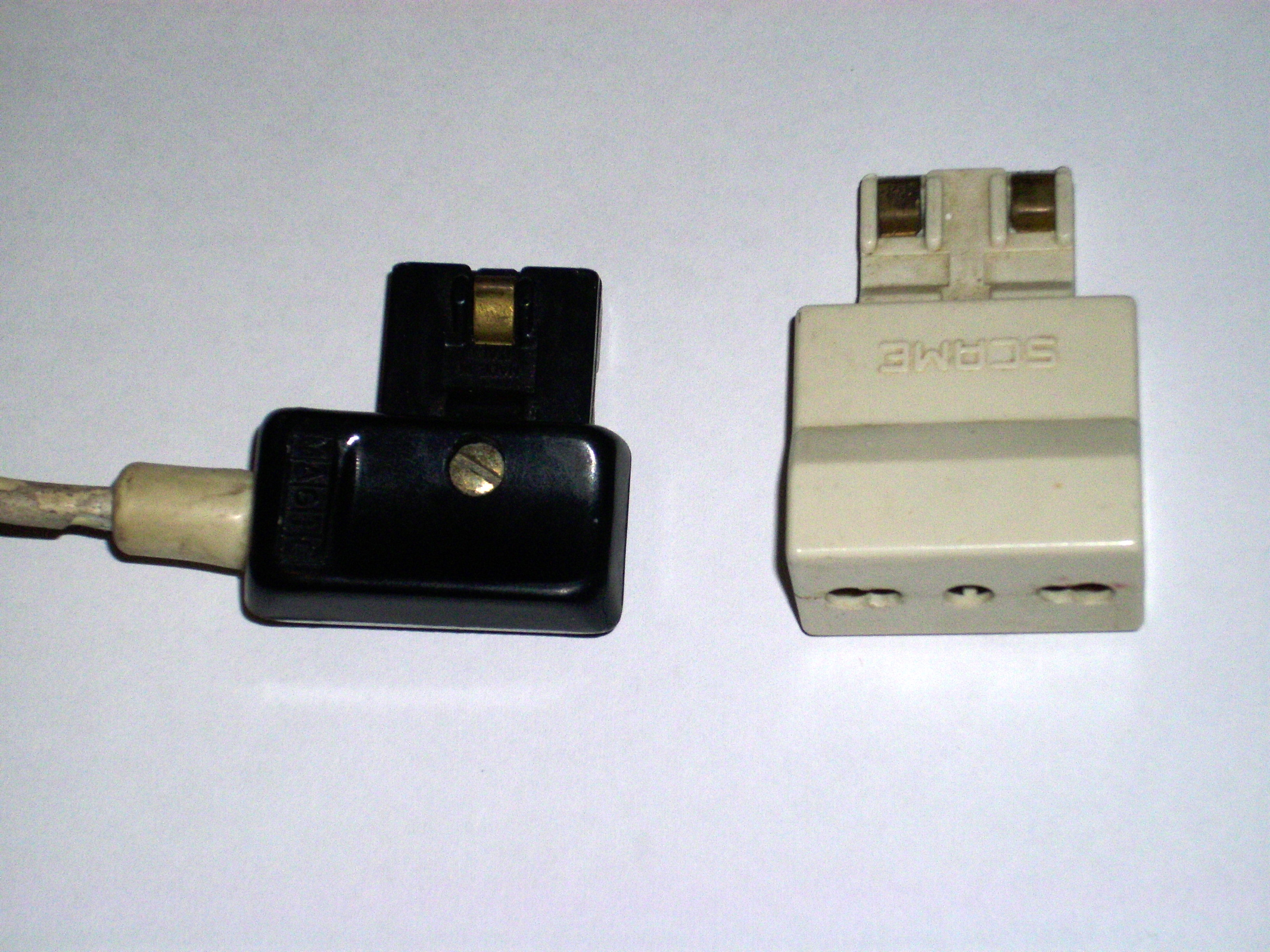
Magic Security plug (10 A) (left) with a Type L to Magic Security plug adaptor

In the 1960s, Italian firm BTicino introduced an alternative to the Europlug or CEI 23-16 connectors then in use, called Magic Security. The socket is rectangular with lateral key pins and indentations to maintain polarization and prevent insertion of a plug with different current ratings. Three single-phase general purpose connectors were rated 10 A, 16 A and 20 A; and a three-phase industrial connector rated 10 A; all of them have different key-pin positioning so plugs and sockets cannot be mismatched. The socket is closed by a safety lid (bearing the word Magic on it) which can be opened only with an even pressure on its surface, thus preventing the insertion of objects (except the plug itself) inside the socket. The contacts are positioned on both sides of the plug; the plug is energised only when it is inserted fully into the socket.

The system is not compatible with Italian CEI plugs, nor with Europlugs. Appliances were never sold fitted with these security plugs, and the use of adaptors would defeat the safety features, so the supplied plugs had to be cut off and replaced with the security connector. Even so, the Magic security system had some success at first because its enhanced safety features appealed to customers; standard connectors of the day were not considered safe enough. The decline of the system occurred when safety lids similar to the Magic type were developed for standard sockets.

In Italy, the system was never definitively abandoned. Though very rarely seen today, it is still marked as available in BTicino's catalogue, (except for the three-phase version, which stopped being produced in July 2011).

In Chile, 10 A Magic connectors are commonly used for computer/laboratory power networks, as well as for communications or data equipment. This allows delicate electronics equipment to be connected to an independent circuit breaker, usually including a surge protector or an uninterruptible power supply backup. The different style of plug makes it more difficult for office workers to connect computer equipment to a standard unprotected power line, or to overload the UPS by connecting other office appliances.

In Iceland, Magic plugs were widely used in homes and businesses alongside Europlug and Schuko installations. Their installation in new homes was still quite common even in the late 1980s.

== See also ==
- Anderson Powerpole
- DC connector
- History of AC power plugs and sockets
- IEC 60309 high-power industrial and polyphase connectors
- IEC 60320 Appliance couplers for household and similar general purposes
- Industrial and multiphase power plugs and sockets
- Mains electricity
- Mains electricity by country lists voltage, frequency, and connector types for more than 200 countries
- Perilex
- Pattress
- Plug load
- Polyphase system
- Smart plug
- Stage pin connector
- Light switch
