= Zip-cord =

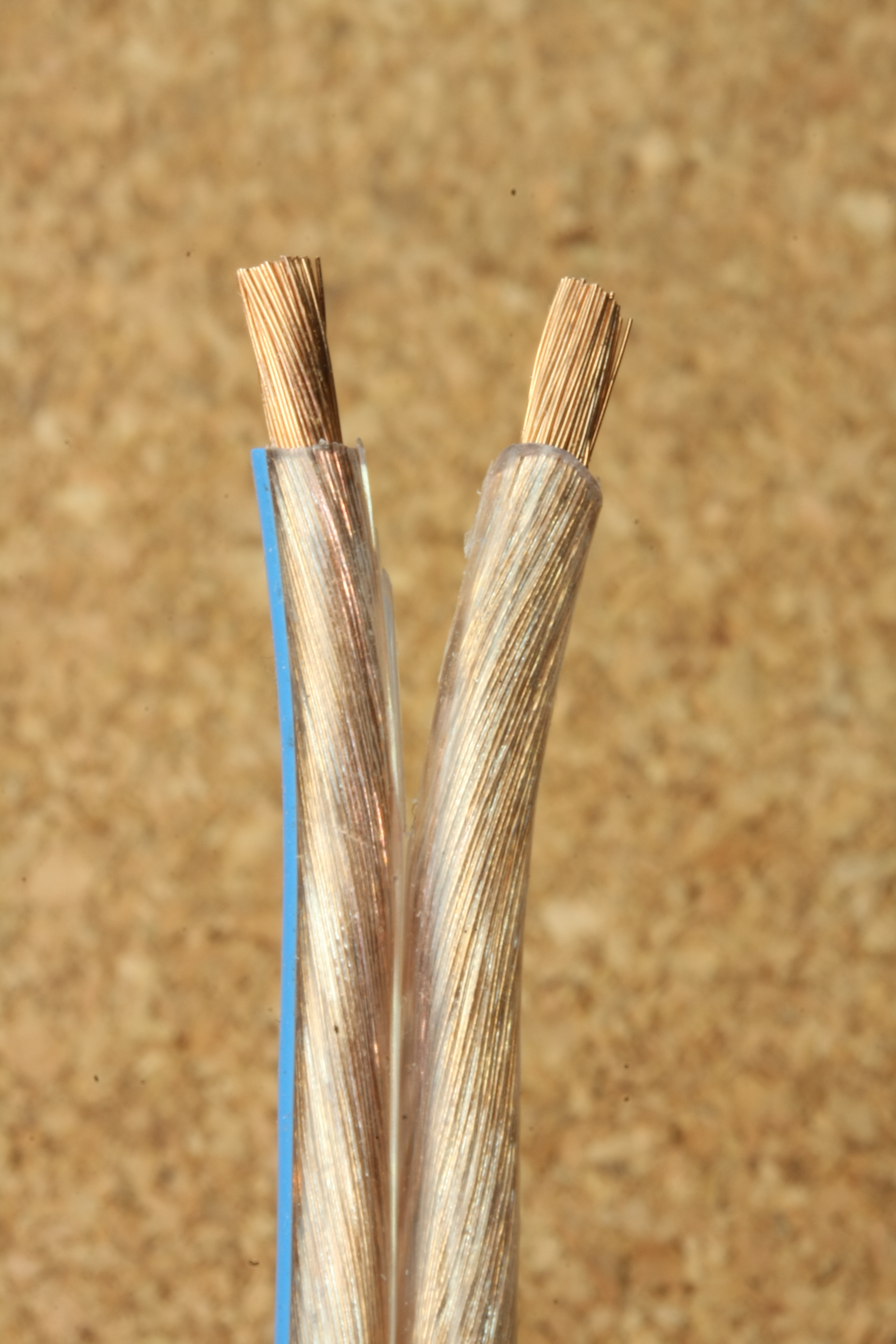
Speaker cable zip cord. The two conductors are held together by the transparent insulation, and can be readily split for connections. This cable uses a blue stripe to identify one conductor.

Zip-cord is a type of electrical cable with two or more conductors held together by an insulating jacket that can be easily separated simply by pulling apart. In Australia it is known as 'figure-8' cable. The zip-cord term is also used with optical fiber cables consisting of two optical fibers joined in a similar manner. The design of zip-cord makes it easy to keep conductors that carry related electrical or optical signals together and helps avoid tangling of cables. Typical uses include lamp cord and speaker wire. Conductors may be identified by a color tracer on the insulation, or by a ridge molded into the insulation of one wire, or by a colored tracer thread inside the insulation. Zip cords are intended for use on portable equipment, and the US and Canadian electrical codes do not permit their use for permanently installed wiring of line-voltage circuits.

== See also ==
- Wire
- Extension cord
