= Appliance plug =

An appliance plug is a three-conductor power connector originally developed for kettles, toasters and similar small appliances. It was common in the United Kingdom, New Zealand, Australia, Germany, the Netherlands and Sweden.

It has largely been made obsolete and replaced by IEC 60320 C15 and C16 connectors, or proprietary connectors to base plates for cordless kettles. It still occurs on some traditional ceramic electric jugs. It is also used for some laboratory water stills.

On some models of the classical ceramic electric jug, the appliance plug prevents the lid from being raised while the connector is inserted. This is important as during operation of these jugs, the water it contains is connected to the electric mains and is an electric shock risk.

Appliance plugs were also used to supply power to electric toasters, electric coffee percolators, electric frypans, and many other appliances. An appliance plug is to some degree heat resistant, but the maximum working temperature varied from manufacturer to manufacturer and even from batch to batch.

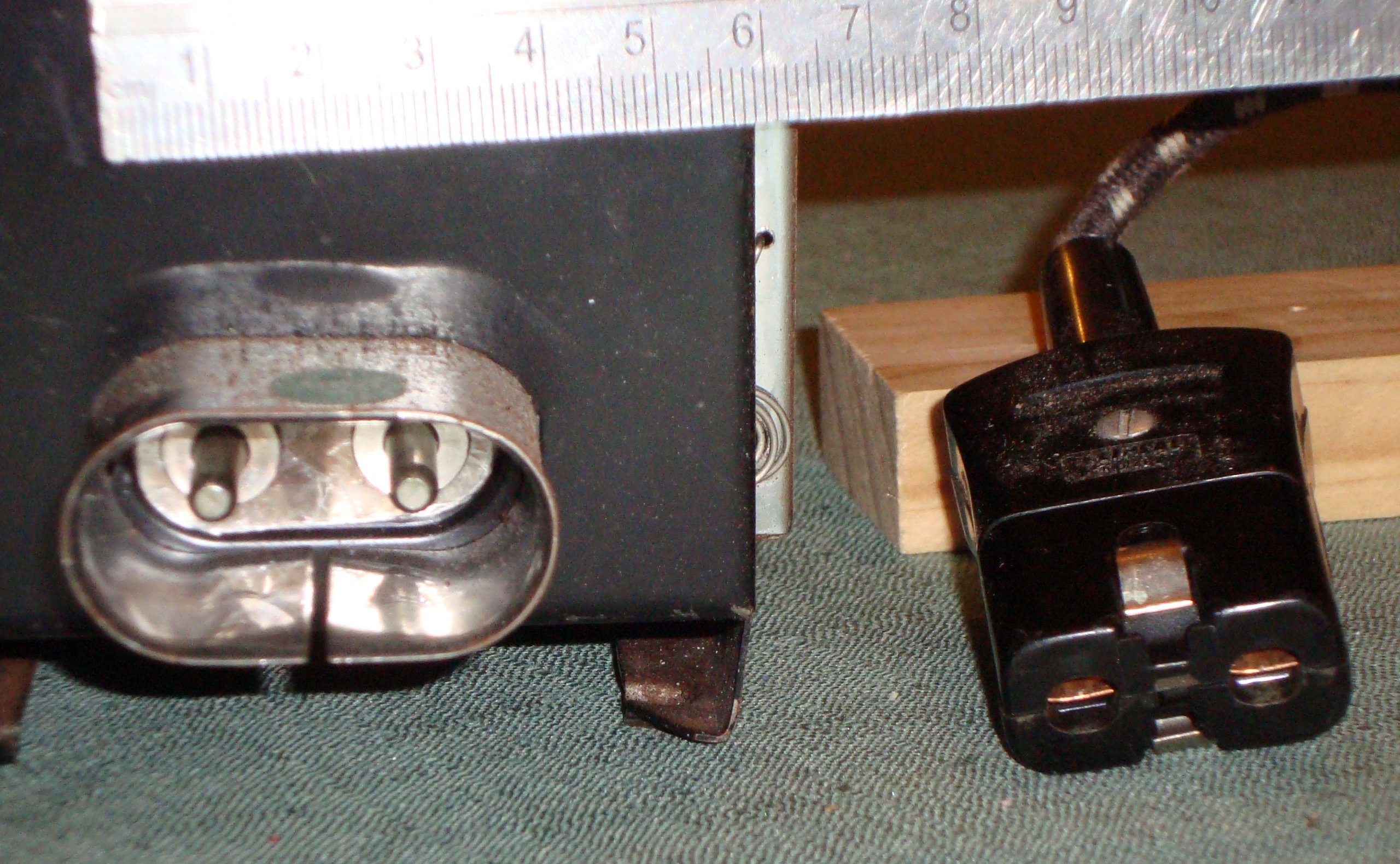
Appliance socket and plug

The mains connectors of the appliance plug are two rounded sockets that accept two rounded pins from the appliance. They are unpolarised. The third connection, earth, is a large metal contact on each side of the plug body which makes contact with the sides of the plug receptacle, grounding the appliance body. Some appliances using these connectors incorporate a spring and plunger mechanism with a temperature-sensitive release system; if the temperature rises significantly above a preset limit - for example, if a kettle boils dry - the spring is released and (if all goes well) the plunger pushes the plug and socket apart. It must then be allowed to cool and then reset manually by forcing the connector back into the appliance.

A plug of same design but probably different dimensions was in use in former USSR for powering electric kettles and electric samovars.
