= Y-cable =

Cable with three ends

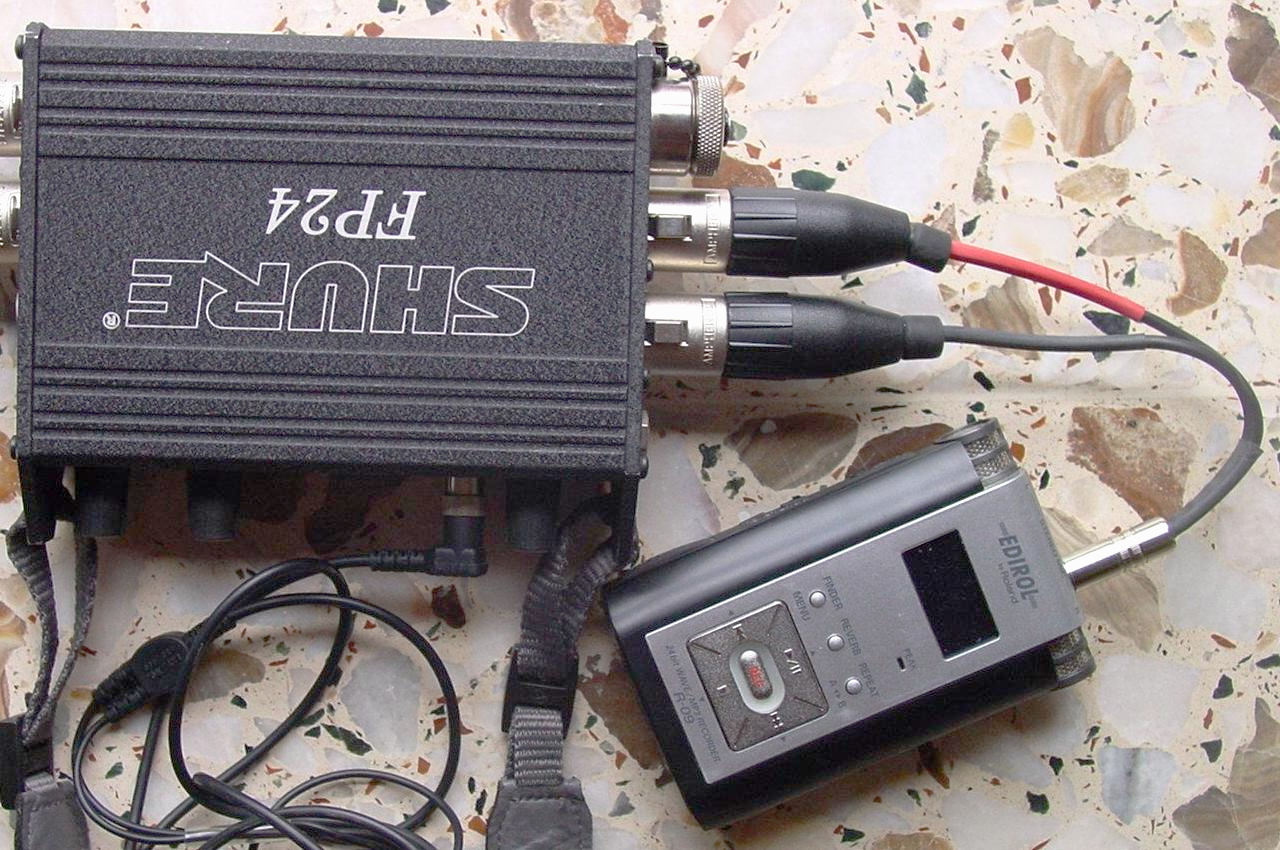
A Shure FP24 preamp's mono XLR line outputs connected to an Edirol R-09 recorder's 3.5mm stereo jack line input, using a Y-cable. This is an example of consolidating connectors, as described below.

A Y-cable, Y cable, or splitter cable is a cable with three ends: one common end and two other ends. The Y-cable can resemble the Latin letter "Y".

== Uses ==
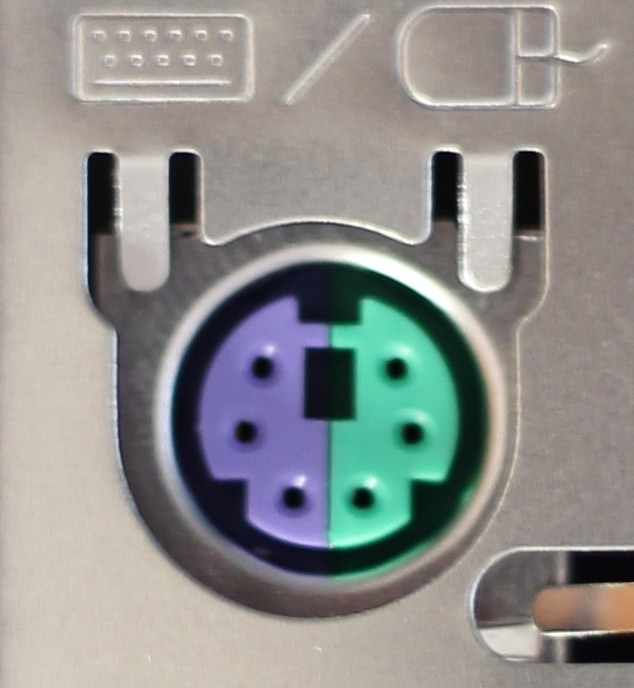
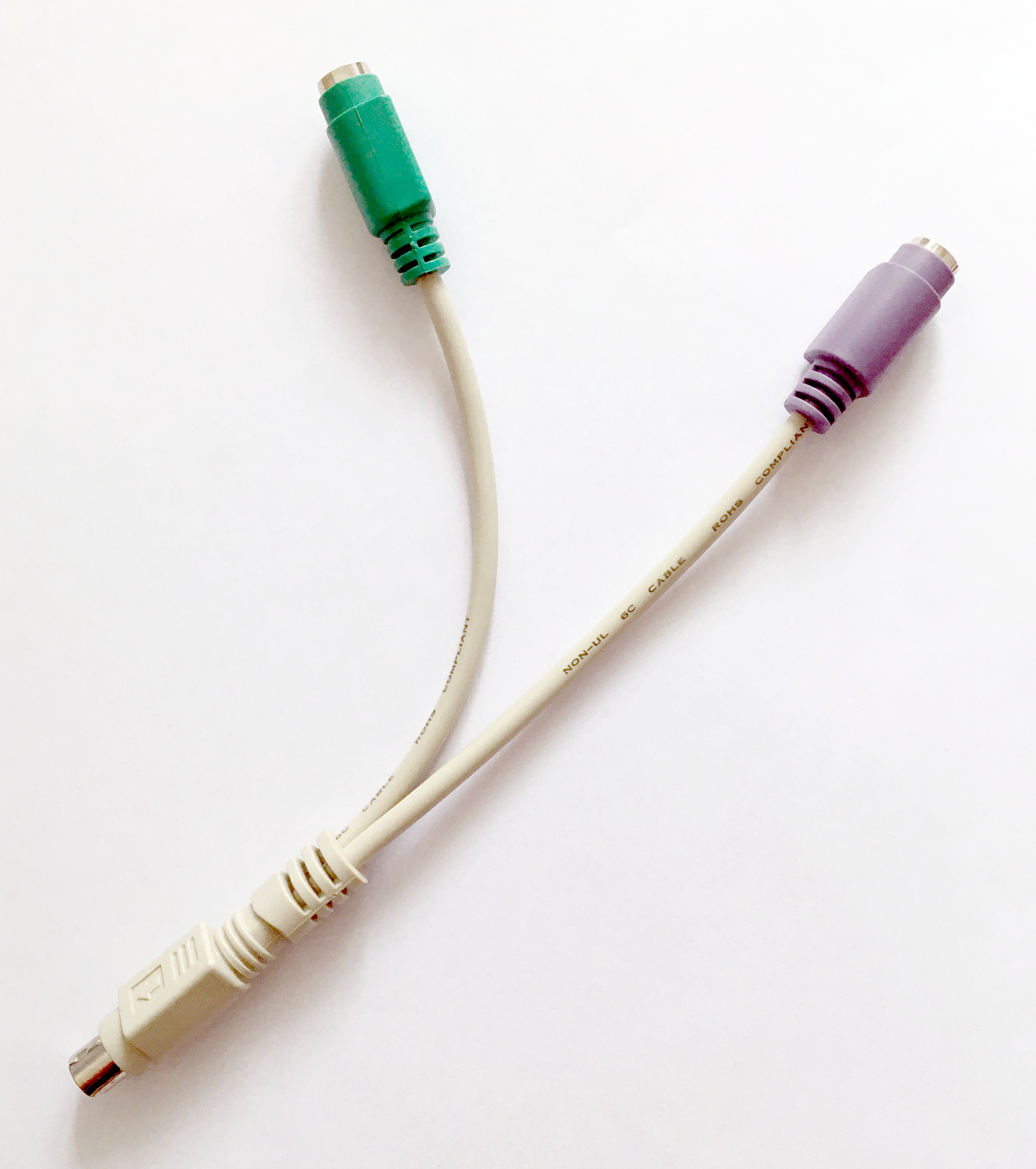
PS/2 dualport, corresponding Y-cable and pinout (female)

=== Analog audio/video signals ===
There are five common uses for Y-cables in signal paths:

1. combining signals (feeding two outputs to one input); (Note: For line-level outputs, this practice is strongly discouraged as the low impedance outputs will attempt to drive each other, which may in the worst case damage the equipment.)
2. splitting signals (feeding one output to two inputs);
3. consolidating connectors (feeding signals from two output connectors to a multi-pole input connector, keeping the signals separate);
4. un-consolidating connectors (feeding signals from one multi-pole output connector to two input connectors, keeping the signals separate);
5. send and return (outbound signal on one leg of the "Y"; inbound signal on the other; signals kept separate).

A Y-cable common in domestic settings has a stereo 3.5mm (1/8″) stereo male minijack at one end, to plug into the line- or headphone-output of an MP3 player, mobile phone, or computer soundcard, and a pair of RCA (phono) male plugs to connect to the left and right mono inputs of an external amplifier. This is an example of un-consolidating connectors, as described above.

=== Power ===
==== Mains ====
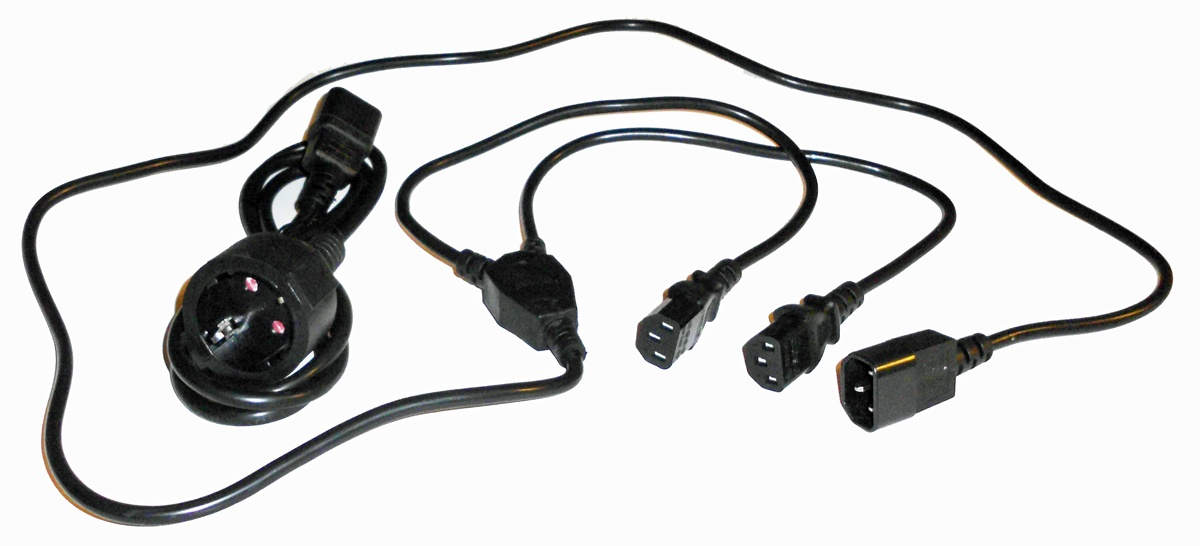
C13/C14 Y-cable

Y-shaped mains leads allow two appliances or devices to receive power from a single mains plug. These cables often feature one male connector branching into two female connectors, enabling both devices to share a single circuit—so long as the total current draw remains within the plug and cable’s rated capacity.

==== Data Centers ====
In data centers, properly rated Y-splitter power cables can be used to reduce the number of power distribution units (PDUs) and minimize cable clutter. By splitting one power source into two or more device connectors (for example, a IEC 60320 C14 inlet to two C13 outlets), operators can optimize rack space and potentially lower upfront equipment costs. However, each Y-splitter must be carefully matched to the circuit’s amperage and voltage ratings to avoid overloading. Professional installations also typically use cables that are certified to meet safety standards (such as UL or IEC) to ensure reliable performance under continuous high loads.

==== Internal disk drives ====
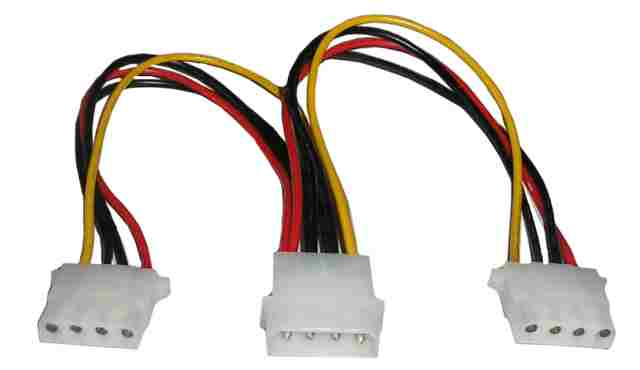
4-pin Molex Y-splitter cable

In older desktop PCs, PATA (aka "IDE") devices such as 5.25 inch optical drives and 3.5 inch hard drives are sometimes powered by means of Molex connector Y-cables.

==== USB ====
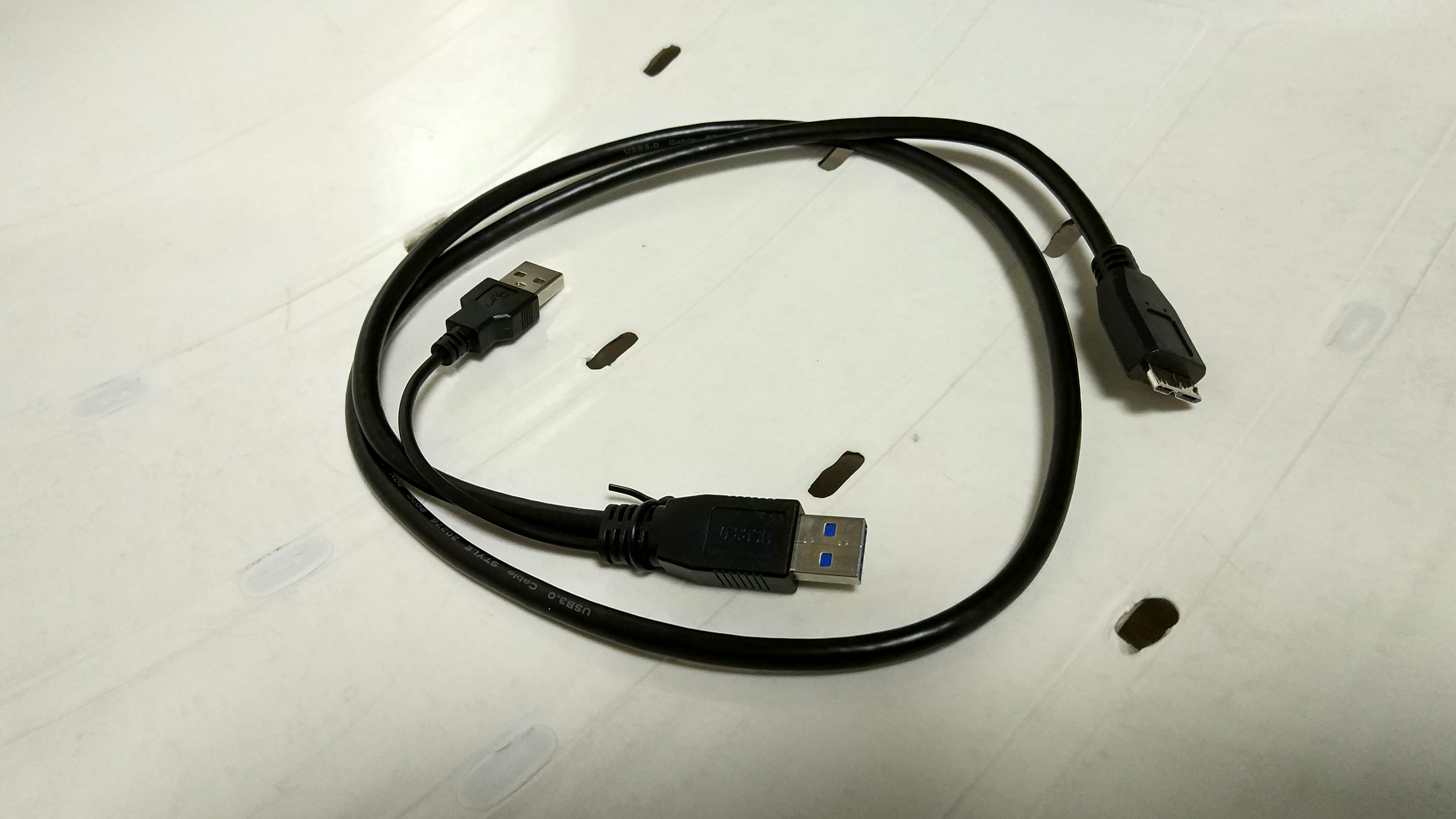
A USB 3.0 Y-cable

Traditional USB Y-cables exist to enable one USB peripheral device to receive power from two USB host sockets at once, while only transceiving data with one of those sockets. As long as the host has two available USB sockets, this enables a peripheral that requires more power than one USB port can supply (but not more than two ports can supply) to be used without requiring a mains adaptor. Portable hard disk drives and optical disc drives are sometimes supplied with such Y-cables, for this reason.

A newer variant on this kind of cable allows a USB peripheral to receive data and power from two different devices respectively. This allows power-hungry peripherals to be used with sockets that are designed to supply little or no outgoing power, such as USB On-The-Go mini-B sockets on smartphones. The power is supplied to the third leg of the "Y" by a mains adaptor or a power bank.
