= Power cord =

Electrical cable that connects an appliance to the electricity supply via a wall socket

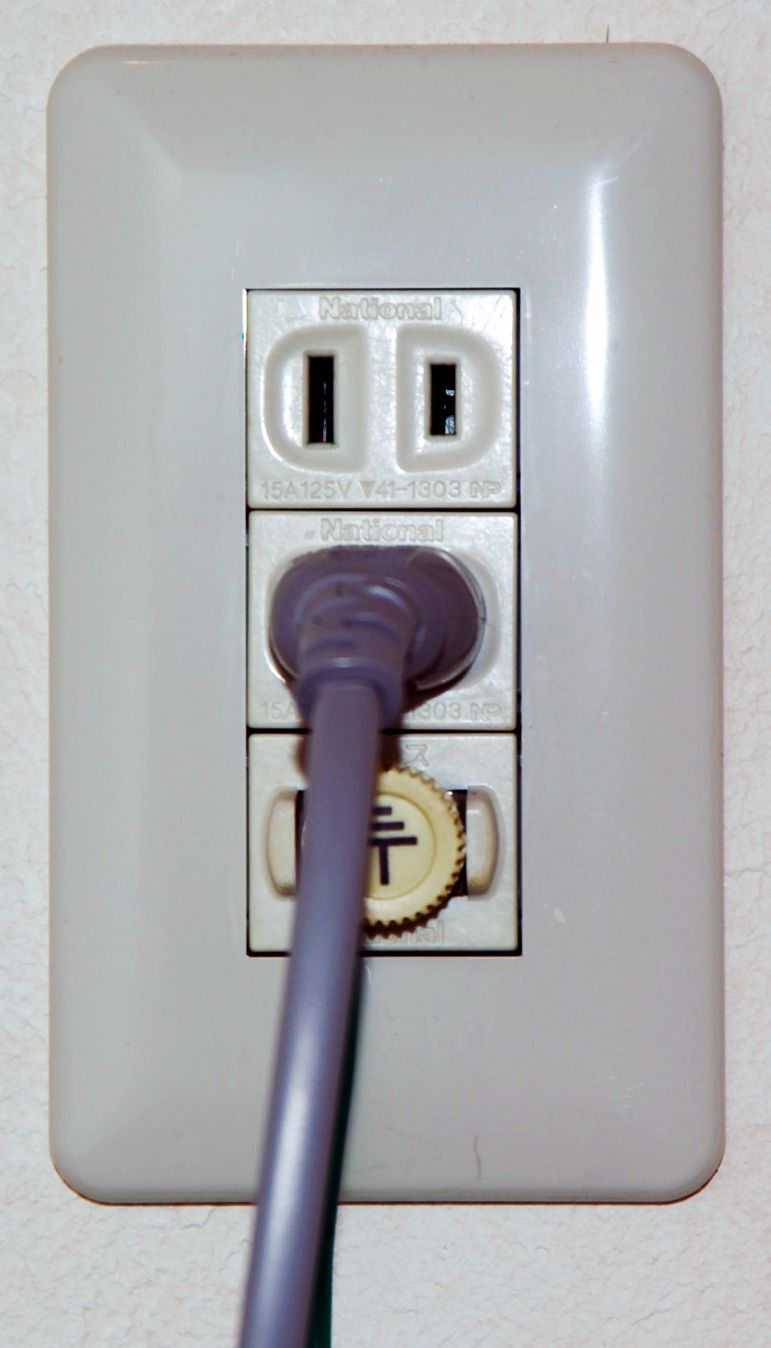
Power cord, with plug at end, plugged into a Japanese outlet with ground post, for a washing machine.

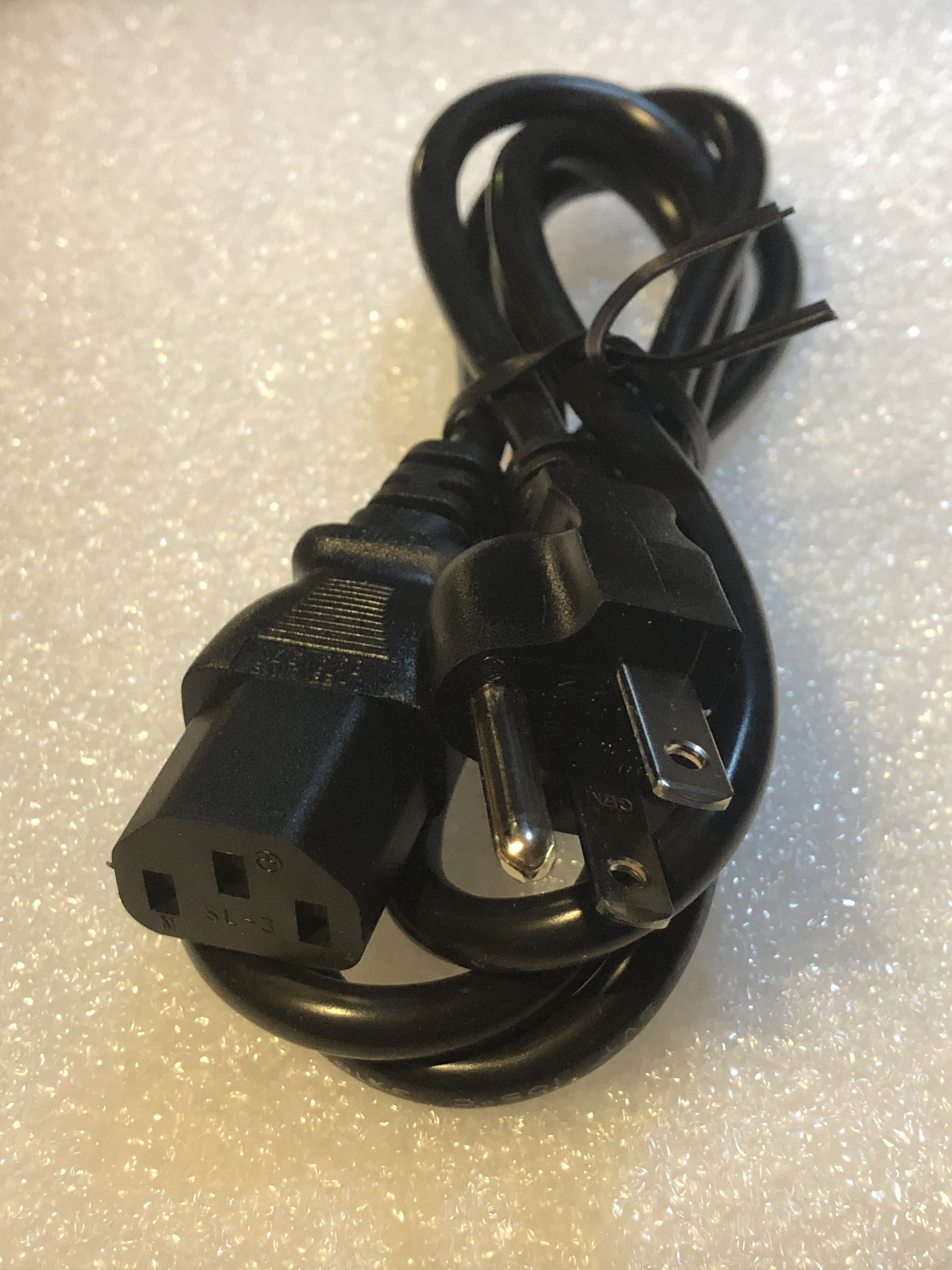
North American power cord with IEC 60320 C13 appliance connector and NEMA 5-15 wall plug.

A power cord, line cord, or mains cable is an electrical cable that temporarily connects an appliance to the mains electricity supply via a wall socket or extension cord. The terms are generally used for cables using a power plug to connect to a single-phase alternating current power source at the local line voltage (generally 100 to 240 volts, depending on the location). The terms power cable, mains lead, flex or kettle lead are also used. A lamp cord (also known as a zip cord) is a light-weight, ungrounded, single-insulated two-wire cord used for small loads such as a table or floor lamp.

A cord set includes connectors molded to the cord at each end (see Appliance coupler). Cord sets are detachable from both the power supply and the electrical equipment, and consist of a flexible cord with electrical connectors at either end, one male, and one female. One end of the cord set is attached to a molded electrical plug; the other is typically a molded electrical receptacle to prevent the possibility of having an exposed live prong or pin which could cause electric shock. The female connector attaches to the piece of equipment or appliance while the male plug connects to the electrical receptacle or outlet.

== Features ==
Power cables may be either fixed or detachable from the appliance. In the case of detachable leads, the appliance end of the power cord has a female connector to link it to the appliance, to avoid the dangers from having a live protruding pin. Cords may also have twist-locking features, or other attachments to prevent accidental disconnection at one or both ends. A cord set may include accessories such as fuses for overcurrent protection, a pilot lamp to indicate voltage is present, or a leakage current detector. Power cords for sensitive instruments, or audio/video equipment may also include a shield over the power conductors to minimize electromagnetic interference.

A power cord or appliance coupler may have a retaining clamp, a mechanical device that prevents it from inadvertently being pulled or shaken loose. Typical application areas with stricter safety requirements include medical technology, stage and lighting technology, and computing equipment. For specialty equipment such as construction machinery, sound and lighting equipment, emergency medical defibrillators and electrical power tools, used in locations without a convenient power source, extension cords are used to carry the electric current up to hundreds of feet away from an outlet.

In North America, the National Electrical Manufacturers Association develops standards for electrical plugs and receptacles and cables.

International power cords and plug adapters are used in conjunction with electrical appliances in countries different from those in which they were designed to operate. Besides a cord with one end compatible to receptacles or a device from one country and the other end compatible with receptacles or devices from another country, a voltage converter is usually necessary, as well, to protect travelers' electronic devices, such as laptops, from the differing voltages between the United States and places like Europe or Africa.

North American lamp cords have two single-insulated conductors designed for low-current applications. The insulator covering one of the conductors is ribbed (parallel to wire) for the entire length of the cord, while the other conductor's insulator is smooth. The smooth one is hot and the ribbed one is neutral.

== Connectors ==
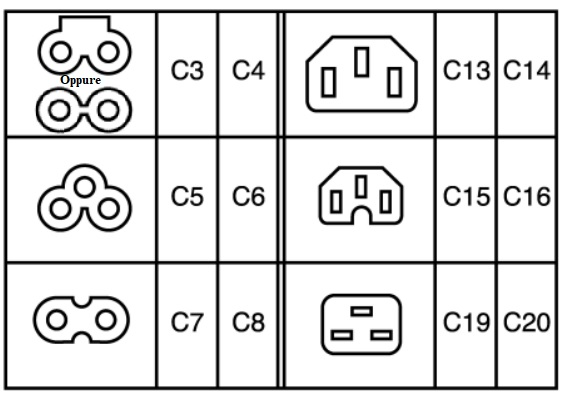
A variety of different kinds of IEC 60320 plugs and sockets

IEC 60320 power cables come in normal and high-temperature variants, as well as various rated currents. The connectors have slightly different shapes to ensure that it is not possible to substitute a cable with a lower temperature or current rating, but that it is possible to use an overrated cable. Cords also have different types of exterior jackets available to accommodate environmental variables such as moisture, temperature, oils, sunlight, flexibility, and heavy wear. For example, a heating appliance may come with a cord designed to withstand accidental contact with heated surfaces.

Worldwide, more than a dozen different types of AC power plugs and sockets are used for fixed building wiring. Products sold in many different markets can use a standardized IEC 60320 connector and then use a detachable power cord to match the local electrical outlets. This simplifies safety approvals, factory testing, and production since the power cord is a low-cost item available as a commodity. Since the same types of appliance-side connectors are used with both 120 V and 230 V power cables, the user must ensure the connected equipment will operate with the available voltage. Some devices have a slide-switch to adapt to different voltages, or wide-ranging power supplies.

== Standards ==
National electrical codes may apply to power cords and related items. For example, in the United States, power cords must meet UL Standards 62 and 817. Power cords are subject to various national and international standards to ensure safety and compatibility. In the United States, the National Electrical Code (NEC) provides guidelines for electrical installations, including the use of flexible cords. Two key Underwriters Laboratories (UL) standards relevant to power cords are:

- UL 62: This standard specifies the requirements for flexible cords and cables, including their construction, performance, and safety characteristics. It covers aspects such as insulation, conductor materials, and temperature ratings, ensuring cords can handle specified voltages and environmental conditions.
- UL 817: This standard pertains to cord sets and power-supply cords, detailing requirements for molded-on or assembled-on fittings, strain relief, and overall cord construction. It ensures that cord sets are safe for consumer use and can withstand mechanical stresses during operation.

== Power supplies ==
Cord sets must be distinguished from AC adapters, where the connector also contains a transformer, and possibly rectifiers, filters and regulators. Unwary substitution of a standard mains-voltage connector for the power supply would result in application of full line voltage to the connected device, resulting in its destruction and possible fire or personal injury.

== See also ==
- AC power plugs and sockets
- Extension cord
- Power strip
- Power supply
