= IEC 60320 =

Set of standards for AC power connectors

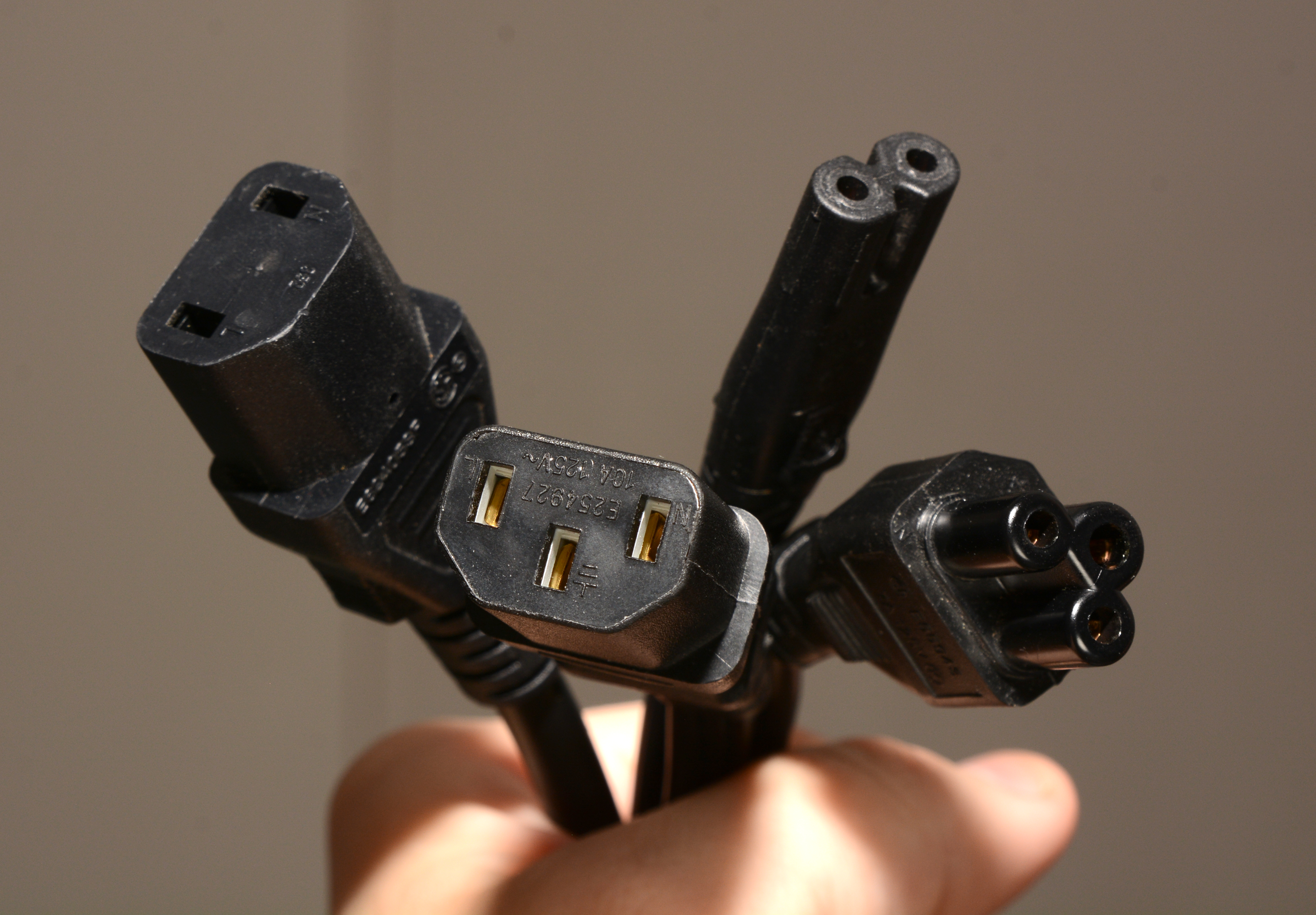
Several types of IEC 60320 plugs (from left to right: C17, C13, C7, and C5)

IEC 60320, entitled "Appliance couplers for household and similar general purposes", is a set of standards published by the International Electrotechnical Commission (IEC) that defines non-locking appliance couplers for connecting power supply cords to electrical appliances. These couplers are intended for use with devices operating at voltages up to 250 volts (AC) and currents up to 16 amperes. The standard specifies various types of connectors, differentiated by shape and size, to accommodate different combinations of current ratings, temperature tolerances, and earthing requirements. Unlike IEC 60309 connectors, IEC 60320 couplers are not keyed or colour-coded to indicate voltage; it is the responsibility of the user to ensure that the appliance's voltage rating is compatible with the local mains supply. The standard uses the term coupler to refer collectively to both the appliance inlets and outlets, as well as the connectors on power supply cords. The first edition of the standard was published in 1970 under the designation IEC 320. It was renumbered to IEC 60320 in 1994 as part of the IEC's revision and reorganization of its numbering system.

== Terminology ==
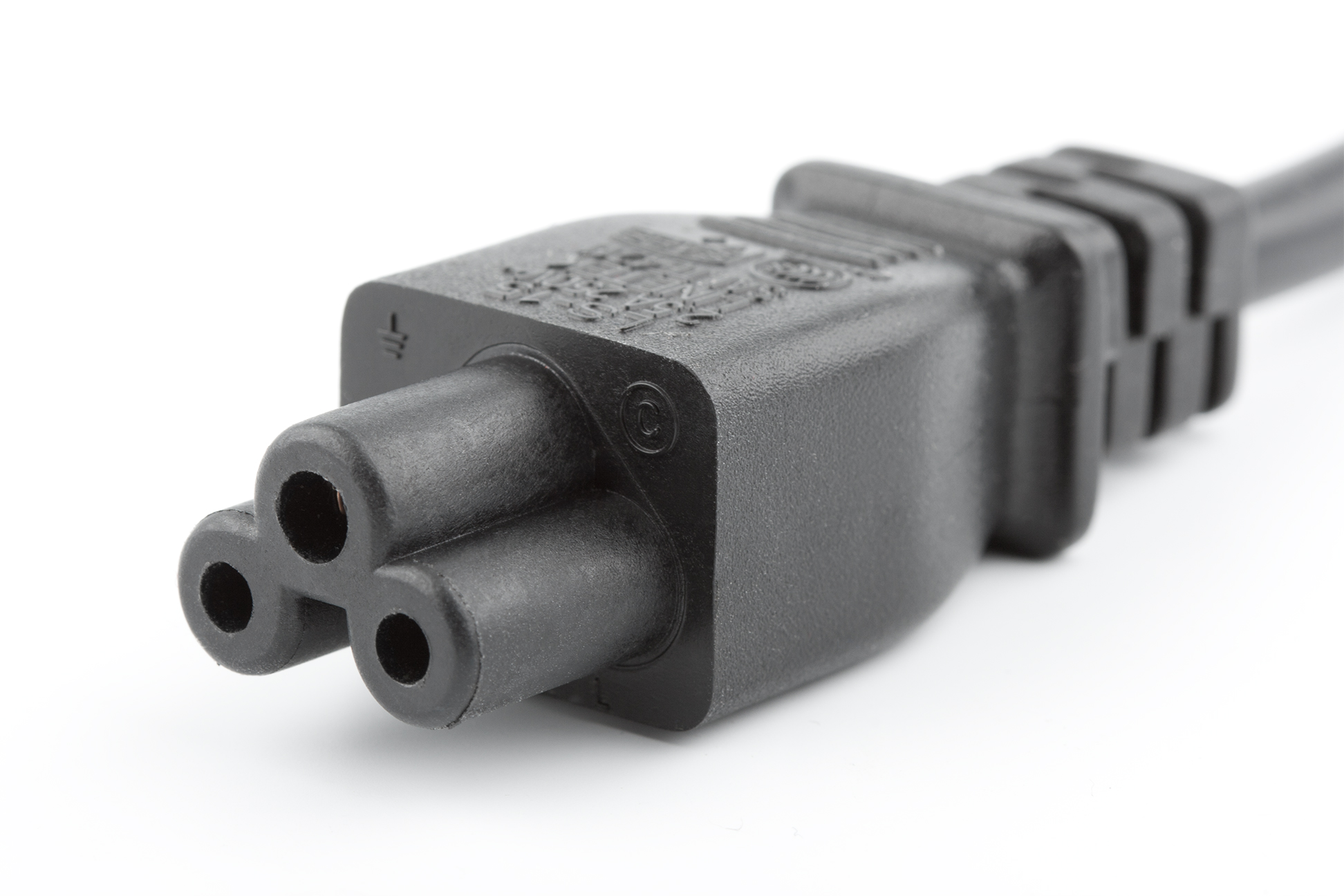
IEC 60320 C5 connector

Appliance couplers enable the use of standard inlets and country-specific cord sets which allow manufacturers to produce the same appliance for many markets, where only the cord set has to be changed for a particular market. Interconnection couplers allow a power supply from a piece of equipment or an appliance to be made available to other equipment or appliances. Couplers described under these standards have standardized current and temperature ratings. The parts of the couplers are defined in the standard as follows.

- Connector: "part of the appliance coupler integral with, or intended to be attached to, one cord connected to the supply".
- Appliance inlet: "part of the appliance coupler integrated as a part of an appliance or incorporated as a separate part in the appliance or equipment or intended to be fixed to it".
- Plug connector: "part of the interconnection coupler integral with or intended to be attached to one cord".
- Appliance outlet: "part of the interconnection coupler which is the part integrated or incorporated in the appliance or equipment or intended to be fixed to it and from which the supply is obtained".
- Cord set: "assembly consisting of one cable or cord fitted with one non-rewirable plug and one non-rewirable connector, intended for the connection of an electrical appliance or equipment to the electrical supply".
- Interconnection cord set: "assembly consisting of one cable or cord fitted with one non-rewirable plug connector and one non-rewirable connector, intended for the interconnection between two electrical appliances".

Non-rewirable plugs and connectors are typically permanently moulded onto cords and cannot be removed or rewired without cutting the cords. The standard uses the terms "male" and "female" only for individual pins and socket contacts, but in general usage they are also applied to the complete plugs and connectors. "Connectors" and "appliance outlets" are fitted with socket contacts, and "appliance inlets" and "plug connectors" are fitted with pin contacts. Each type of coupler is identified by a standard sheet number. For appliance couplers this consists of the letter "C" followed by a number, where the standard sheet for the appliance inlet is 1 higher than the sheet for the corresponding cable connector. Many types of coupler also have common names. The most common ones are "IEC connector" for the common C13 and C14, the "figure-8 connector" for C7 and C8, and "cloverleaf connector" or "Mickey Mouse connector" for the C5/C6. "Kettle plug" (often "jug plug" in Australian or New Zealand English) is a colloquial term used for the high-temperature C16 appliance inlet (and sometimes for C15 connector that the plug goes into). “Kettle/jug plug” is also informally used to refer to regular temperature-rated C13 and C14 connectors. (A high-temperature-rated cord with a C15 connector can be used to power a computer with a C14 plug, but a cord with a low-temperature C13 connector will not fit a high-temperature appliance that has a C16 plug.)

== Application ==
Detachable appliance couplers are used in office equipment, measuring instruments, IT environments, and medical devices, among many types of equipment for worldwide distribution. Each appliance's power system must be adapted to the different plugs used in different regions. An appliance with a permanently-attached plug for use in one country cannot be readily sold in another which uses an incompatible wall socket; this requires keeping track of variations throughout the product's life cycle from assembly and testing to shipping and repairs.

Instead, a country-specific power supply cord can be included in the product packaging, so that model variations are minimized and factory testing is simplified. A cord which is fitted with non-rewireable (usually moulded) connectors at both ends is termed a cord set. Appliance manufacturing may be simplified by mounting an appliance coupler directly on the printed circuit board. Assembly and handling of an appliance is easier if the power cord can be removed without much effort.

Appliances can be used in another country easily, with a simple change of the power supply cord (including a connector and a country-specific plug). The power supply cord can be replaced easily if damaged, because it is a standardized part that can be unplugged and re-inserted. Safety hazards, maintenance expenditure and repairs are minimized.

== Standards ==
=== Parts of the standard ===
IEC 60320 is divided into several parts:

- IEC 60320-1: General Requirements specifies two-pole and two-pole with earth couplers intended for the connection of a mains supply cord to electrical appliances. Beginning with the IEC 60320-1:2015 edition, this part also specifies interconnection couplers which enable the connection and disconnection of an appliance to a cord leading to another appliance, incorporating IEC 60320-2-2. At the same time, this part of the standard no longer includes standard sheets which were moved to a new part: IEC 60320-3.
- IEC 60320-2-1: Sewing machine couplers specifies couplers which are not interchangeable with other couplers from IEC 60320, for use with household sewing machines. They are rated no higher than 2.5 A and 250 V AC.
- IEC 60320-2-2: Interconnection couplers for household and similar equipment. This section was withdrawn in January 2016. The general requirements for these items were incorporated into IEC 60320-1 and the standard sheets were moved to IEC 60320-3.
- IEC 60320-2-3: Couplers with a degree of protection higher than IPX0 specifies couplers with some degree of liquid ingress protection (IP). In its second edition published in 2018, the standard sheets were moved to IEC 60320-3.
- IEC 60320-2-4: Couplers dependent on appliance weight for engagement.
- IEC 60320-3: Standard sheets and gauges. First published October 31, 2014, this part initially included the standard sheets for both appliance couplers and interconnection couplers. In a 2018 amendment, the standard sheets for the IP couplers defined by 60320-2-3 were added. For appliance couplers the various coupler outlines are designated using a combination of letters and numbers, e.g., "C14". The connector supplies power to the appliance inlet. The appliance inlet is designated by the even number one greater than the number assigned to the connector, so a C1 connector mates with a C2 inlet, and a C15A mates with a C16A. Interconnection couplers have single letter designators, e.g., "F". They consist of a plug connector and an appliance outlet. The plug connector is the part integral with, or intended to be attached to, the cord, and the appliance outlet is the part integrated with or incorporated into the appliance or equipment or intended to be fixed to it, and from which the supply is obtained.

=== Contents of standards ===
The standards define the mechanical, electrical and thermal requirements and safety goals of power couplers. The standard scope is limited to appliance couplers with a rated voltage not exceeding 250 V (a.c.) at 50 Hz or 60 Hz, and a rated current not exceeding 16 A. Further sub-parts of IEC 60320 focus on special topics such as protection ratings and appliance specific requirements.

Selection of a coupler depends in part on the IEC appliance classes. The shape and dimensions of appliance inlets and connectors are coordinated so that a connector with lower current rating, temperature rating, or polarization cannot be inserted into an appliance inlet that requires higher ratings. (i.e. a Protection Class II connector cannot mate with a Class I inlet which requires an earth); whereas connecting a Class I connector to a Class II appliance inlet is possible because it creates no safety hazard.

Pin temperature is measured where the pin projects from the engagement surface. The maximum permitted pin temperatures, are 70 °C (158 °F), 120 °C (248 °F), and 155 °C (311 °F), respectively (the higher temperatures are not applicable to interconnection couplers). The pin temperature is determined by the design of the appliance, and its interior temperature, rather than by its ambient temperature. Typical applications with increased pin temperatures include appliances with heating coils such as ovens or electric grills. It is generally possible to use a connector with a higher rated temperature with a lower rated appliance inlet, but the keying feature of the inlet prevents use of a connector with a lower temperature rating.

Connectors are also classified according to the method of connecting the cord, either as rewirable connectors or non-rewirable connectors.

In addition the standards define further general criteria such as withdrawal forces, testing procedures, the minimum number of insertion cycles, and the number of flexings of cords.

IEC 60320-1 defines a cord set as an "assembly consisting of one cable or cord fitted with one plug and one connector, intended for the connection of an electrical appliance or equipment to the electrical supply". It also defines an interconnection cord set as an "assembly consisting of one cable or cord fitted with one plug connector and one connector, intended for the interconnection between two electrical appliances".

In addition to the connections within the standards, as mentioned, there are possible combinations between appliance couplers and IEC interconnection couplers. Fitted with a flexible cord, the components become interconnection cords to be used for connecting appliances or for extending other interconnection cords or power supply cords.

== North American ratings ==
North American rating agencies (CSA, NOM-ANCE, and UL) will certify IEC 60320 connectors for higher currents than are specified in the IEC standard itself. In May 2011, the modified criteria were codified as UL 60320-1 and CSA C22.2 no. 60320-1, respectively, with compliance required from May 2021.

In particular, UL will certify:

- C5/C6 connectors for up to 13 A, although 10 A is more commonly seen (IEC maximum is 2.5 A)
- C7/C8 connectors for up to 10 A (IEC maximum is 2.5 A)
- C13/C14 and C15/C16 connectors for up to 15 A (IEC maximum is 10 A)
- C19/C20 and C21/C22 connectors for up to 20 A (IEC maximum is 16 A)

Given the 120 V (±5%) mains supply used in the United States and Canada, these higher ratings permit devices with C6 and C8 inlets to draw more than 114 V × 2.5 A = 285 W from the mains, and devices with C14 inlets to draw more than 1140 W from the mains.

This is exploited by high-powered computer power supplies, up to 1200 W output, and even some particularly efficient 1500 W output models to use the more popular C14 inlet on products sold worldwide.

Although less common, power bricks with C6 and C8 inlets and ratings up to 300 W also exist.

== Appliance couplers ==
The dimensions and tolerances for connectors, appliance inlets, appliance outlets and plug connectors are given in standard sheets, which are dimensioned drawings showing the features required for safety and interchangeability.

Couplers
Connector (Female)	Appliance inlet (Male)	Plug connector (Male)	Appliance outlet (Female)	Diagram	Earth contact	Polarized	Rewirable connector allowed?	Max. current (A)	Appliance class	Pin spacing, centres (mm)	Max. pin temp. (°C)	Remarks and example uses
C1	C2	-	-		No	No	No	0.2	II	6.6	70	Found on many electric shavers, for example.
C3	C4	-	-		No	Yes		2.5	II	10	70	Similar connector to C5/C6, but with a key ridge instead of an earthing conductor, withdrawn from standard.
C5	C6	A	B		Yes	Yes	No	2.5	I	10 (H); 4.5 (V)	70	Many small switched-mode power supplies used for laptops. Commonly referred to as a "clover-leaf" or "Mickey Mouse" connector due to its shape.
C7	C8	C	D		No	No	No	2.5	II	8.6	70	Domestic audio, video, radio equipment and doubly insulated power supplies. C8 inlet is 10 mm deep, C8A and C8B inlets are 15.5 mm deep. Commonly referred to as "figure 8" or "infinity" in the UK.: There is a similar polarized connector having one squared side, but this is not part of the standard.
C9	C10	-	-		No	No	No	6	II	10	70	This kind of coupler is used by Roland Corporation for a number of synthesizer, drum machine and effects units (for example: TR-909, D-50, JD-800, Boss DE-200) and by Revox for many older models of their hi-fi equipment (for example, A76, A77, A78, B77, B225). Was also used heavily on Marantz hi-fi equipment in the 1980s and 1990s.
C11	C12	-	-		No	Yes		10	II	10	70	Similar to C9 with a slot in the connector, withdrawn from standard.
C13	C14	E	F		Yes	Yes	Yes	10	I	14 (H); 4 (V)	70	Very common on personal computers and peripherals. Commonly referred to as a "kettle cord" or "kettle lead", but C13/14 connectors are only rated for 70 °C (158 °F): a device such as a kettle requires the C15/16 connector, rated for 120 °C (248 °F).
C15	C16	M	N		Yes	Yes	Yes	10	I	14 (H); 4 (V)	120	For use in high-temperature settings (for example, electric kettle). Also sometimes used for enterprise IT equipment if the possibility exists that the temperature at the socket reaches more than 70 degrees.
C15A	C16A	O	P		Yes	Yes	Yes	10	I	14 (H); 4 (V)	155	For use in very-high-temperature settings, such as some stage lighting instruments. Similar to C15/C16, but the top is narrowed to exclude the C15 cord connector.
C17	C18	G	H		No	Yes	No	10	II	14	70	Xbox One and some Xbox 360 power supplies, some PS4 Pro models, some vacuum cleaners, CPAP machines, audio equipment, televisions, medical devices, IBM Wheelwriter typewriters.
C19	C20	I	J		Yes	Yes	Yes	16	I	13 (H); 8 (V)	70	Common for supply of power to enterprise-class servers, UPSes, datacenter rack-mounted power-distribution units and other equipment that draws too much current for C13/C14 type to be used.
C21	C22	Q	R		Yes	Yes	Yes	16	I	13 (H); 8 (V)	155	High-temperature variant of C19/C20
C23	C24	K	L		No	Yes	No	16	II	13	70	Ungrounded variant of C19/C20

=== Mains appliance couplers ===
The mains appliance couplers are all engineered to connect an appliance via a power cord to mains power.

==== C1/C2 coupler ====
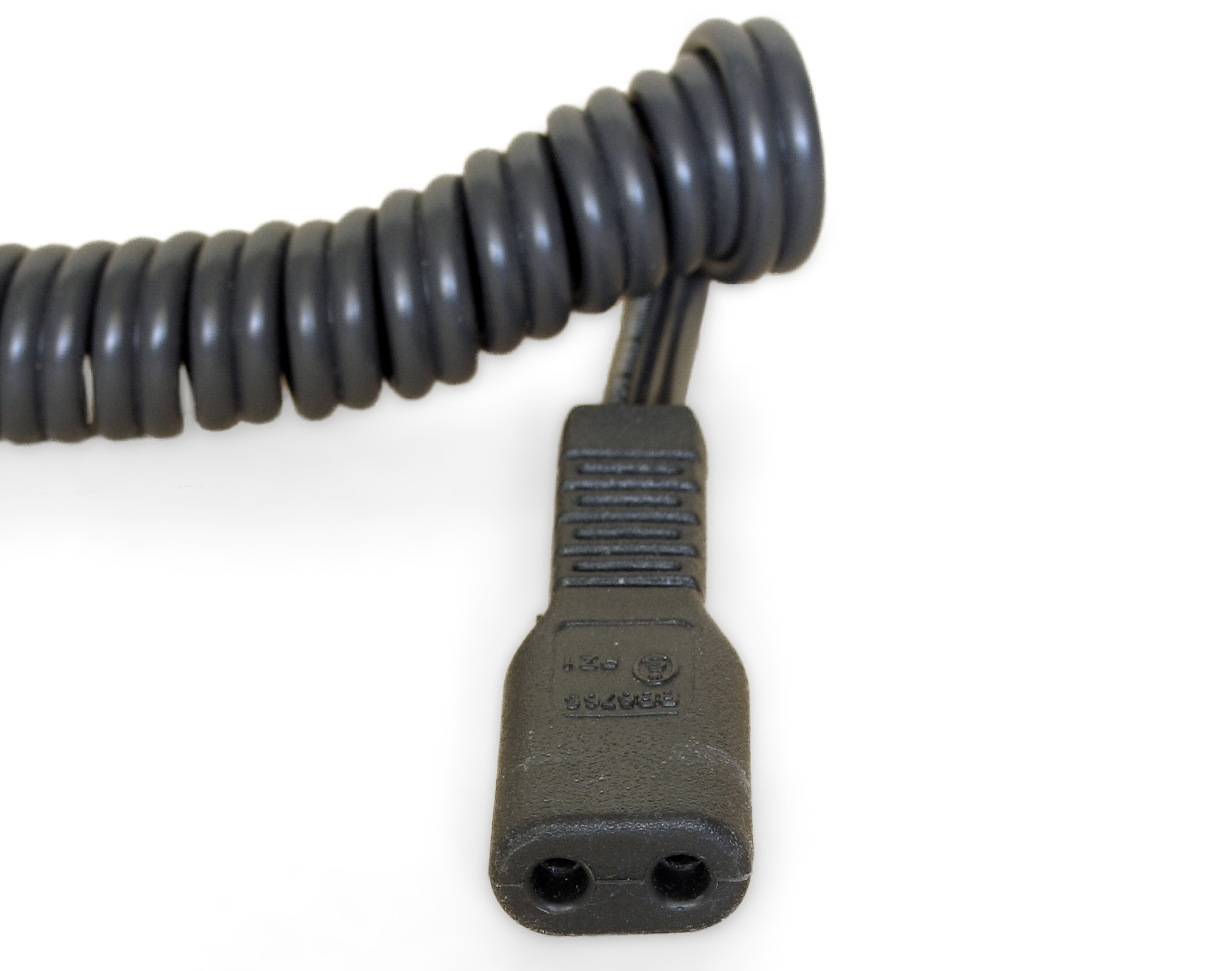
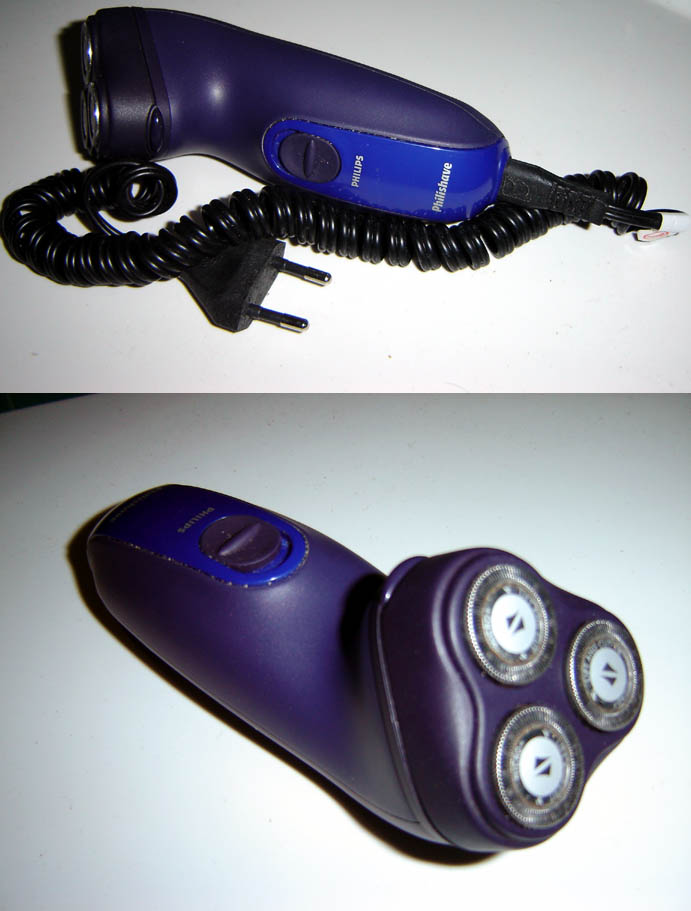

The C1 coupler and C2 inlet were commonly used for mains-powered electric shavers. These have largely been supplanted by cordless shavers with rechargeable batteries or corded shavers with an AC adapter.

==== C5/C6 coupler ====
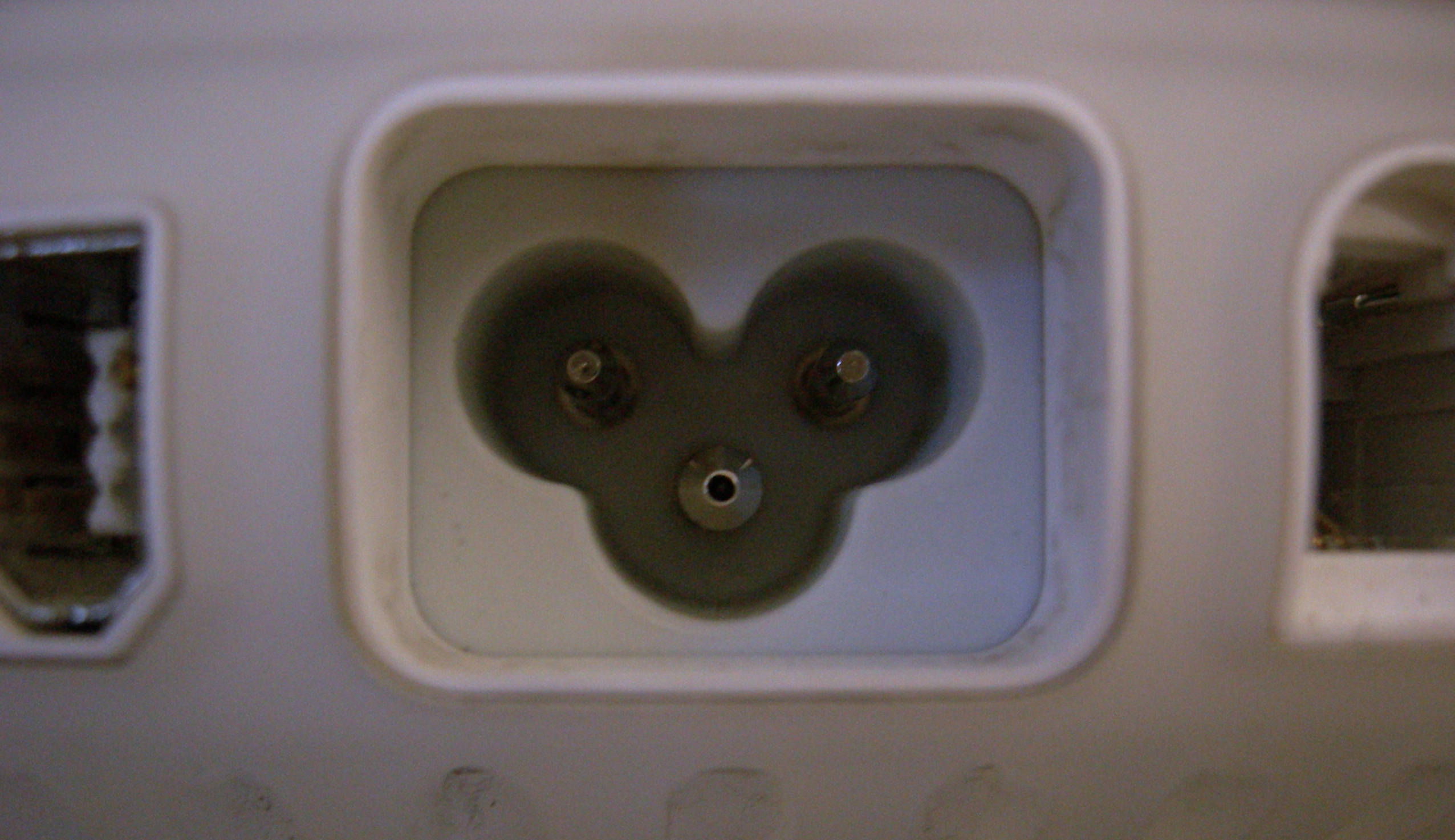
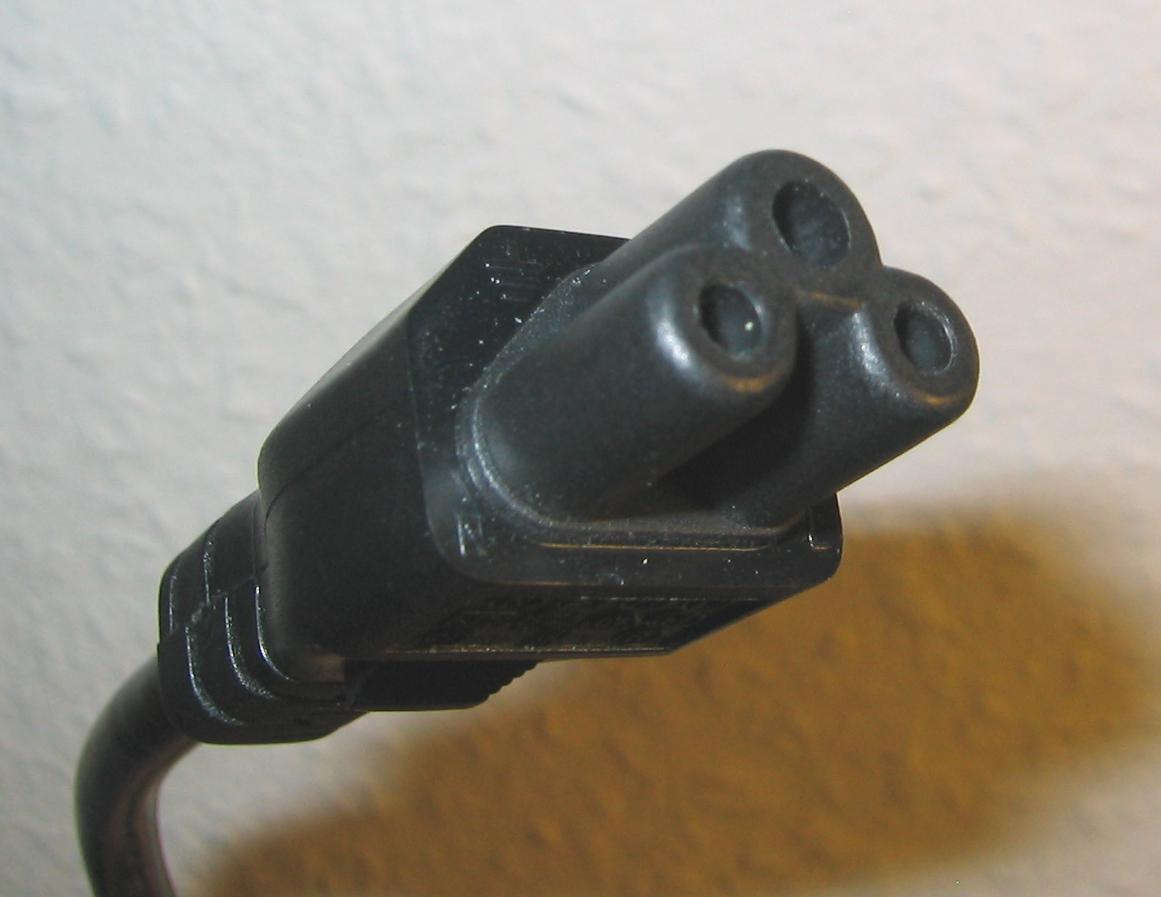

This coupler is sometimes colloquially called a "cloverleaf" or "Mickey Mouse" coupler (because the cross section resembles the silhouette of the Disney character).

The C6 inlet is used on laptop power supplies as well as on some desktop computers, some LCD monitors, and some desktop label printers.

==== C7/C8 coupler ====
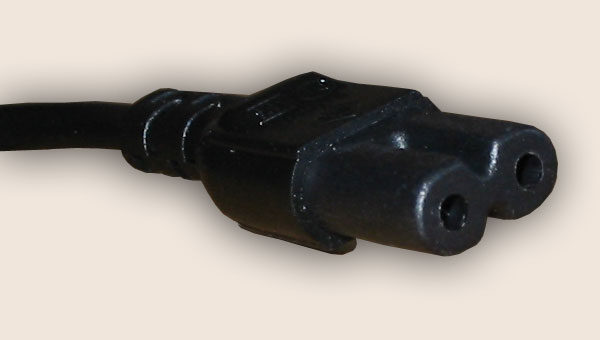
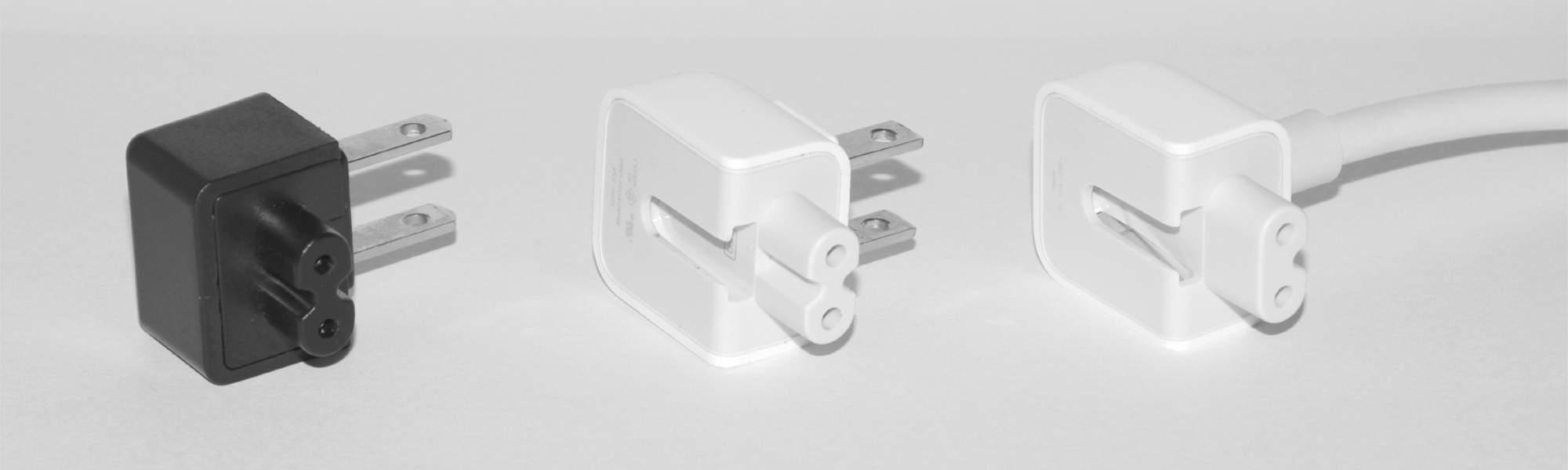

Commonly known as a "figure-8", "infinity" or "shotgun" connector due to the shape of its cross-section, or less commonly, a Telefunken connector after its originator. This coupler is often used for small cassette recorders, battery/mains-operated radios, battery chargers, some full-size audio-visual equipment, laptop computer power supplies, video game consoles, and similar double-insulated appliances.

A C8B inlet type is defined by the standard for use by dual-voltage appliances; it has three pins and can hold a C7 connector in either of two positions, allowing the user to select voltage by choosing the position the connector is inserted.

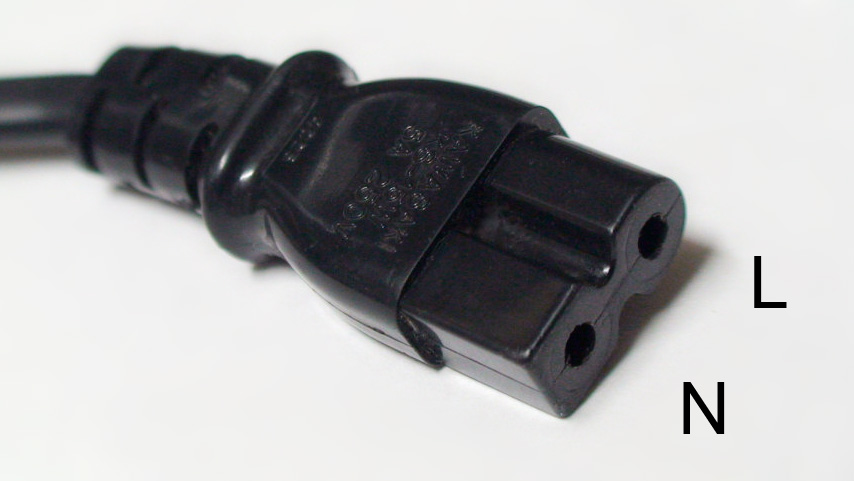

A similar but polarized connector has been made, but is not part of the standard. This connector could be found on the US/Canada models of Sony PlayStation and PS2. Sometimes called C7P, it is asymmetrical, with one side squared. Unpolarized C7 connectors can be inserted into the polarized inlets; however, doing so might be a safety risk if the device is designed for polarized power. Although not specified by IEC 60320, and not clear whether any formal written standard exists, the most common wiring appears to connect the rounded side to the hot (live) line, and the squared to the neutral. Note: Clause 9.5 was added to IEC 60320-1:2015, this requires that "It shall not be possible to engage a part of a non-standard appliance coupler with a complementary part of an appliance coupler complying with the standard sheets in any part of IEC 60320."

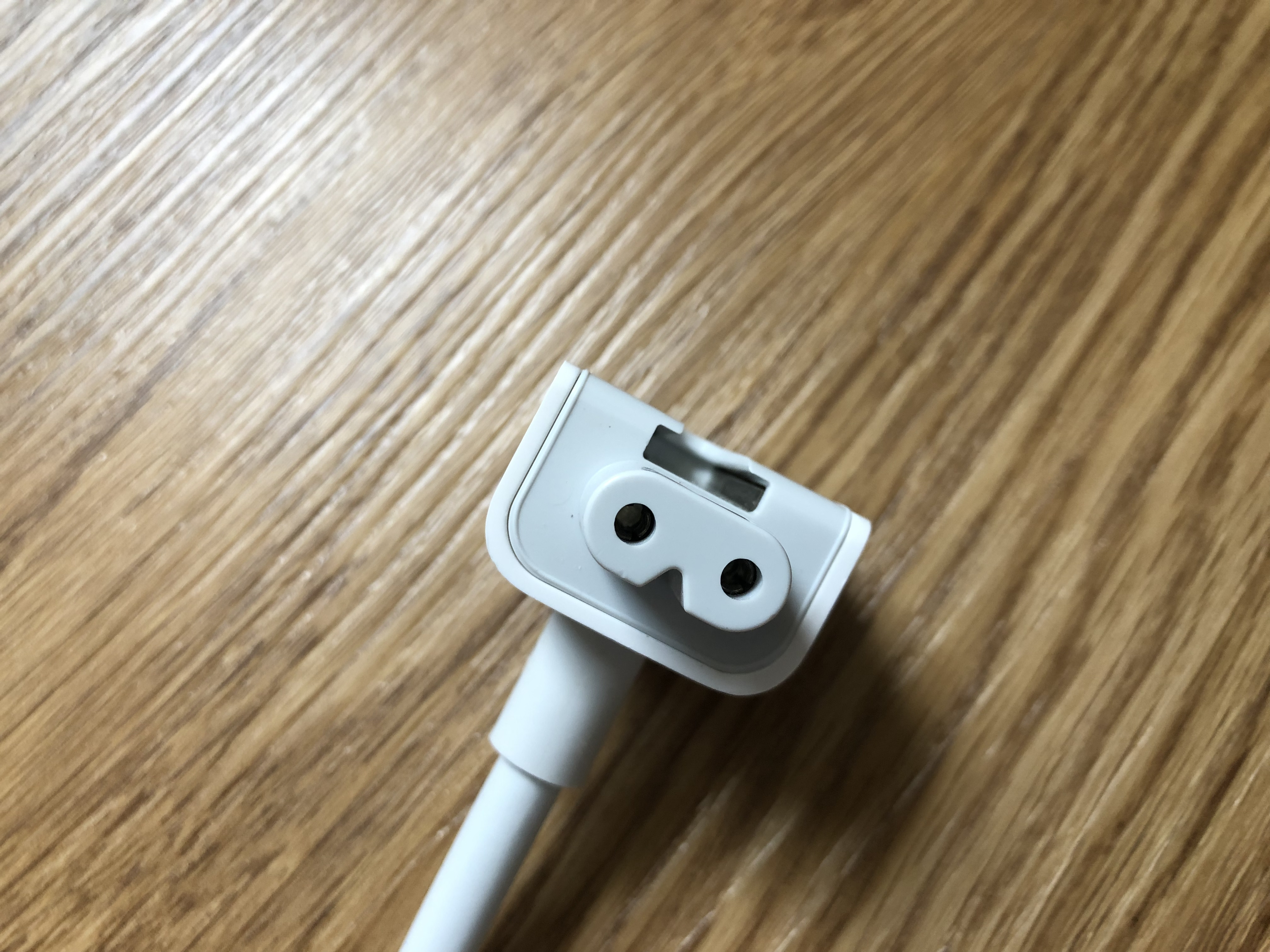
Macbook charger cabled adapter

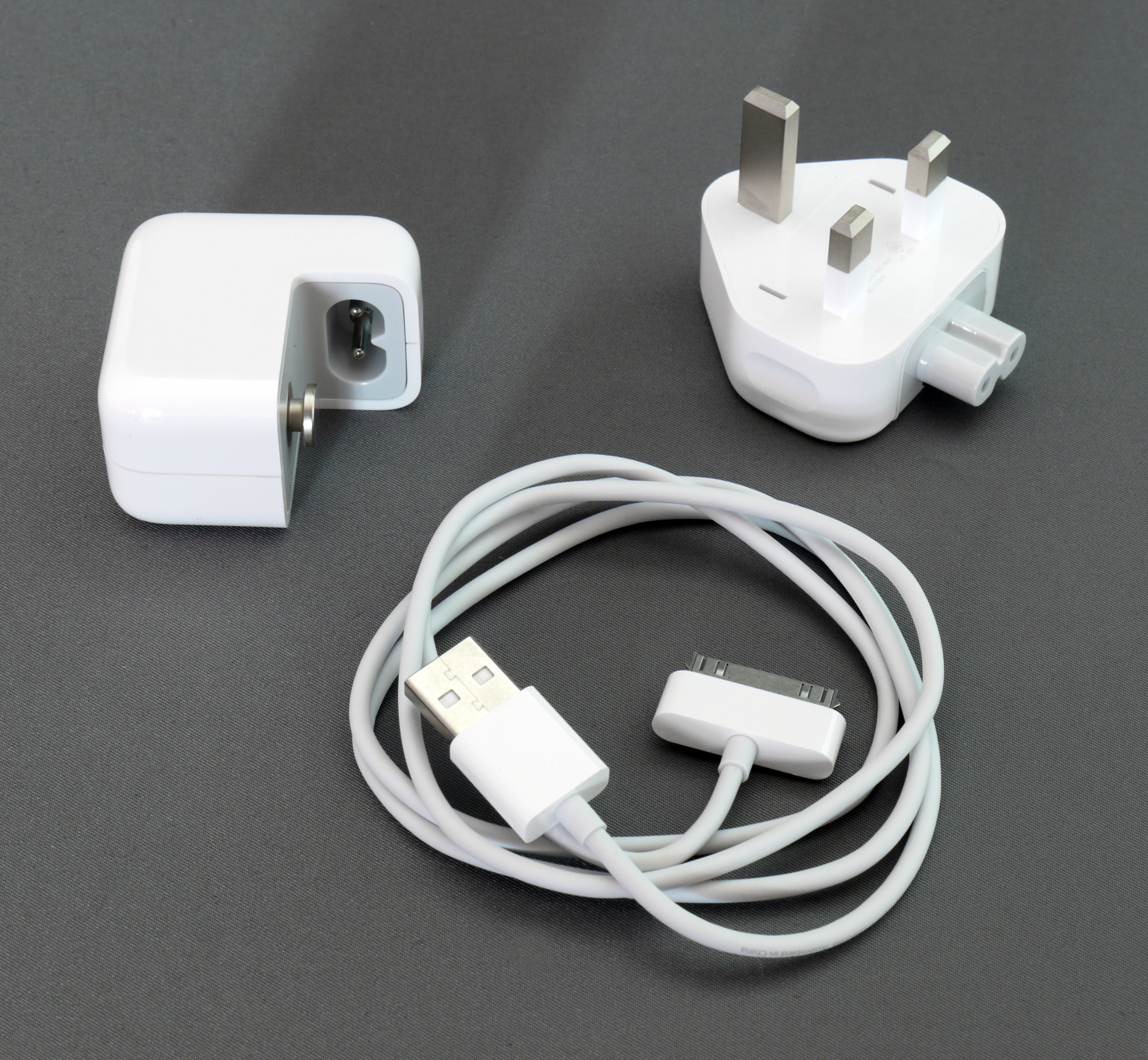
iPad charger with "duckhead"

Apple uses a modified version of the C7 connector for their power adapters. On the power adapter itself, a separate metal slide-on connector exists to both help secure the connection with the wall adapter or cable, as well as provide a ground connection on for the AC adapter end. The design of the power adapter also allows for standard C7 connectors to be used in non-grounded applications.

==== C13/C14 coupler ====
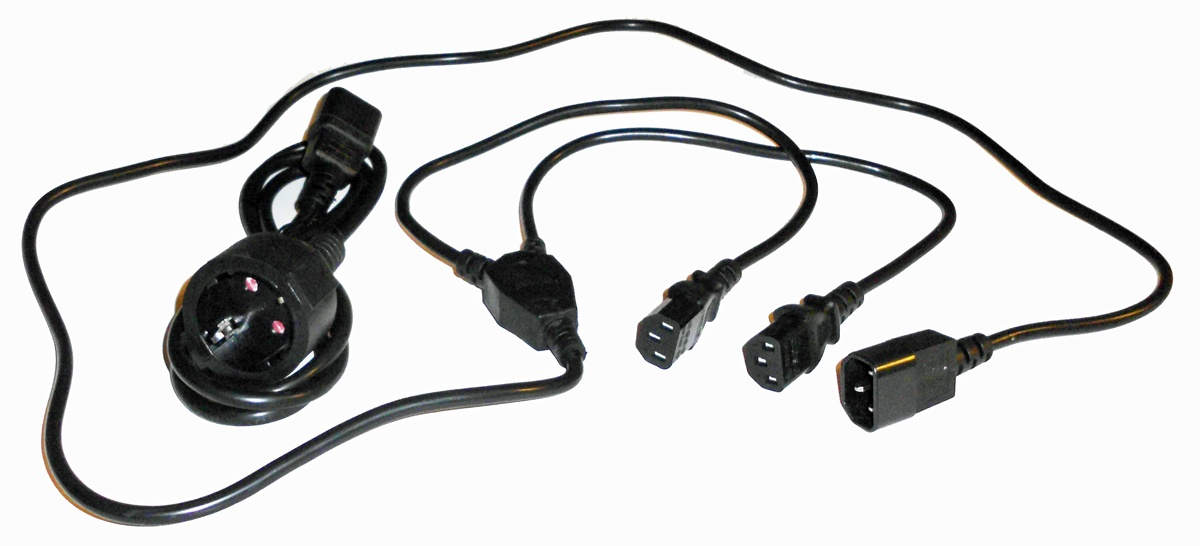
C13/C14 Y-cable

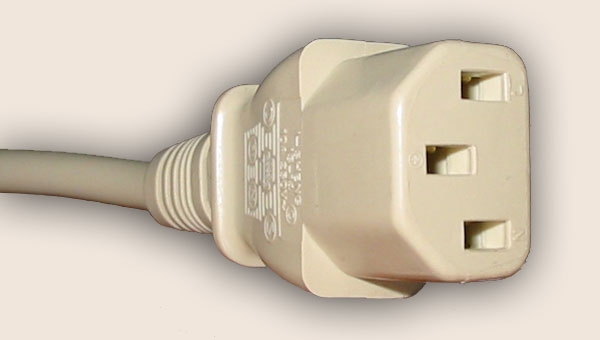
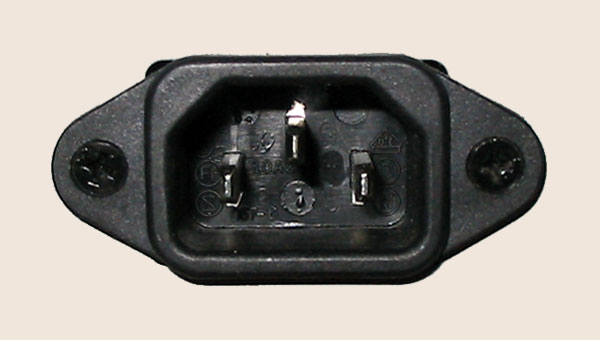

The C13/C14 connector and inlet combination, informally referred to as a "kettle cord" or "kettle lead", are used in a wide variety of electronic equipment ranging from computer components like the power supply, monitors, printers and other peripherals to video game consoles, instrument amplifiers, professional audio equipment and virtually all professional video equipment. An early example of a product that uses this connector is the Apple II. A power cord with a suitable power plug (for the locality where the appliance is being used) on one end and a C13 connector (connecting to the appliance) on the other is commonly called an IEC cord.

There are also a variety of splitter blocks, splitter cables, and similar devices available. These are usually un-fused (with the exception of C13 cords attached to BS 1363 plugs, which are always fused).

A cable consisting of a C13 and an E interconnection connector is commonly mislabeled as an "extension cord", as although that is not the intended purpose, it can be used as such. They are also commonly mislabeled as C14 instead of E.

The C13 connector and C14 inlet are also commonly found on servers, routers, and switches. Power cord sets utilizing a C13 connector and an E interconnection plug are commonplace in data centres to provide power from a power distribution unit (PDU) to a server.

==== C15/C16 coupler ====
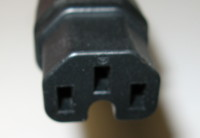

Some electric kettles and similar hot household appliances like home stills use a supply cord with a C15 connector and a matching C16 inlet on the appliance; their temperature rating is 120 °C (248 °F) rather than the 70 °C (158 °F) of the similar C13/C14 combination. The official designation in Europe for the C15/C16 coupler is a "hot-condition" coupler.

These are similar in form to the C13/C14 coupler, except with a ridge opposite the earth in the C16 inlet (preventing a C13 fitting), and a corresponding valley in the C15 connector (which doesn't prevent it fitting a C14 inlet). For example, an electric kettle cord can be used to power a computer, but an unmodified computer cord cannot be used to power a kettle.

There is some public confusion between C13/C14 and C15/C16 couplers, and it is not uncommon for C13/C14 to be informally referred to as "kettle plug" or "kettle lead" (or some local equivalent).

In European countries the C15/C16 coupler has replaced and made obsolete the formerly common types of national appliance coupler in many applications.

==== C15A/C16A coupler ====

This modification of the C15/C16 coupler has an even higher 155 °C (311 °F) temperature rating.

==== C17/C18 coupler ====
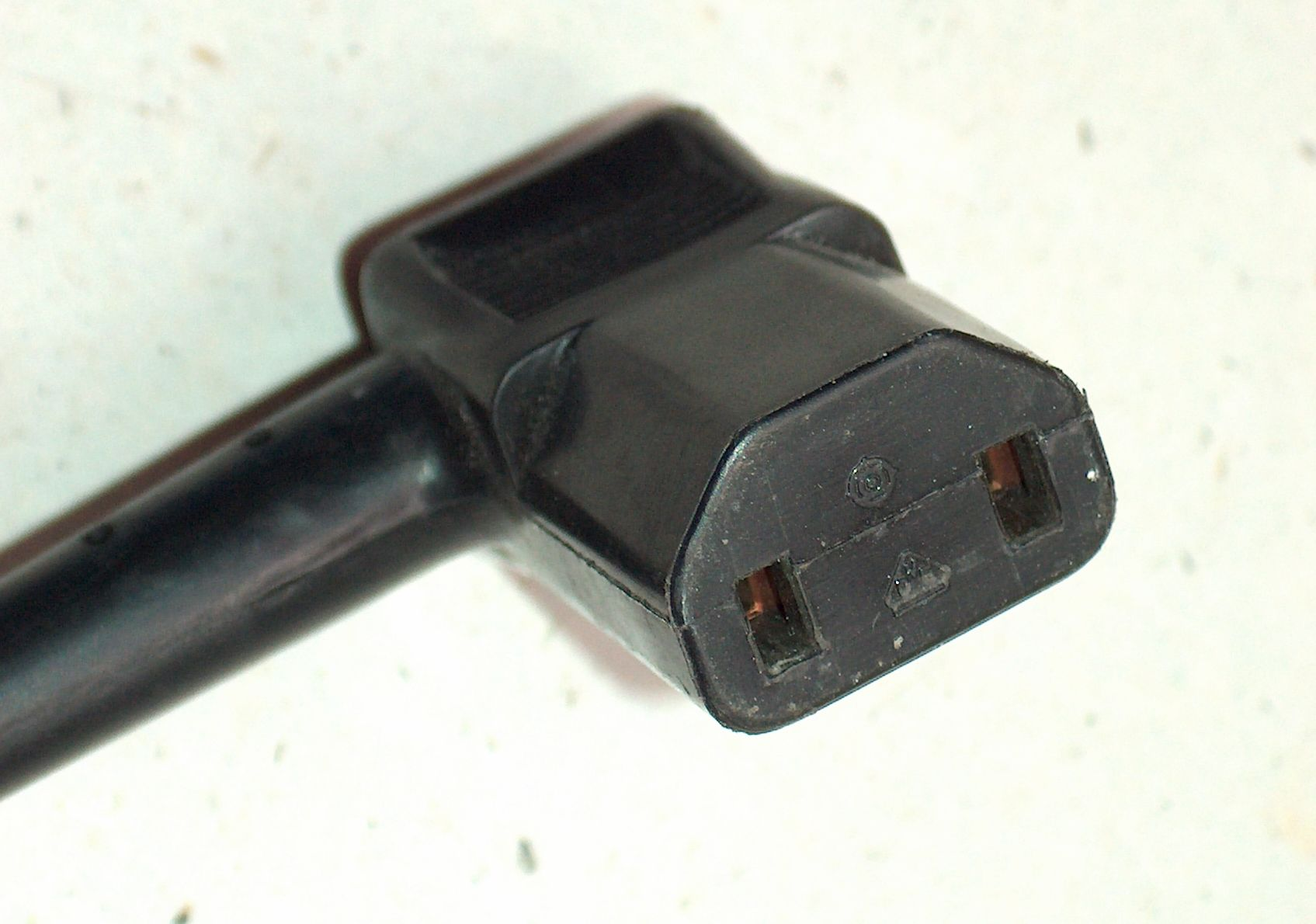
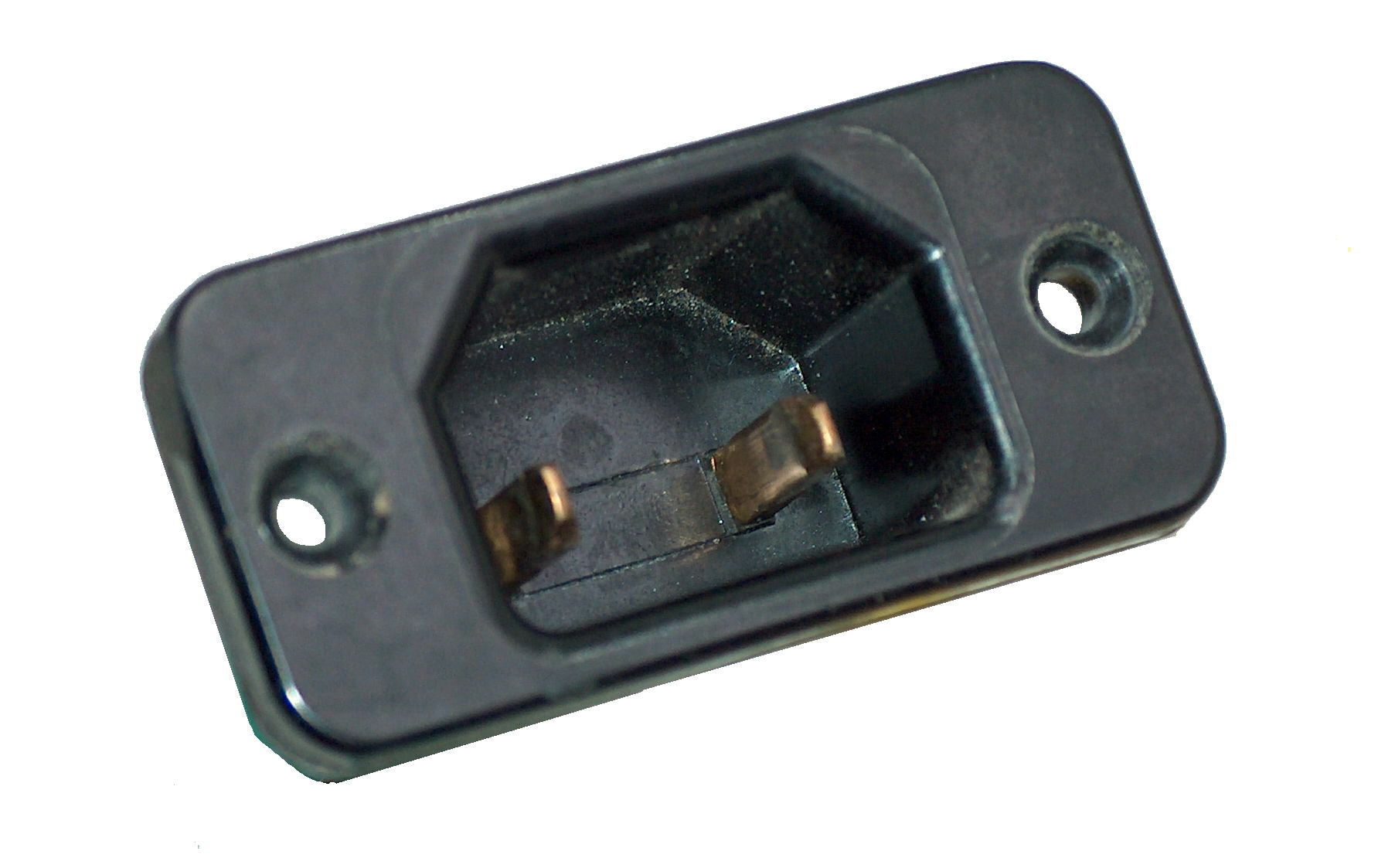

Similar to C13/C14 coupler, but unearthed. A C18 inlet accepts a C13 connector, but a C14 inlet does not accept a C17 connector.

The IBM Wheelwriter series of electronic typewriters are one common application. Three-wire cords with C13 connectors, which are easier to find, are sometimes used in place of the two-wire cords for replacement. In this case, the ground wire will not be connected.

The C17/C18 coupler is often used in audio applications where a floating ground is maintained to eliminate hum caused by ground loops. Other common applications are the power supplies of Xbox 360 game consoles, replacing the C15/C16 coupler employed initially, some PlayStation 4 Pro models, and large CRT televisions manufactured by RCA in the early 1990s.

==== C19/C20 coupler ====
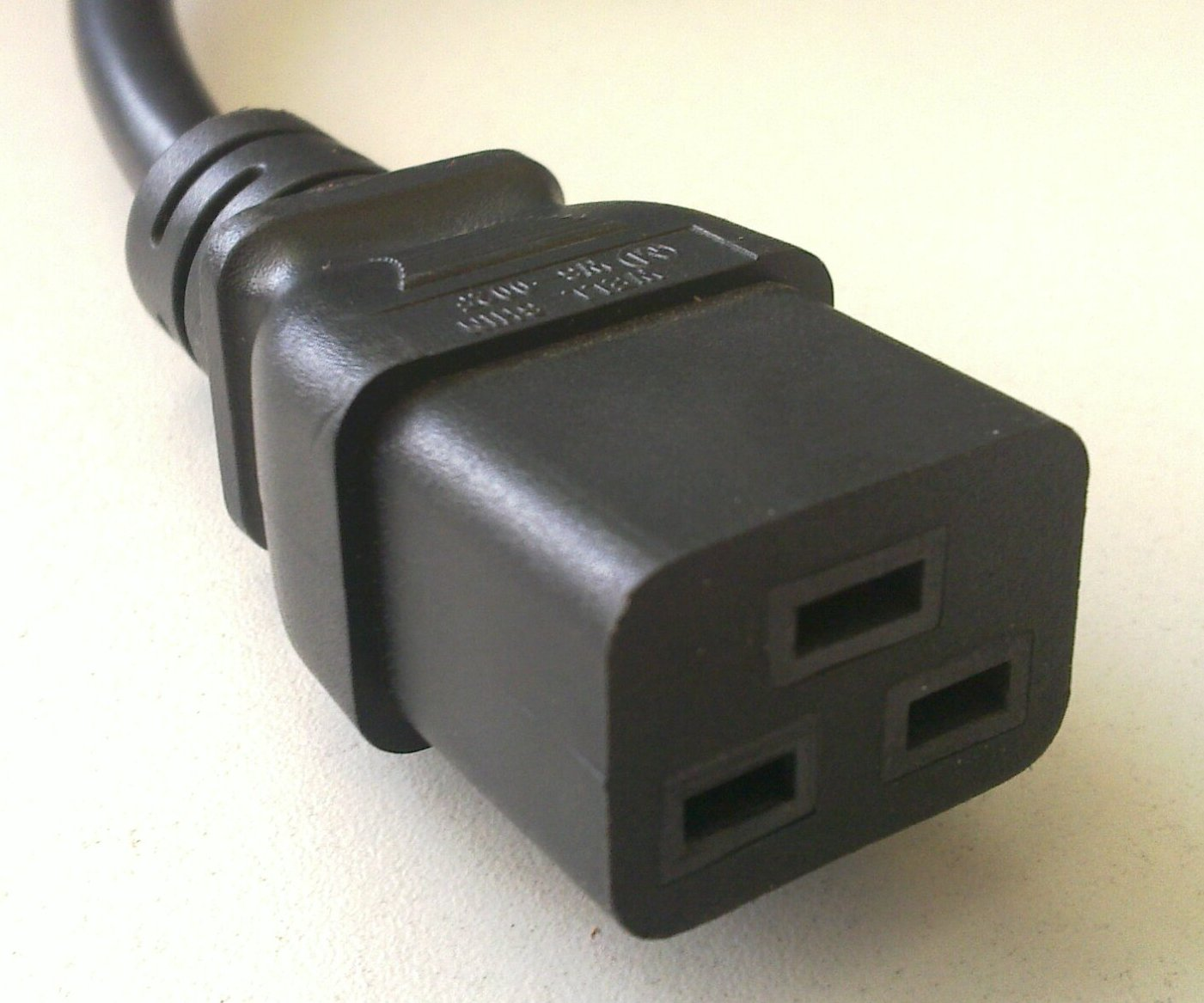
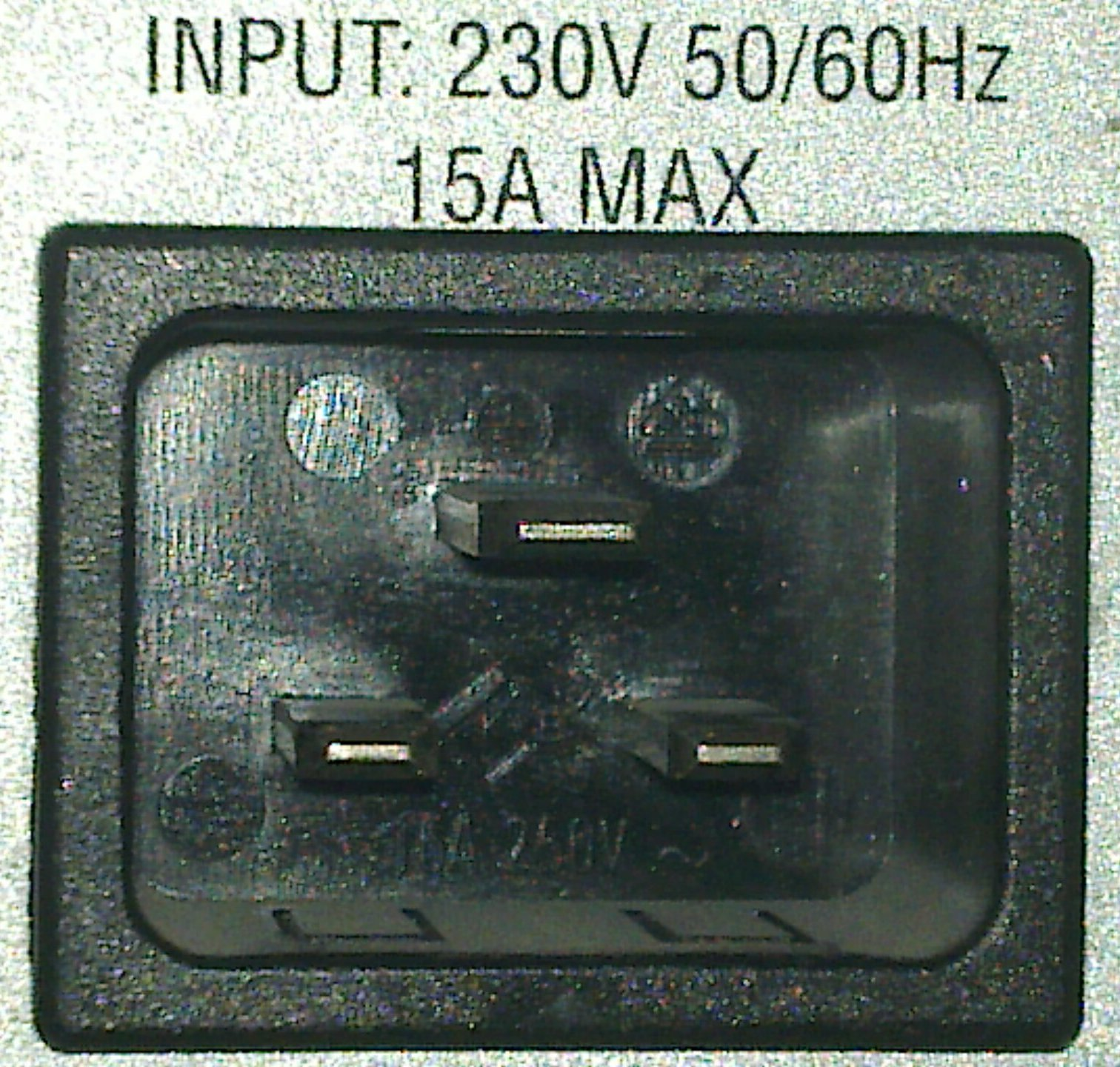

Earthed, 16 A, polarized. This coupler is used for supplying power in IT applications where higher currents are required, for instance on high-power workstations and servers, power to uninterruptible power supplies, power to some power distribution units, large network routers, switches, blade enclosures, and similar equipment. This connector can also be found on high-current medical and scientific equipment. It is rectangular and has pins parallel to the long axis of the coupler face.

=== Interconnection couplers ===
Interconnection couplers are similar to appliance couplers, but with the gender roles reversed. Specifically, the female appliance outlet is built into a piece of equipment, while the male plug connector is attached to a cord. They are identified by letters, not numbers, with one letter identifying the plug connector, and the alphabetical next letter identifying the mating appliance outlet. For example, an E plug fits into an F outlet. Beginning with an amendment published in 2022, three of the commonly used high temperature variants have been standardized as types M–R.

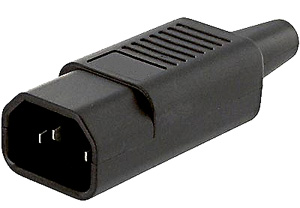
Type E plug connector to IEC 60320-2-2

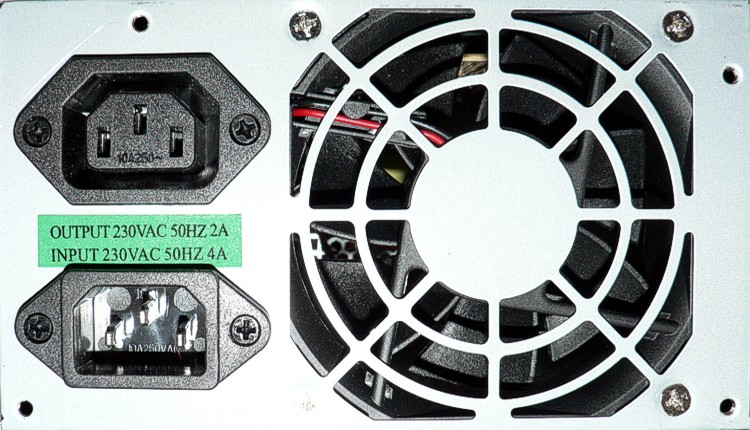
Some older desktop computers provide both a C14 inlet (lower) and a type F outlet (upper) for powering the monitor

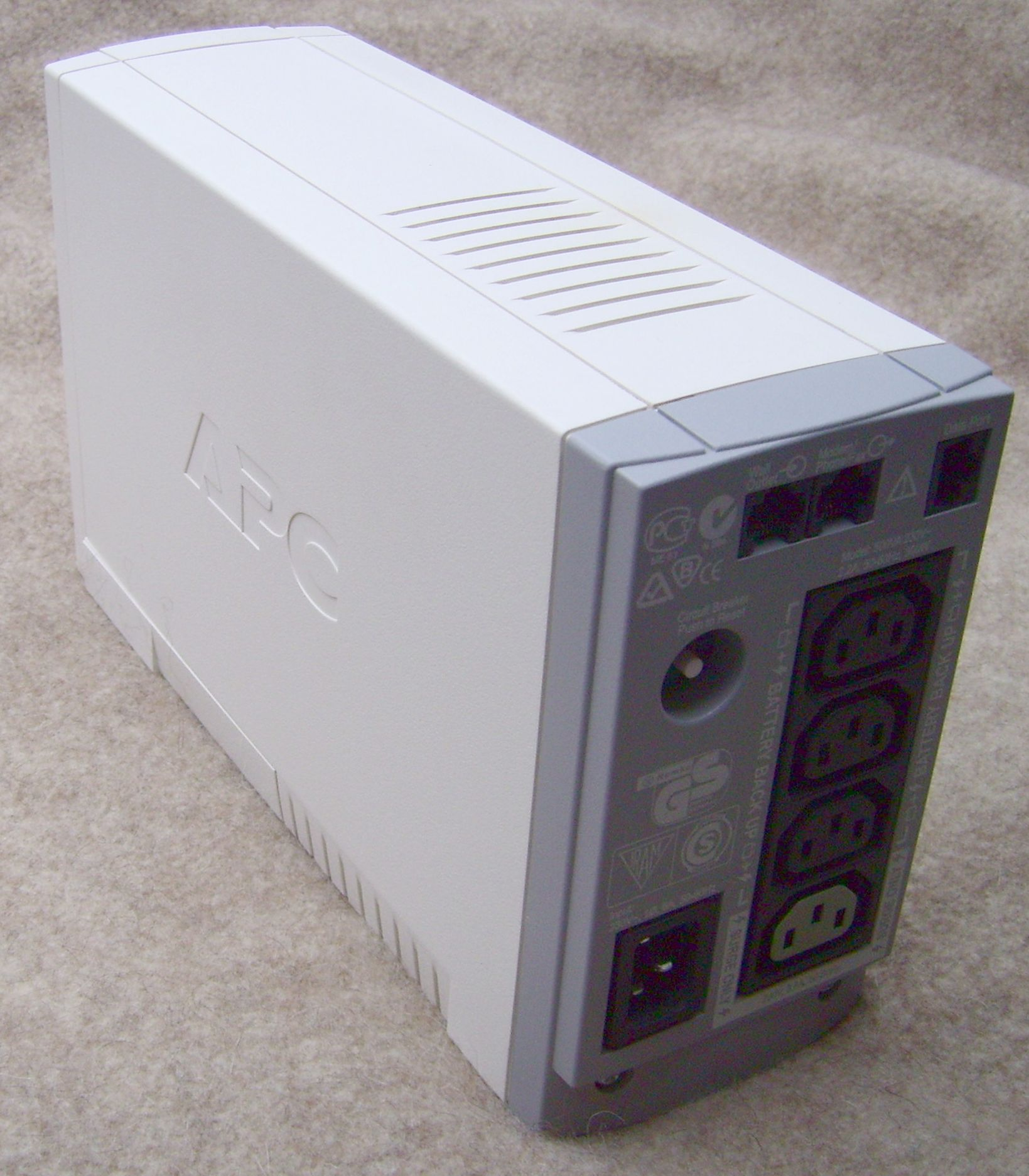
Uninterruptible power supply with a C14 inlet (lower left) and four type F outlets (right)

Cables with a C13 connector at one end and a type E plug connector at the other are commonly available. They have a variety of common uses, including connecting power between older PCs and their monitors, extending existing power cords, connecting to type F outlets strips (commonly used with rack-mount gear to save space and for international standardization) and connecting computer equipment to the output of an uninterruptible power supply (UPS). Type J outlets are used in a similar way.

=== Withdrawn and other standard sheets ===
C3, C4, C11 and C12 standard sheets are no longer listed in the standard.

Standard sheet C25 shows retaining device dimensions. Sheet C26 shows detail dimensions for pillar-type terminals, where the end of the screw bears on a wire directly or through a pressure plate. Sheet 27 shows details for screw terminals, where the wire is held by wrapping it around the head of a screw.

== See also ==
- AC power plugs and sockets
- BS 1363 – British standard for building receptacles and compatible cord connectors
- IEC 60906-1 – A proposed international standard for domestic wall sockets, not yet widely adapted
- IEC 60309 specifies larger couplers for higher currents, higher voltages, and polyphase systems
- CEE 7 standard AC plugs and sockets – used throughout most of continental Europe
- NEMA connector – North American standard for building receptacles and compatible cord connectors
- Power entry module
- SAE_J1772 - the SAE J1772 or "type 1" connector is used for charging electric vehicles
- Type_2_connector - properly known as the "IEC 62196-2" connector, it is used for charging electric vehicles and is the standard for the majority of cars in Europe; it is often one part of the Combined_Charging_System which offers high power DC public charging
