= AS/NZS 3112 =

AC power plug and socket used in Australia and New Zealand

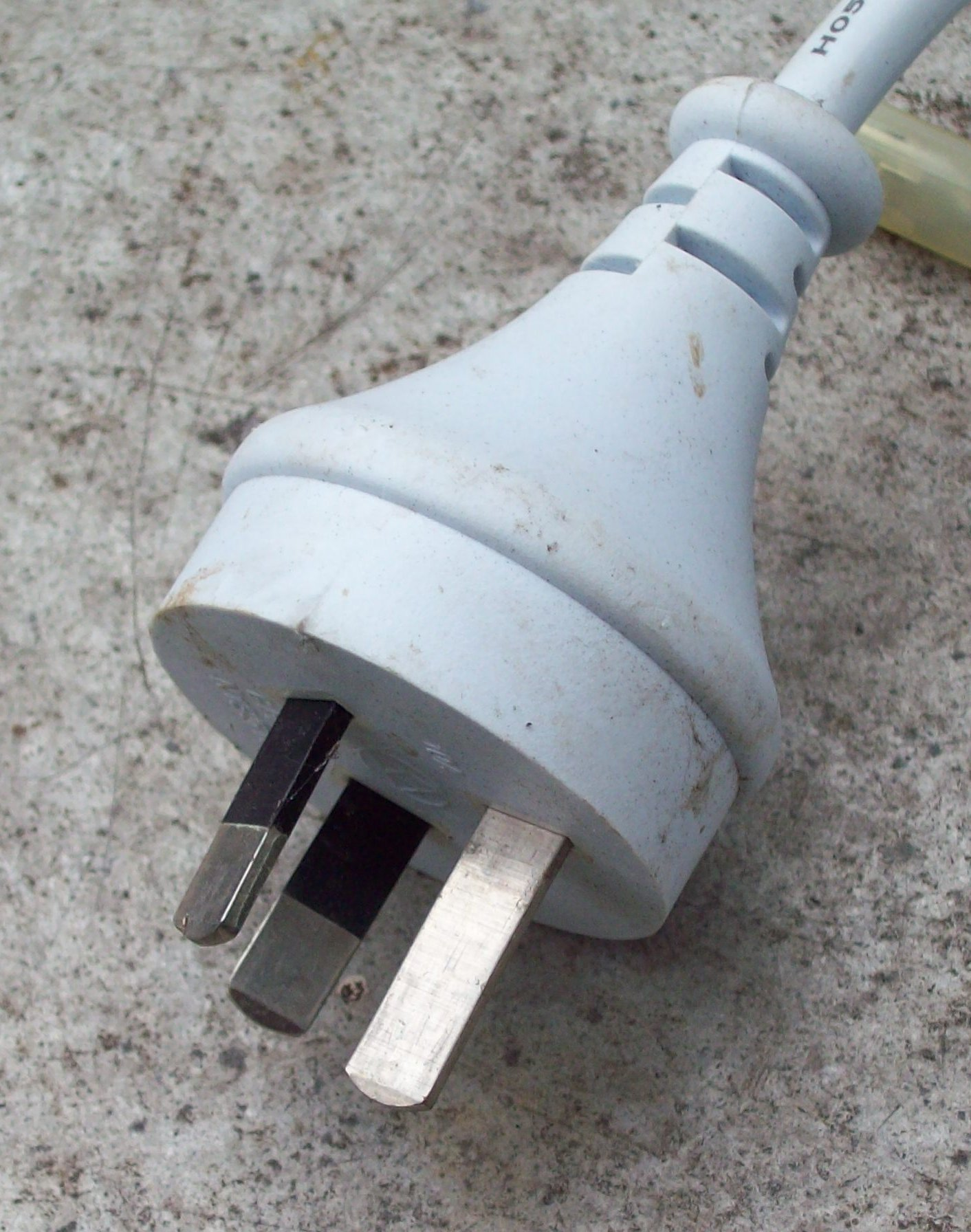
Australasian standard three-pin plug, with part insulation on the Active/Line and Neutral pins.

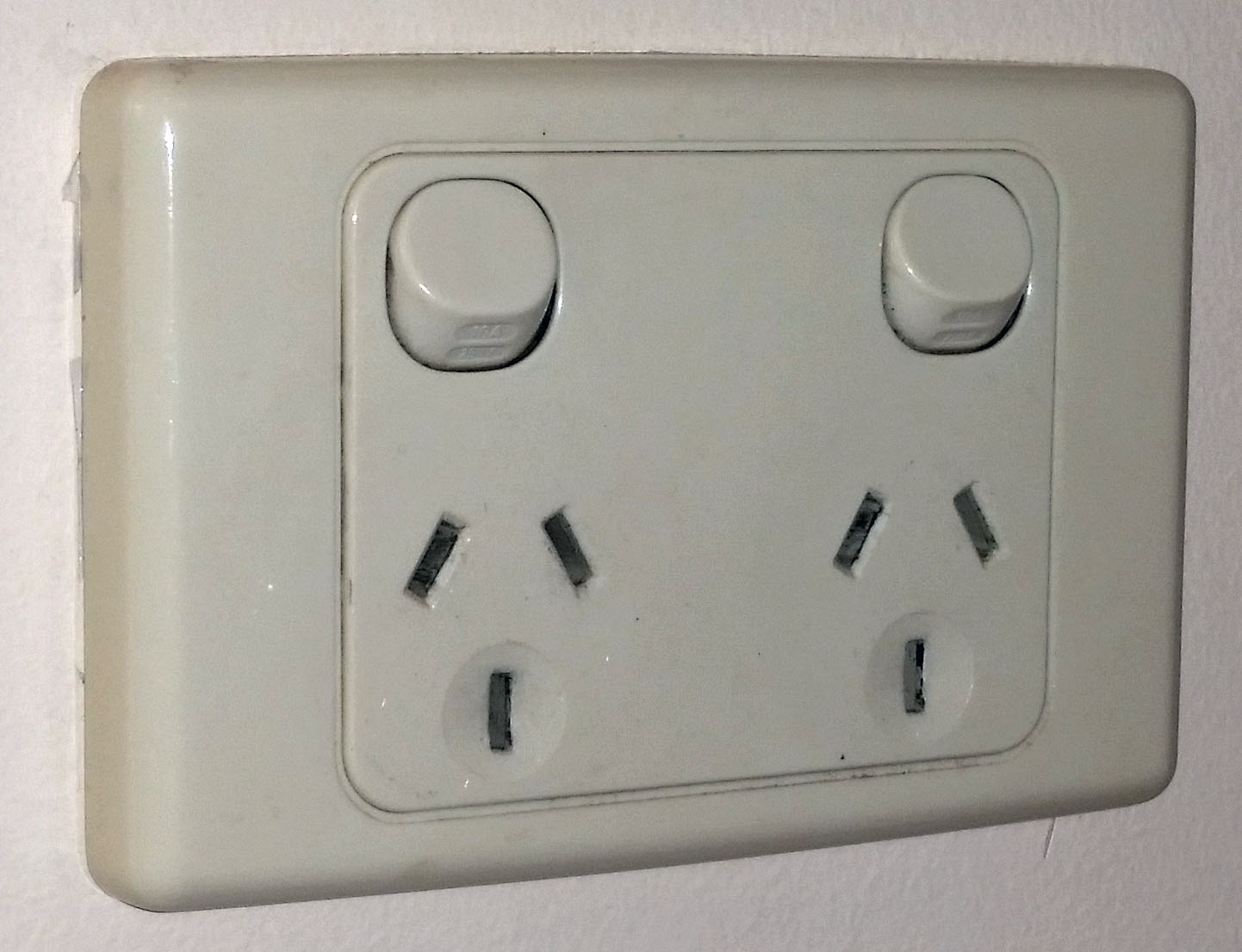
Switched dual 3-pin socket-outlet

AS/NZS 3112 is the harmonised Australian and New Zealand national standard for AC power plugs (male) and sockets (female). The design is defined by the International Electrotechnical Commission (IEC) as the Type I plug. The standard is used in Australia, New Zealand, Fiji, Tonga, Solomon Islands, Papua New Guinea and several other Pacific island countries. Type I is also used in Argentina and China, but each has a separate standard from the Australasian one, despite their almost-identical appearance.

The plug consists of two flat pins forming an inverted V-shape, and a vertical earthing pin below with a slightly longer length. Double insulated appliances may omit the earth pin. When viewing a plug from its face (Earth facing downwards), the top left prong is Neutral and the top right is Active (Live/Phase). In accordance with AS/NZS 3112:2000, all plugs sold since 2004 are required to have insulation halfway down their Active and Neutral prongs.

Since 2000, the nominal voltage in most areas of Australia has been 230 V; the transition was complete by 2022. In New Zealand, the voltage is 230 V. Fiji, Tonga and Papua New Guinea remains at a nominal 240 V, and in the Solomon Islands it is 220 V. The standards of China and Argentina also use the Type I plug and socket, though the Live (Active) and Neutral pins are swapped in Argentina, and neither includes insulation on these prongs. In both countries the voltage is 220 V, and the outlets are sometimes mounted upside-down with the earth pin at the top for safety. Differences in voltage/polarity may give rise to compatibility issues, especially for travellers and those purchasing appliances overseas or online. Most 230 V equipment will work with a supply voltage in the range 220–240 V without issues. The mains frequency is 50 Hz in all these countries.

== History ==
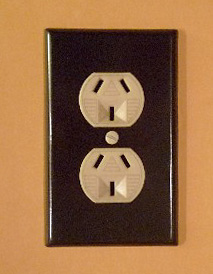
Now obsolete American 3-pin duplex socket-outlet

Australia's standard plug/socket system was originally codified as standard C112 (floated provisionally in 1937, and adopted as a formal standard in 1938). The Australian standard of 1937 was the result of a "gentlemen's agreement", reportedly from 1930, between manufacturers Fred Cook of Ring-Grip, Geoffrey Gerard of Gerard Industries and Brian Harper Miller of the State Electricity Commission of Victoria (SECV). The design was based on an American plug and socket-outlet first intended for use at 120 V which was patented in 1916 under U.S. patent 1,179,728 by Harvey Hubbell. By the early 1930s this design had been up-rated to 250 V 10 A capacity and Hubbell had supplied the Australian electrical industry with his sockets. Current Australian plugs fit these American outlets perfectly. (While this socket-outlet never became a NEMA standard design, the 50 A NEMA 10-50R, has a similar pin configuration in a larger form.) Argentina, Uruguay, and China based their plugs and sockets on the same design. New Zealand also adopted the Australian design, since Australian equipment and many electrical appliances were exported to that country.

One of the reasons behind the adoption of that particular design was that it was cheap to make, with the flat pins being able to be easily stamped out of sheet brass, in contrast to round pins or thicker rectangular ones used in other countries. This was also a consideration when the Chinese authorities officially adopted the design in relatively recent times, despite the considerable inroads the British plug had made, because of its use in Hong Kong. The Chinese socket is normally mounted with the earth pin at the top. This is considered to offer some protection should a conductive object fall between the plug and the socket.

In Australia, the C112 standard was superseded by AS 3112 in 1990. A major update was released in 2000 as AS/NZS 3112:2000, which mandated active and neutral insulated pins on the plugs sold for use with these socket-outlets after 3 April 2005. This significantly reduces the risk of electric shock from accidentally touching the pins of a partially inserted plug. The standard AS/NZS 3112:2004 introduced more stringent testing procedures to test for bending of the pins and subtle changes to the radius of the pin tips. The current version is AS/NZS 3112:2017.

== Description ==
AS/NZS 3112 compliant plugs have two flat pins forming an inverted V-shape plus a vertical earthing pin. The flat blades measure 6.35 by 1.6 mm (1/4 by 1/16 in) with the active (line) and neutral pins 17.35 mm (11/16 in) long set 30° to the vertical and the vertical earth pin being 20 mm (0.787 in) in length. The pins are arranged at 120° angles around a common midpoint, with the active and neutral centred 7.92 mm (5/16 in) from the midpoint, and the earth pin centred 10.31 mm (3/8 in) away.

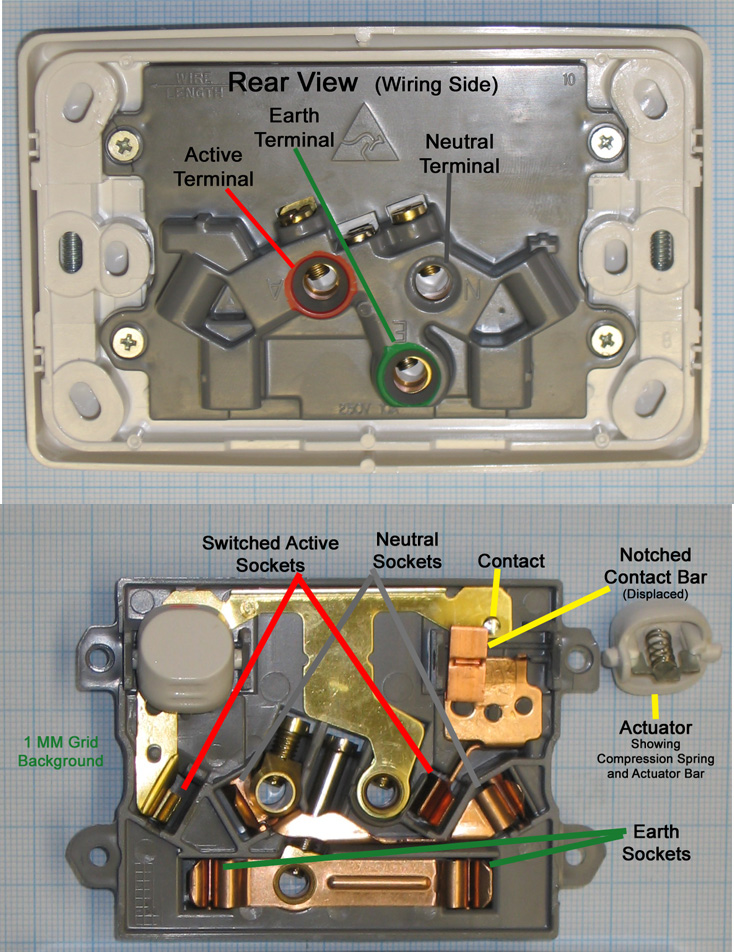
Dual 3-pin socket-outlet construction

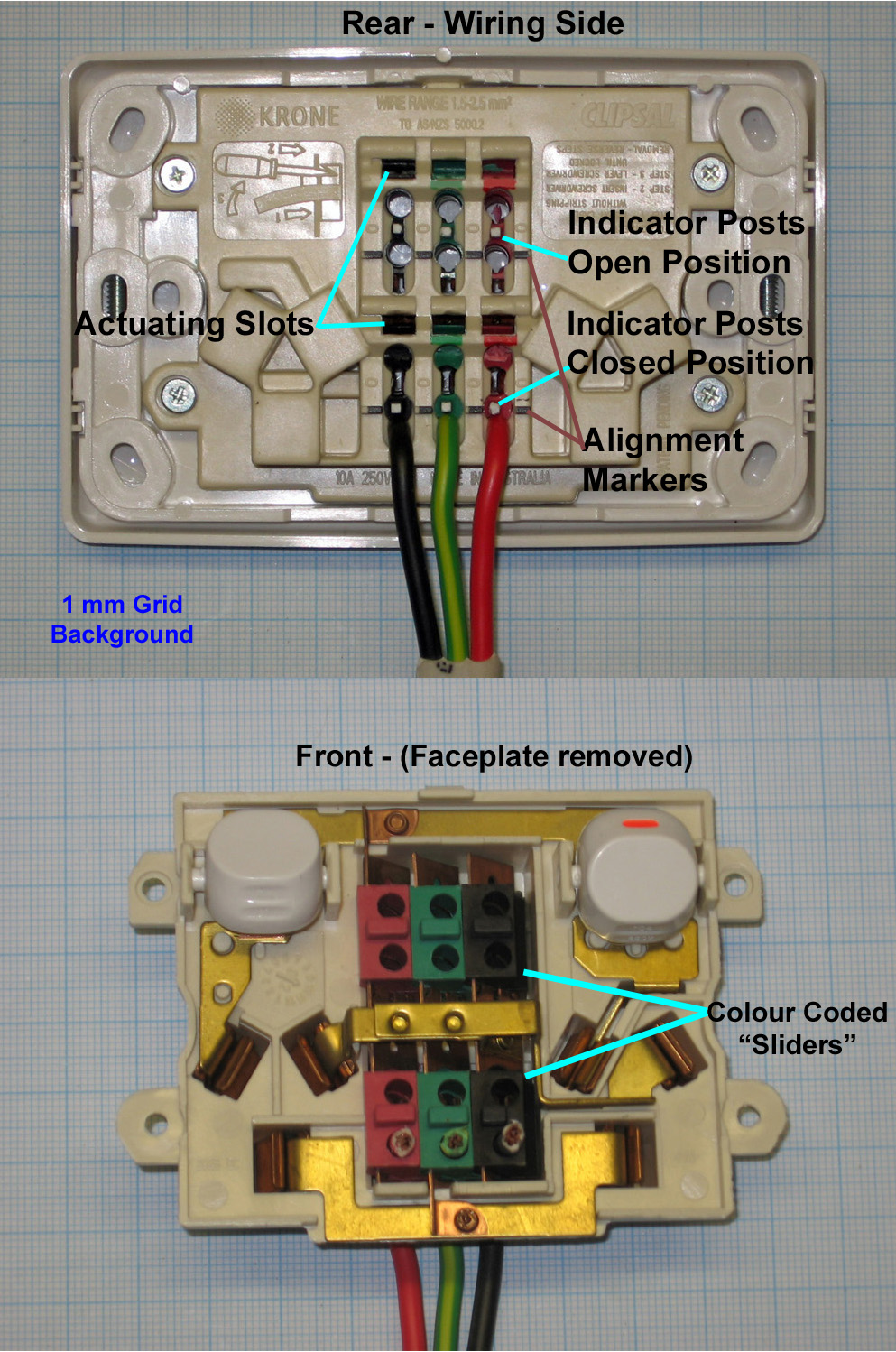
Socket-outlet, using insulation displacement as a means of connecting to low voltage (230 V) supply conductors

A standard socket-outlet provides a nominal RMS voltage of 230 volts at a maximum of 10 amps and always includes an earth connection. "Shuttered" socket-outlets are available, but these are not required by regulation.

There are unearthed versions of the plug used with this outlet having only the two flat inverted V-aligned pins, without the earthing pin. Such plugs are only to be used for devices where other safety standards are in use (e.g. double insulation). They are not available separately but only integrally with power cords specifically designed for the purpose.

A view of the wiring side of a typical dual socket-outlet is also shown on the right, together with an annotated view of the mechanism, without the front cover. (One "rocker" switch has been disassembled to show its operation.)

If required, such dual socket-outlets can be obtained (at additional cost) using insulation displacement as a means of connecting to the supply conductors, as can be seen in the illustration – below. The benefits claimed for their use in these applications include up to 50% faster installation, due to the reduction in the stripping, twisting and screwing down processes.

== Switch requirements ==
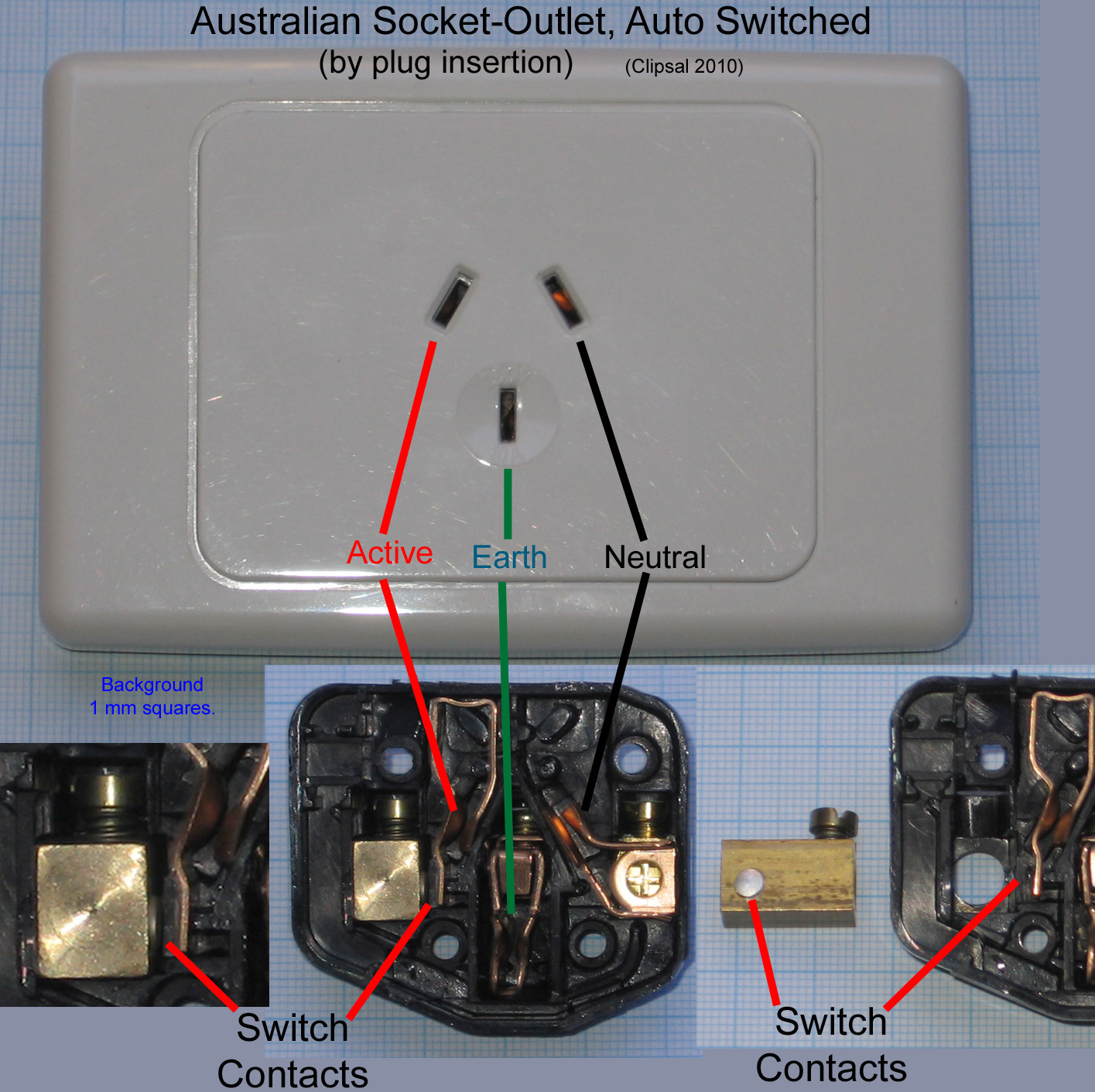
Socket-outlet, auto switched by plug insertion. Automatically switched socket-outlets such as these may be used to supply power to refrigerators, some computers and other accessories that normally should not be switched off. The absence of a user operable switch prevents the accidental switching off of such devices

Regulations require socket-outlets to be "individually controlled by a separate switch that ... operates in all active conductors", subject to three "exceptions":

- "A single switch may be used for the control of two socket-outlets located immediately adjacent to each other". (subject to the current rating of the switch to be at least equal to the (a) total current rating of the sockets concerned; or (b) the current rating of the overcurrent protection device concerned, whichever is the lesser value.)
- "A socket-outlet that is switched by the insertion and withdrawal of the plug shall be deemed to meet the requirements ...." (Such a socket-outlet and the mechanism used is pictured.)
- "A socket-outlet that is rated at not more than 10 A, installed for the connection of a fixed or stationary appliance or a luminaire and that is not readily accessible for other purposes, need not be controlled by a switch". (Such a socket-outlet and plug, installed in a ceiling space, is shown below.)

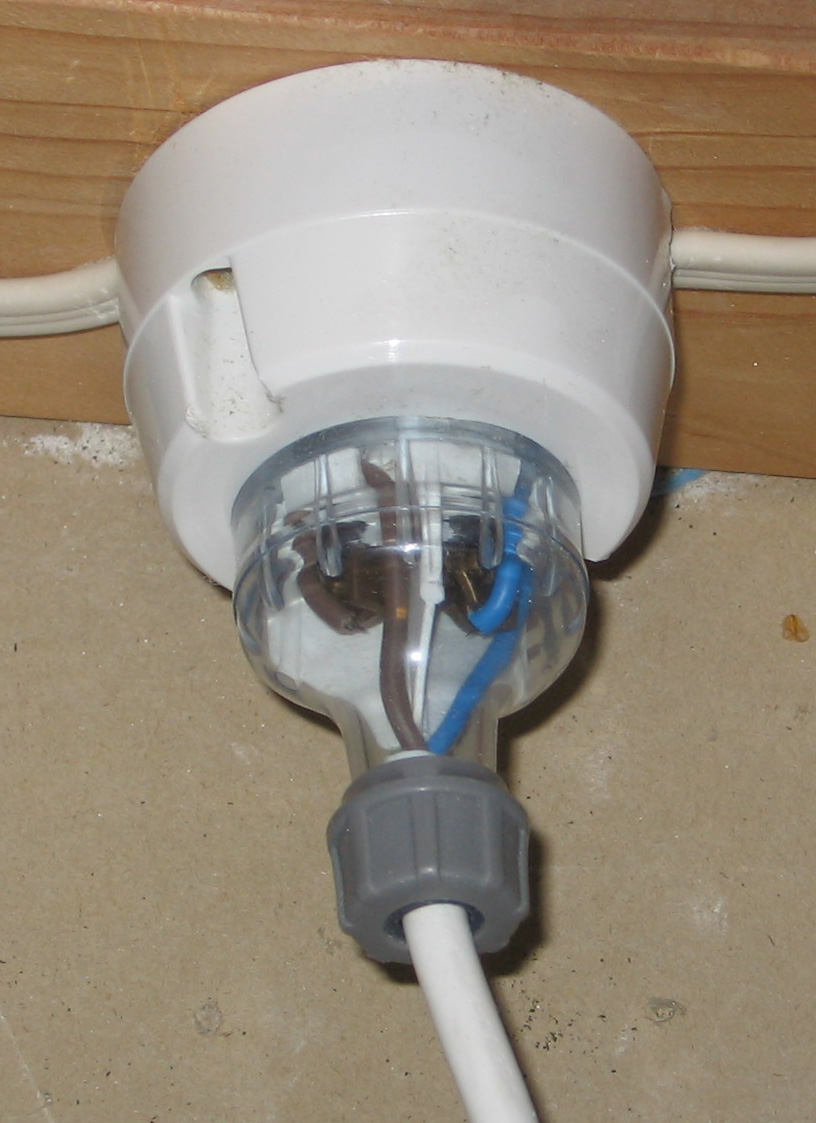
Surface socket-outlet and plug

However, "stationary appliances" (such as fans) and most "luminaires" may be controlled by a remote switch, which would switch the supply via the socket-outlet concerned. Exceptions could be devices such as illuminated "Exit" signs, which require connection to the power supply at all times.

Each switch or means of operating a switch, for a socket-outlet shall be (a) as close as practicable to the socket-outlet, and (b) marked to indicate the socket-outlet(s) or the connected electrical equipment that it controls, with the exception that marking is not required where the socket-outlet controlled is obvious because of the location of the switch.

Double pole switches are required in caravans and mobile homes:

- All switches installed in transportable structures and intended to be connected to the site supply shall operate in all live (active and neutral) conductors."
- Switches that directly control socket-outlets shall comply with the above requirements."

== Variants ==
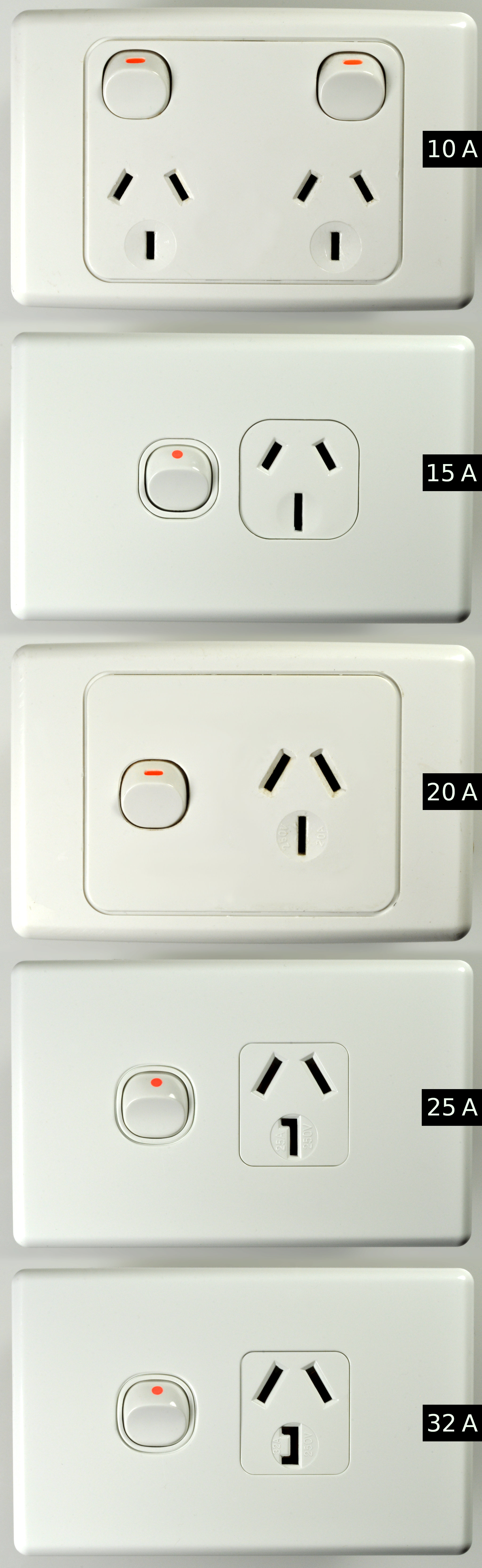
Australian mains socket outlets for different current ratings. Starting with the basic 10 A socket outlet, the width of the earth pin is first increased, the width of the Line and Neutral pins are then increased and the shape of the earth pin is then changed, permitting only plugs of an equal or lesser current rating to be inserted into any socket outlet.

Standard single phase 230 V domestic socket outlets in Australia and New Zealand are rated at 10 A.

However, for heavier duty applications there are several variants having current ratings of up to 32 A:

- The 15 A outlet has a wider earth pin than the 10 A outlet.
- The 20 A outlet has a wider earth pin and wider Line and Neutral pins.
- The 25 A outlet has an inverted L-shaped earth pin and wider Line and Neutral pins.
- The 32 A outlet has a sideways U-shaped earth pin and wider Line and Neutral pins.

From this it may be seen that any plug can be inserted into a socket outlet of the same or higher rating but cannot be inserted into a socket outlet of lower rating.

Hence, a 10 A plug will fit into all of the five types of socket outlets, a 15 A plug will fit into all except a 10 A (and so on) while a 32 A plug will fit only into a 32 A socket outlet.

In general, only 10 A and 15 A socket outlets are likely to be encountered in domestic or commercial installations. Higher rated socket outlets are sometimes used for connection of electric ovens in domestic kitchens. These sockets are rarely seen in industrial environments, where AS/NZS 3123 weather-proof sockets are generally preferred.

A variant of the Australian standard 10 amperes plug has a socket on the back to allow connection of a second appliance to the same outlet. This type of plug is known officially as a "socket adapter plug" but is referred to colloquially, in Australia, as a "piggy-back plug", or in New Zealand, as a "tap-on" plug and is shown below. In Australia the plug is now available only as part of a pre-assembled extension cord, or by special order. In New Zealand, re-wireable PDL 940 "tap-on" plugs are more widely available.

Other variants include plug/sockets with a rating of 10 A using a round earth pin, which is used on "special use" circuits, such as storage heaters in classrooms; and a 110 V 10 A version that has round active & neutral pins with a flat earth pin. The latter is rated at only 110 V (since certain [foreign] 110 V plugs could be inserted into the socket-outlet) and may be used on PAR 64 lights, where two 110 volt 1000 watt lamps are used in series.

The active terminal is the first 'socket' from the earth 'socket' in a clockwise direction when viewing the front of a socket-outlet. Care should be taken if Argentinian standards or faulty wiring swaps the active and neutral pins. Care should also be taken with the 10 A version with the round pin as physically compatible, but electrically incompatible NEMA 7–15 connector used for 277 V 15 A connections is encountered in commercial or industrial settings in the Americas.

While never "codified", since the 1960s it has become "normal" for socket-outlets manufactured for use in Australia/New Zealand to have the earth pin facing downwards, so that the longer earth pin will be the last to lose contact if the inserted plug is tugged downwards. Many products such as "side-entry" plugs (with the cord exit in the 5 o'clock/135-degree position) and extra low voltage "plug packs" are manufactured for use in Australia/New Zealand assuming that the socket into which they will be inserted has the earth pin downwards.

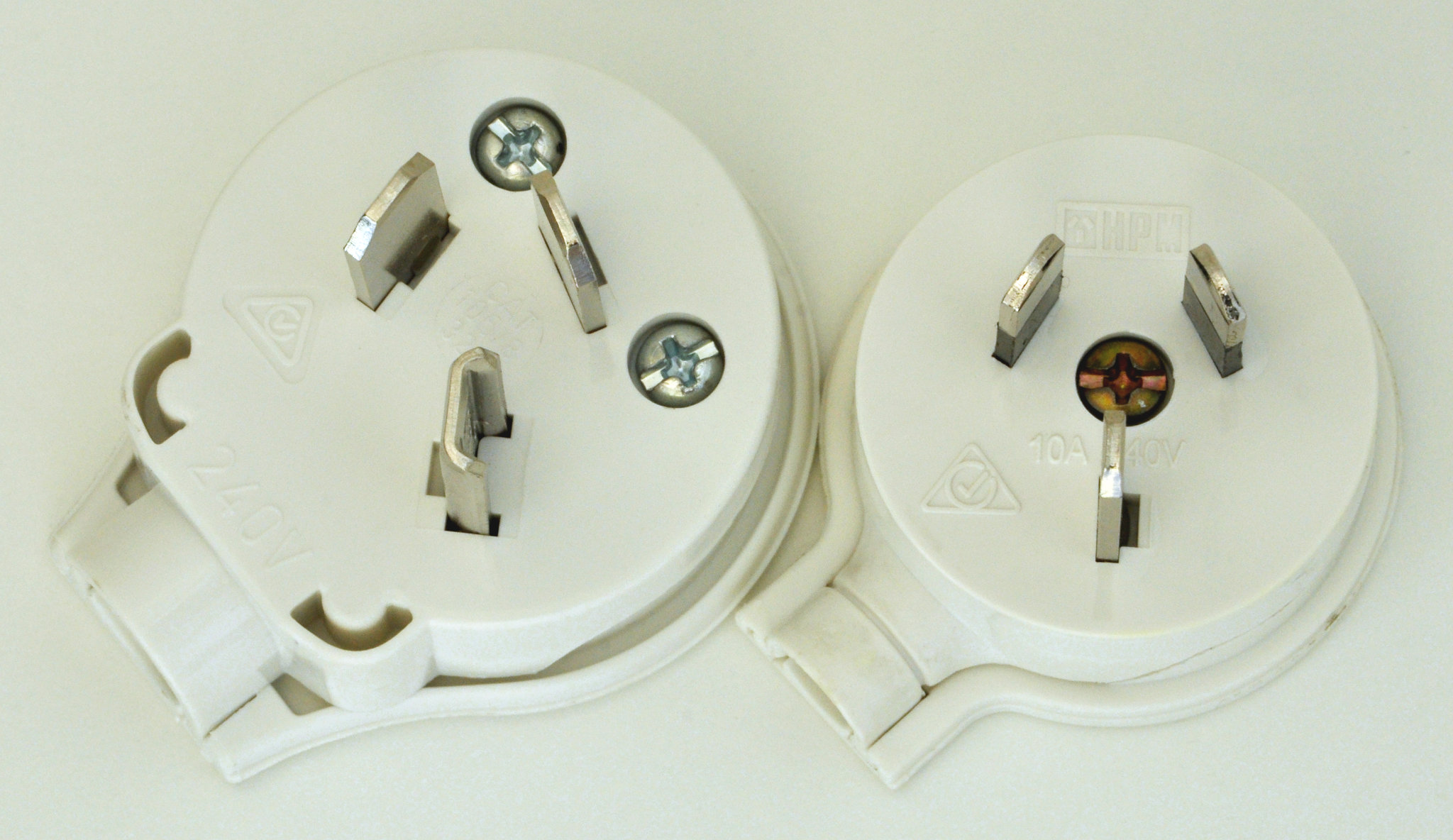
Comparison of 32 A (left) and 10 A (right) plugs.

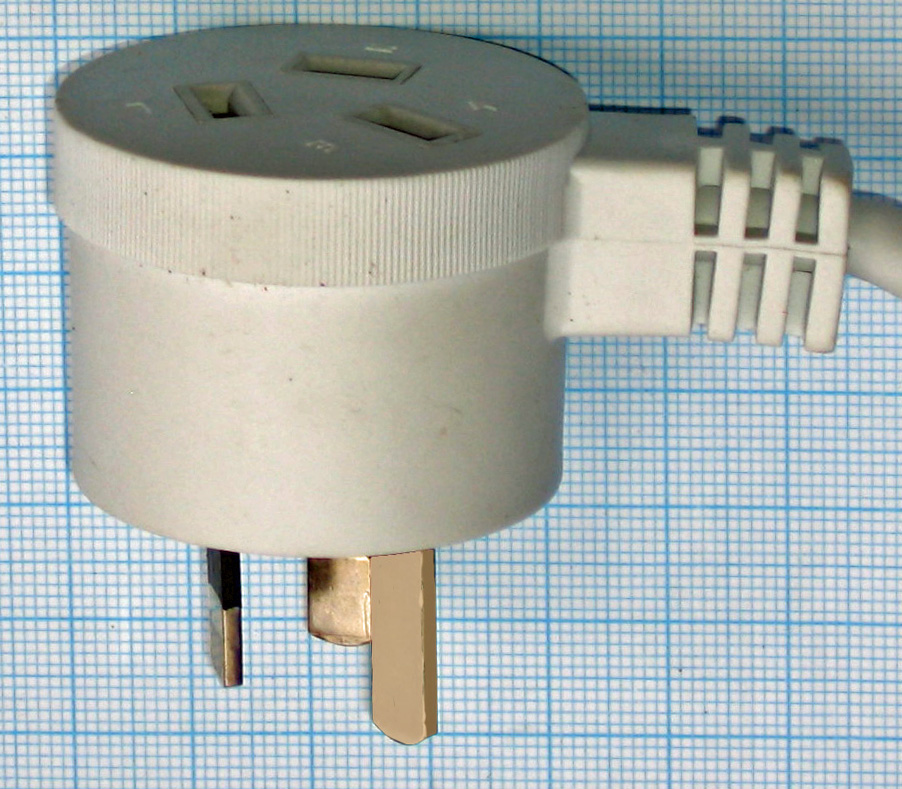
Socket Adapter Plug

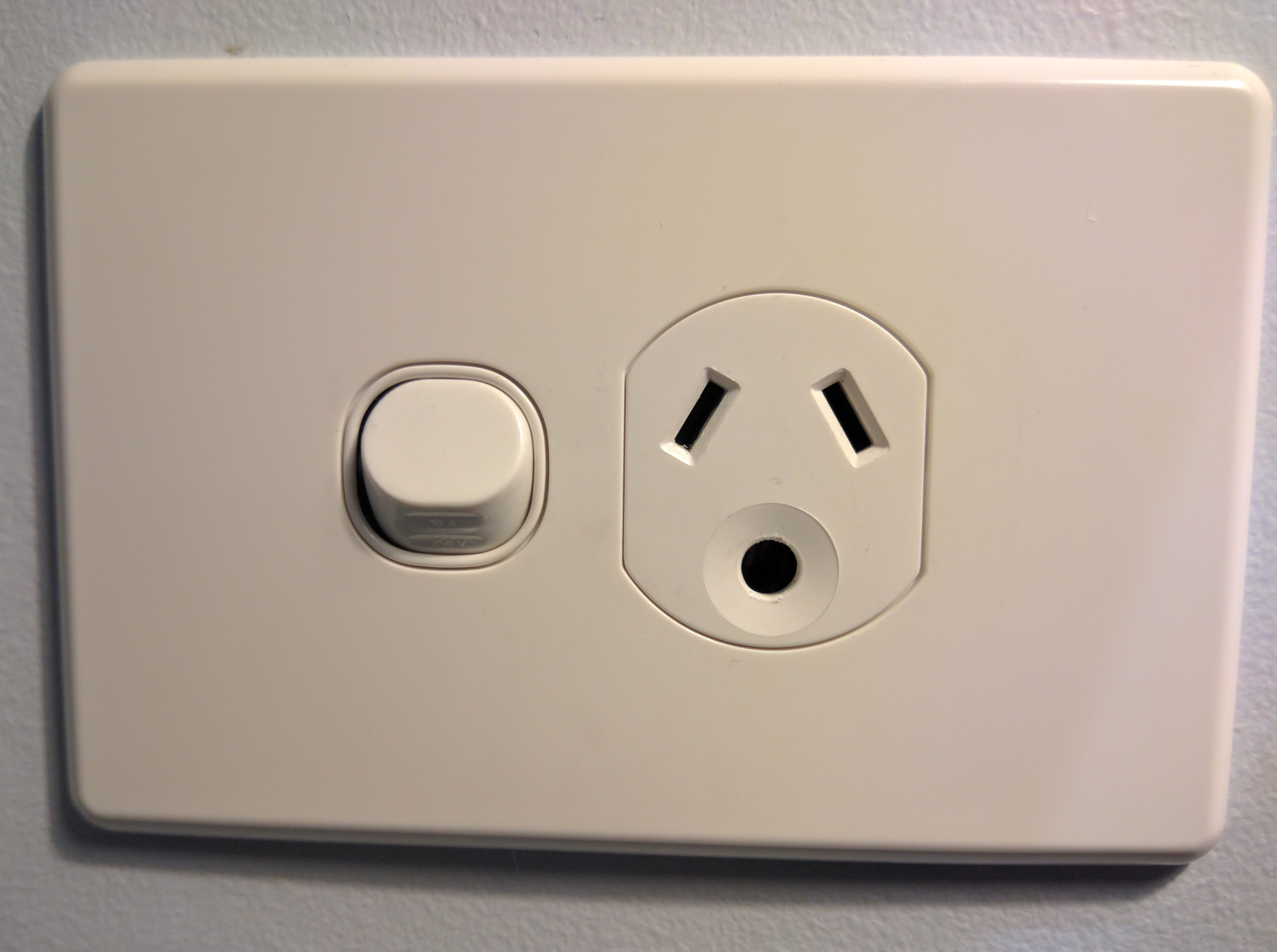
Socket with a round earth pin

== Voltage ==
In 1980, the International Electrotechnical Commission (IEC) rationalised the 220 V and 240 V nominal voltage levels around the world to a consistent 230 V. This rationalisation was ostensibly made to improve the economics of making appliances by allowing manufacturers to produce a range of items with a rated voltage of 230 V. Not all countries have yet converted to the new standard.

The nominal voltage in most areas of Australia had been set at 240 V in 1926. In 2000, Standards Australia issued a system Standard AS60038, with 230 V as the nominal voltage with a +10% to −6% variation at the point of supply, i.e., 253 V to 216.2 V. A new power quality standard, AS 61000.3.100, was released in 2011 that details additional requirements. The new standard stipulates a nominal 230 V, and the allowable voltage to the customer's point of supply is, as mentioned, +10% to −6%. However, the preferred operating range is +6% to −2%. (244 V–225 V).

In Australia, the actual voltages delivered to customers is set at the state/territory level. As of 2022, all states/territories (excluding Western Australia, which remains at 240 V) have transitioned to 230 V standards. Queensland began the transition to 230 V in 2017. The reason given for Queensland's decision to move was the increased use of grid-tied rooftop solar installations raising the grid voltage. By lowering the voltage to 230 V, additional headroom of 960 megawatts was created to accommodate future residential power generation from rooftop solar.

The voltage in Fiji, Tonga, and Papua New Guinea is still 240 V. In China, the Solomon Islands, and Argentina the voltage is 220 V.

== Derived Type I standards ==
Plug differences
Standard	Plug diameter	Grounding pin length	Neutral pin length
Argentinian	37 mm	21.4 mm	18.2 mm
Australian			17 mm
Chinese	37 mm	21 mm	18 mm

=== Chinese GB 1002 ===
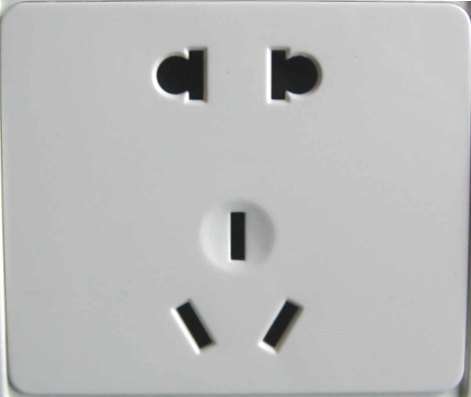
Typical modern socket in China. As well as accepting 3-pin Chinese sockets, it also accepts 2-pin NEMA and Europlug plugs above it.

The Chinese CPCS-CCC (Chinese 10 A/250 V) plugs and socket-outlets are almost identical, differing by only 1 mm (0.039 in) longer pins and installed "upside down". These are the standard in Mainland China. AS 3112 plugs will physically connect with Chinese sockets, although they may not be electrically compatible to the Chinese 220 V standards. The reverse case is not true as Chinese plugs usually cannot fit AS 3112 sockets due to its thinner and shorter prongs causing it to fall out.

Originally there was no convention as to the direction of the earth pin. Often it was facing upwards, as socket-outlets in China now do but it could also be downwards or horizontal, in either direction.

There are also 16 A and 20 A variants with bigger pins. These plugs are different from the Australian 15 A and 20 A plugs. In parallel, the GB 1002 standard also defines the Type A or NEMA-1 connector (for non-earthed appliances up to 10 amps).

=== Argentine IRAM 2073 ===
The Argentinian plugs and socket-outlets are also identical to the Australian AS 3112, but the polarity is reversed and the pins are one millimetre longer. The plugs are also used in some places in Uruguay albeit less common than Type L and Schuko.
