= Harvey Hubbell =

American inventor and industrialist

Harvey Hubbell II
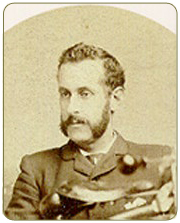
- Harvey Hubbell II
- Born: 1857; Connecticut, United States
- Died: December 17, 1927 (aged 69–70)
- Scientific career
- Fields: Electrical engineering
- Workplaces: Harvey Hubbell, Incorporated

Harvey Hubbell II (1857–1927) was an American inventor, entrepreneur, and industrialist. His best-known inventions are the U.S. electrical plug and the pull-chain light socket.

Hubbell was born in 1857, in Connecticut, United States. In 1888, at the age of 31, Hubbell quit his job as a manager of a manufacturing company and founded Hubbell Incorporated in Bridgeport, Connecticut, a company which is still in business today, still headquartered near Bridgeport. Hubbell began manufacturing consumer products and, by necessity, inventing manufacturing equipment for his factory. Some of the equipment he designed included automatic tapping machines and progressive dies for blanking and stamping. One of his most important industrial inventions, still in use today, is the thread rolling machine. He quickly began selling his newly devised manufacturing equipment alongside his commercial products.

Hubbell received at least 45 patents, most of which were for electric products. The pull-chain electrical light socket was patented in 1896, and his most famous invention, the U.S. electrical power plug, in 1904. It allowed the adoption in the U.S. of convenient, portable electrical devices, which Great Britain had enjoyed since the early 1880s. In 1916, Hubbell was also granted a patent for a three-bladed power plug, including a ground prong, which Australian regulators and electrical accessory manufacturers adopted as the standard for that country in the 1930s. It was also adopted in New Zealand, Argentina, and (with a minor variation) in China.

== See also ==
- History of AC power plugs and sockets § Hubbell's inventions
