= History of AC power plugs and sockets =

Approximately 20 types of AC power plugs and sockets are in common use around the world, and many obsolete socket types are still found in older buildings.

== Development ==
=== Early history ===
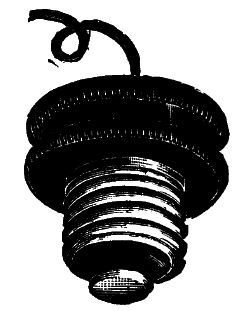
Lampholder plug from 1893 GEC Ltd (London) catalogue

When electricity was first introduced into houses in the 1880s, it was primarily used for lighting. One common approach for other appliances (such as vacuum cleaners, electric fans, smoothing irons and curling tong heaters) was to connect to light bulb sockets using lampholder plugs. However, in Britain, there were recognisable two pin plugs and wall sockets appearing on the market as early as 1885.

==== British origins ====
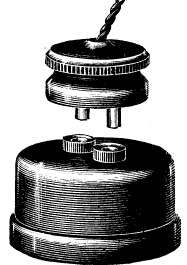
Early GEC 2 pin plug and socket as depicted in the 1893 GEC Catalogue

As electricity became a common method of operating labour-saving appliances, a safe means of connection to the electric system other than using a light socket was needed. Thomas Tayler Smith, of London, received British patent 4162 in 1882 for an "Electric-Circuit Connection" to "enable the electric conductors conveying the current to one or more lamps, or along a flexible cord, to be rapidly and safely brought into connection with the line or main wires". Smith subsequently received U.S. patent 311,616 for the same device in 1885. According to British Author John Mellanby there were British patents for plug and sockets granted to T.T. Smith in 1883 (No. 3883) and W. B. Sayers & G. Hookham in 1884, (No. 16655). Mellanby also writes that there were two-pin designs by 1885, one of which appears in the General Electric Company catalogue of 1889.

Gustav Binswanger, a German immigrant who founded the General Electric Company, obtained a patent (GB189516898) in 1895 for a plug and socket using a concentric (co-axial) contact system.

==== Hubbell's inventions ====
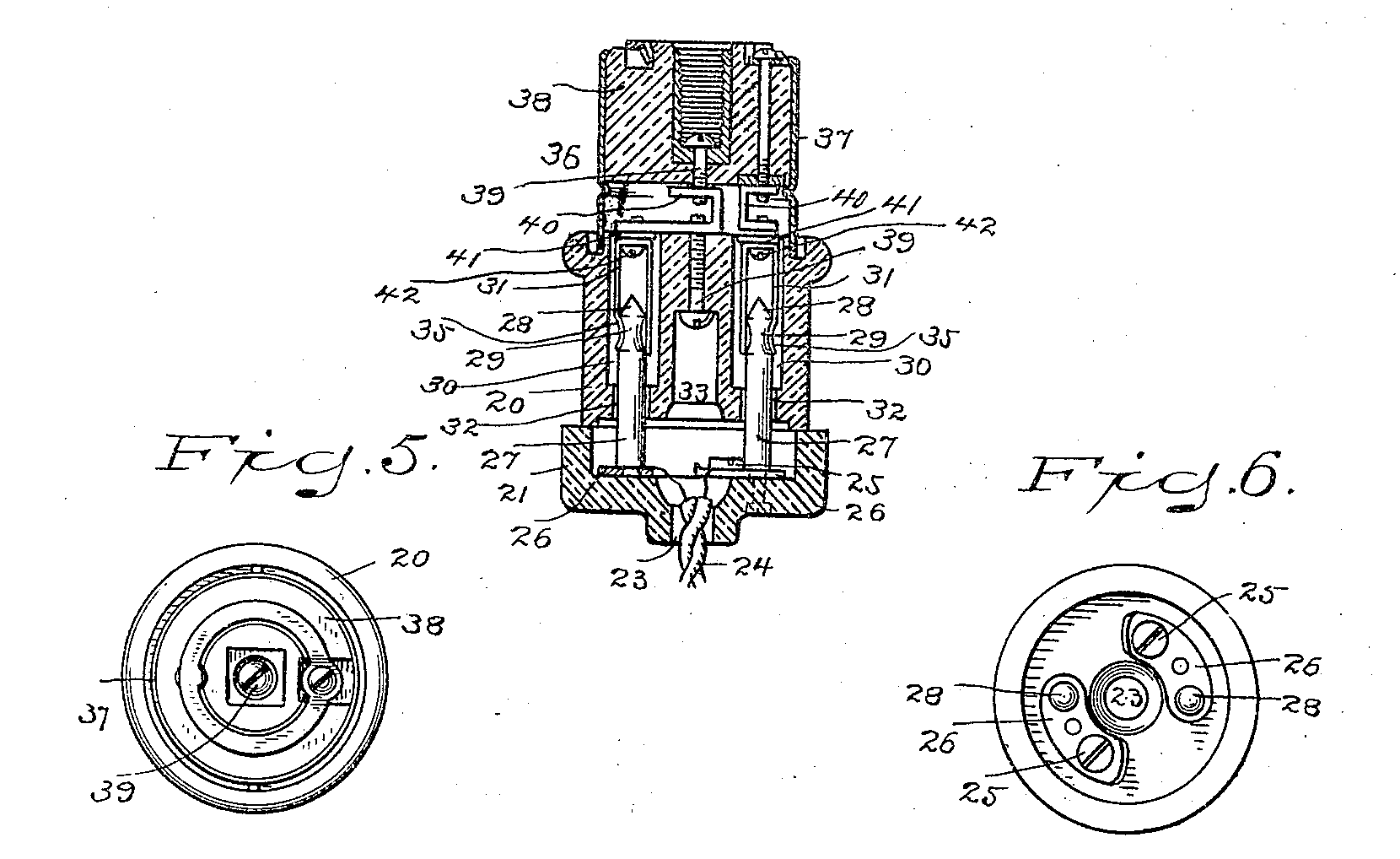
U.S. patent 774,250. The first US power plug and socket dated 1904

Several early American electrical plug and socket arrangements were invented by Harvey Hubbell. On 26 February 1903 he filed two patent applications featuring 2-pin plugs and adaptors for using his plugs with existing designs of lamp sockets and wall receptacles. Hubbell's first plug design had two round pins which differed from those already in use in Europe in that the tips of the pins had annular detents similar to those of present-day jack plugs to positively retain a plug in its socket. In one patent, U.S. patent 774,250 a plug was used with a socket which screwed into a lampholder (like the early lampholder plugs). In the other patent U.S. patent 776,326 the same type of plug was used with various three-way adaptors that could be connected to lampholders or "a receptacle of any ordinary type". Figures 2 and 4 of this patent show an adaptor plugged into what appears to be a "Chapman" receptacle.

Hubbell evidently soon found the round pin design unsatisfactory as a subsequent U.S. patent 774,251 filed on May 27, 1904 shows lampholder adaptors similar to those of his first patent for use with plugs having coplanar (tandem) flat pins.

Hubbell's catalogue of 1906 includes various three-way adaptors similar to those shown in the US 776,326 patent, but modified for use with the coplanar flat pin plugs. The Chapman receptacle must have been in general use at the time, as it was the only type of non-lampholder receptacle for which adaptors were supplied. The 1906 catalogue says of the Chapman adaptor: "The device avoids fastening the cords together as is necessary with the ordinary Chapman plug when used for more than one purpose." This suggests that Hubbell's original invention was prompted by his observation of the problem that arose with the use of this sort of receptacle and plug. Gradually wall sockets were developed to supplement those that screwed into lampholders.

In 1912 Hubbell rotated his tandem pins by 90 degrees to arrive at the parallel flat pin configuration still widely used today (NEMA 1-15).

A feature common to all of Hubbell's patented designs is the provision of detents to retain a plug in its socket. This would have been a desirable feature in the days before wall receptacles became widespread and, for many consumers, the only source of electricity was an electric light socket.

==== Hubbell versus other American manufacturers ====
Despite Hubbell's objections, other manufacturers adopted the Hubbell pattern (omitting Hubbell's detents as these did not affect interchangeability) and by 1915 the use of Hubbell's configuration was widespread. In 1919 Hubbell unsuccessfully attempted to get an injunction to prevent other manufacturers from making receptacles and plugs to the dimensions used by Hubbell.

The report of the court proceedings includes a comprehensive review of the development of the art in the US prior to 1919, based on evidence presented to the Court. Separable plugs had been available for more than a decade prior to Hubbell's 1904 design.

The earliest presented to the court was the "Weston" (U.S. patent 480,900 issued August 16, 1892, for which Hubbell had taken out a licence), another (unidentified) type following in 1897. Plugs per se with parallel flat pins, such as the "Fort Wayne" design were in common use by 1886, and flush receptacles, such as the "Bryant Electrical Company" design, by 1902. Hubbell had introduced its own parallel flat pin configuration in 1912. In 1915 there were ...from 15 to 20 different types of blades and from 15 to 30 different types of receptacles. The line of each was not interchangeable with competing lines. .... The existence of both "tandem" and parallel pin configurations had led to the introduction in 1914 of some receptacles having both configurations of slots and others having "T" slots.

By 1915, Hubbell had sold about 13 million receptacles and plug bases/caps with tandem slots/pins, and about 1.25 million with parallel slots/pins, most of which were then still in active use, meaning that Hubbell's configurations were by far the most widely used.

Following the lead set by the lamp manufacturers in standardising lamp bases, a conference of the plug and receptacle manufacturers, including Hubbell, was arranged with a view of agreeing a standard configuration. It was a time of great expansion in the use of electrical appliances such as fans, heaters, and cookers, as well as portable devices such as hair curlers and irons, and the public wanted interchangeability. Hubbell's parallel pin configuration was preferred, but Hubbell resisted standardization, asserting that he had common law rights in the dimensions of his line. The other conference members pressed on regardless, and agreed to standardize on Hubbell's parallel flat pin configuration and dimensions. Hubbell's failed court action only served to confirm the legality of their activities.

==== Earthed (grounded) plugs ====
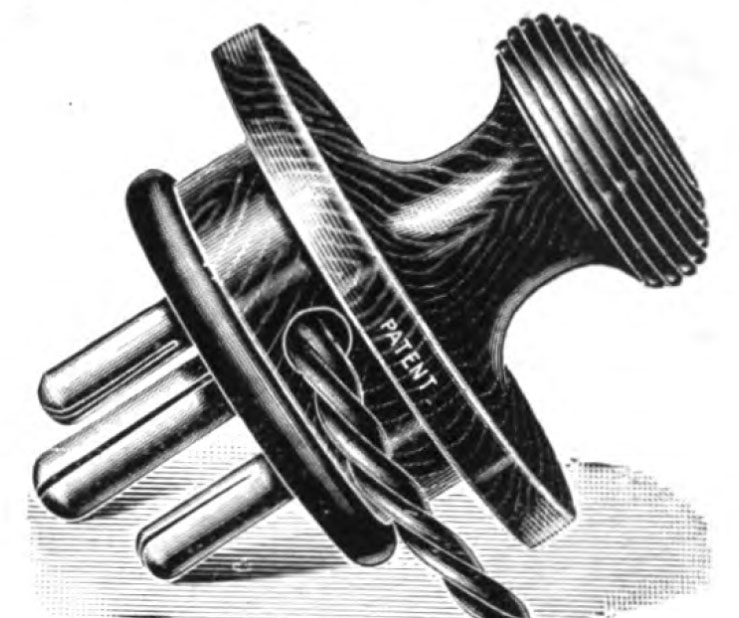
Illustration of "Tripin" 3-pin earthed plug dated 1911.

The earthed (grounded) consumer plug has several claimants to its invention.

In Britain, a 1911 book dealing with the electrical products of A. P. Lundberg & Sons of London describes the "Tripin" earthed plug available in 2.5 amp and 5 amp models. The pin configuration of the "Tripin" appears virtually identical to modern BS 546 plugs. In her 1914 book Electric cooking, heating, cleaning, etc. Maud Lucas Lancaster mentions an earthed iron-clad plug and socket by the English firm of Reyrolle and Co.

The earliest American patent application for an earthed plug appears to be 11 January 1915 by George P. Knapp, on behalf of the Harvey Hubbell company. U.S. patent 1,179,728 covers the use of an earthing pin which extends further than the other two contacts to ensure that it is engaged first. Knapp's design was obsoleted in the U.S. before the modern NEMA designations, but is still used in some other countries including China, Argentina and Australia. The configuration of the socket was not operable with existing two-contact unearthed plugs. Other earthed sockets that are widely used in the U.S. today are operable with unearthed plugs. It is sometimes claimed (e.g., in Illumin) that the modern American version of the earthed plug, was invented by Philip F. Labre who was issued a U.S. patent 1,672,067 for an earthed socket and plug in 1928. However, Labre's design is no more similar to the modern version than Knapp's earlier design.

The German Schuko-system plug is believed to date from 1925 and is attributed to Albert Büttner. As the need for safer installations became apparent, earthed three-contact systems were made mandatory in most industrial countries.

=== Proliferation ===
During the first 50 years of commercial use of electric power, standards developed rapidly based on growing experience. Technical, safety, and economic factors influenced the development of all wiring devices and numerous varieties were invented. After the two-prong electric plug was introduced in the 1920s, the three-pin outlet was developed. This format was introduced in order to mitigate the effect of a short circuit event, as the supply would be neutralised with earth. Gradually the desire for trade eliminated some standards that had been used in only a few countries. Former colonies may retain the standards of the colonising country. Sometimes offshore industrial plants or overseas military bases use the wiring practices of their controlling country instead of the surrounding region. Some countries have multiple voltages, frequencies and plug designs in use, which can create inconvenience and safety hazards. Hotels and airports may maintain sockets of foreign standards for the convenience of travellers. By 2018, there were 15 plug and socket types around the world.

=== Consolidation ===
De facto standards became formalised as official national and international standards. The earliest is believed to be British Standard 73 Wall plugs and sockets (five ampere two-pin without earthing connection) which was first published in 1915. The International Electrotechnical Commission in 1934 established technical committee TC 23 for electrical fittings. Only two meetings were held before the outbreak of the Second World War. In mainland Europe, since 1951 the International Commission on the Rules for the Approval of Electrical Equipment (CEE) has published a standard (CEE 7 Specification for Plugs and Socket-Outlets for Domestic and Similar Purposes) describing the plugs and sockets used. In 1953 the CEE published Technical Report 83 (later 60083), which was a listing of plugs and sockets then in use. In North America the National Electrical Manufacturers Association (NEMA) publishes standards for plugs and sockets.

The international standard IEC 60884-1 defines the general requirements for plugs and sockets intended for household and similar purposes, IEC 60884-1 does not define specific plug and socket types, which are the subject of national standards in each country. IEC 60884-1 para 9.2 does stipulate that "it shall not be possible, within a given system, to engage a plug with a socket-outlet having a higher voltage rating or a lower current rating". IEC 60884-1 para 6.1 defines the preferred voltage ratings for single phase plugs and sockets as 130 V or 250 V. The foreword of IEC 60884-1 states: in order to promote international uniformity, IEC National Committees undertake to apply IEC Publications transparently to the maximum extent possible in their national and regional publications. Any divergence between any IEC Publication and the corresponding national or regional publication shall be clearly indicated in the latter.

Consolidation of standards eases international trade and travel. For example, the CEE 7/7 plug has been adopted in several European countries and is compatible with both CEE 7/3 and CEE 7/5 sockets, while the unearthed and unpolarised CEE 7/16 Europlug is compatible with even more European and other socket types. In response to a suggestion that the European Commission introduce a common system across the whole of the European Union, the Commission's Regulatory Fitness and Performance (REFIT) programme issued a report in 2017. The report found that "the harmonisation of plug and socket outlet systems in Europe, by introducing changes in national wiring legislations (would have) important transitional periods (above 75 years)", and that the cost to "replace the old socket-outlets (and the corresponding plugs of the appliances being used)" was estimated at 100 billion Euro, "generating a huge environmental impact, producing some 700 000 tons of electrical waste". The report does not recommend harmonising the plugs and socket-outlet systems in Europe.

IEC 60906-1 was originally published in 1986 as a common standard for plugs and sockets in countries using 230 V, "that could be accepted by many countries as their national standard, now or in the near future". A modified version is used in Brazil, but IEC 60906-1 has been adopted only in South Africa (in 1993), becoming the "preferred configuration for new installations" in 2013. A statement released by the South African Bureau of Standards in 2016 said that the roll-out of the new standard would be gradual and that the implementation of a new standard could take "[up to] 50 years".

IEC 60906-2 is based on the NEMA 5-15 and NEMA 5-20 plug and socket systems and was originally published in 1992.

The object of this part of IEC 60906 is to provide a standard for a safe, compact and practical IEC 125 V system of plugs and socket-outlets that could be accepted by many countries as their national standard, now or in the near future. It is therefore recommended that any country in need of a new or replacement system for the nominal voltage range 100 V to 130 V a.c. adopt this standard as its only national standard.

== Obsolete types ==
=== Old Spanish sockets ===
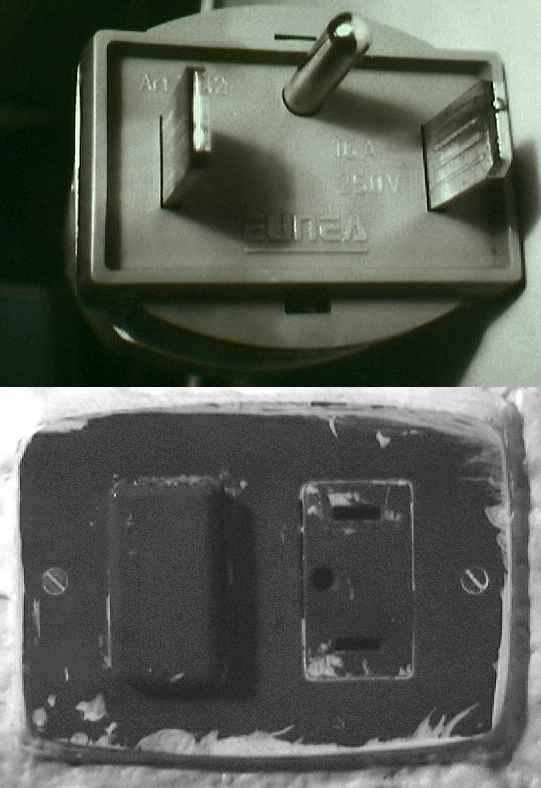
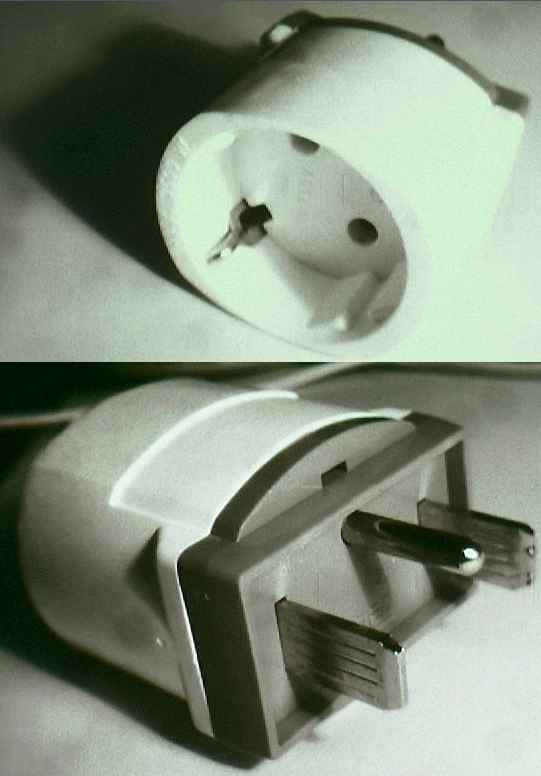
Left: Spanish three-pin plug (Eunea 3023-B/Metropoli) and socket (Eunea 3013-B) with removable fuse.
Right: adaptor for CEE 7/17 and CEE 7/4 plugs.

Some older industrial buildings in Spain used sockets that took a plug rated for higher current and had two flat contacts and a round earth pin, somewhat similar in design to the ones found on American plugs but larger in size. The two flat contacts are spaced further apart than on an American plug. No domestic appliances were ever sold with these plugs.

The line and neutral measure 9 by 2 mm (0.354 by 0.079 in), and are 30 mm (1.181 in) apart. All three pins are 19 mm (0.748 in) long, and the earth pin is a cylinder of 4.8 mm (0.189 in) diameter.

=== Original American Hubbell plug and receptacle ===
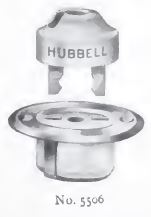
Hubbell plug and receptacle as advertised in the 1906 Hubbell catalog

An early American electrical plug and socket was invented by Harvey Hubbell and patented in 1904. Hubbell's first design was a socket which screwed into a lampholder (like the early lampholder plugs), but with a separable plug with pins (U.S. patent 774,250) or blades (US patent 774251). The 1906 Hubbell catalog shows the blade plug with a flush mounting socket for use in wall or floor. Other manufacturers adopted the Hubbell pattern, and by 1915 they were widespread.

=== American 125 V, 15 A / 250 V, 10 A "Australian" style ===
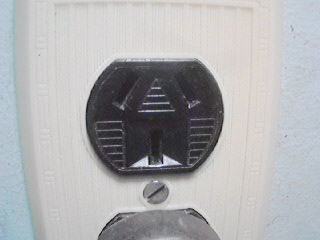
Obsolete 125 V, 15 A / 250 V, 10 A duplex outlet

A patent for the obsolete "wye" American plug and socket was filed in 1915 under U.S. patent 1,179,728. It predated the NEMA sockets and plugs. The plugs and sockets used in countries such as Argentina, Australia and China are based on this type and are physically compatible.

=== Split current/voltage ratings ===
Many older North American sockets have two different current and voltage ratings, most commonly 10 A 250 V/15 A 125 V. This has to do with a peculiarity of the National Electrical Code from 1923 to the 1950s. Originally, sockets were rated at 10 A 250 V, because the NEC limited lighting circuits to 10 A. In 1923, the code changed to allow lighting circuits to be fused at 15 A, but the previous 10 A rule still applied to circuits over 125 V. The higher voltages were rarely used for lighting and appliances. Most sockets with this rating are of the "T-slot" type.

=== US perpendicular socket ===
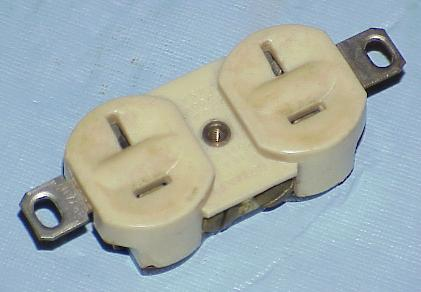
Perpendicular slot duplex socket

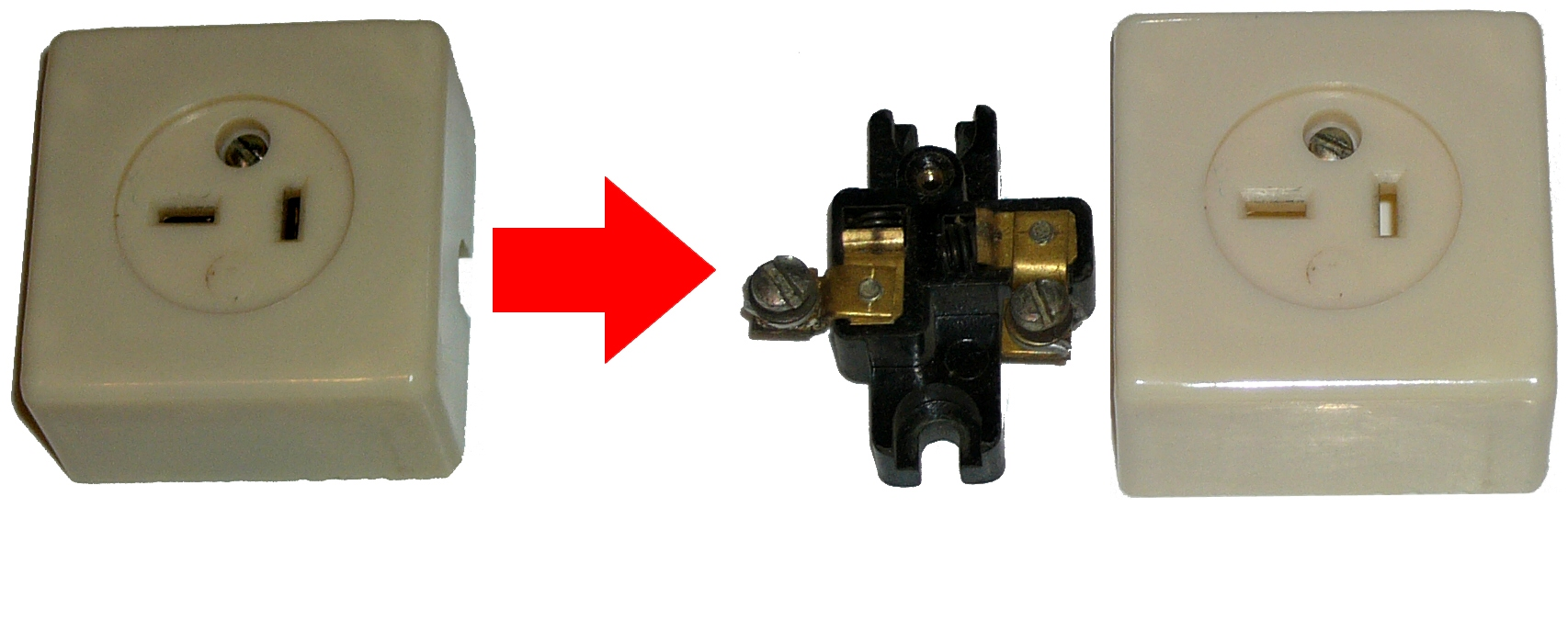
Perpendicular slot RP-2B socket 10 A 42 V AC

Another obsolete socket, made by Bryant, 125 V 15 A and 250 V 10 A rating. A NEMA 5‐20 125 V 20 A or 6‐20 250 V 20 A plug with a missing earth pin would fit this socket, but a NEMA 2‐20 plug is slightly too big to fit.

The upper slots connect to silver-coloured wiring screws on the upper side, and the lower slots connect to brass-coloured wiring screws on the lower side.

In Australia, the same or similar T-configuration sockets are used for DC power sockets, such as in stand-alone power systems (SAPS), on boats and in police vehicles. Polarity is inconsistent.

In the former Soviet Union this socket was and still is commonly used for wiring in places where the voltage is lowered for safety purposes, like in schools, filling stations or in wet areas, and is rated 42 V at 10 A AC. Such an unusual connection is intended specifically to make the connection of standard higher-voltage equipment impossible.

=== U.S. combination duplex socket ===
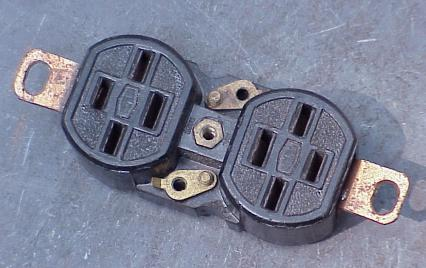
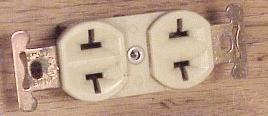
Left: old "Nurpolian"-brand black parallel and tandem duplex socket rated at 250 V 10 A (although normally supplied with 120 V). Right: T-slot duplex socket.

The parallel and tandem socket accepts normal parallel NEMA 1‐15 plugs and also tandem NEMA 2‐15 plugs. Both pairs of sockets are fed internally by the same supply.

A more recent and fairly common version of this type is the T-slot socket, in which the locations of the tandem and the parallel slots were combined to create T-shaped slots. This version also accepts normal parallel NEMA 1‐15 plugs and also tandem NEMA 2‐15 plugs. Incidentally, a NEMA 5‐20, NEMA 6-15, or NEMA 6‐20 plug with a missing earth pin would fit this socket. This receptacle type has been unavailable at retail since the 1960s but still available from the manufacturer Leviton (model 5000-I) for replacement only, not for new installations and is not "UL listed".

Harvey Hubbell had patented the parallel blade plug in 1913, and patented a polarized version in 1916. He also patented the T-slot single outlet in 1915, and a duplex T-slot outlet in 1916 both meant to take his older 1904 tandem and newer parallel plug design. (Single: U.S. patent 1,146,938; Duplex: U.S. patent 1,210,176). Prior to the 1930s, when Hubbell's parallel blade plug received its official rating of 125v (and became the United States' general service electrical plug standard), all of his electrical connectors were used interchangeably on either 120 V or 240 V. The two blade tandem configuration plug received its official rating of 250 V in the 1950s but has been "banned" from use since the 1960s because of its lack of a ground or neutral.

Note: See the NEMA 1-15 ungrounded (Type A) section of this page for the parallel blade patent reference numbers.

=== U.S. adapters ===
These adaptors are obsolete because they are not polarized; polarized versions of these types are still available in the U.S.

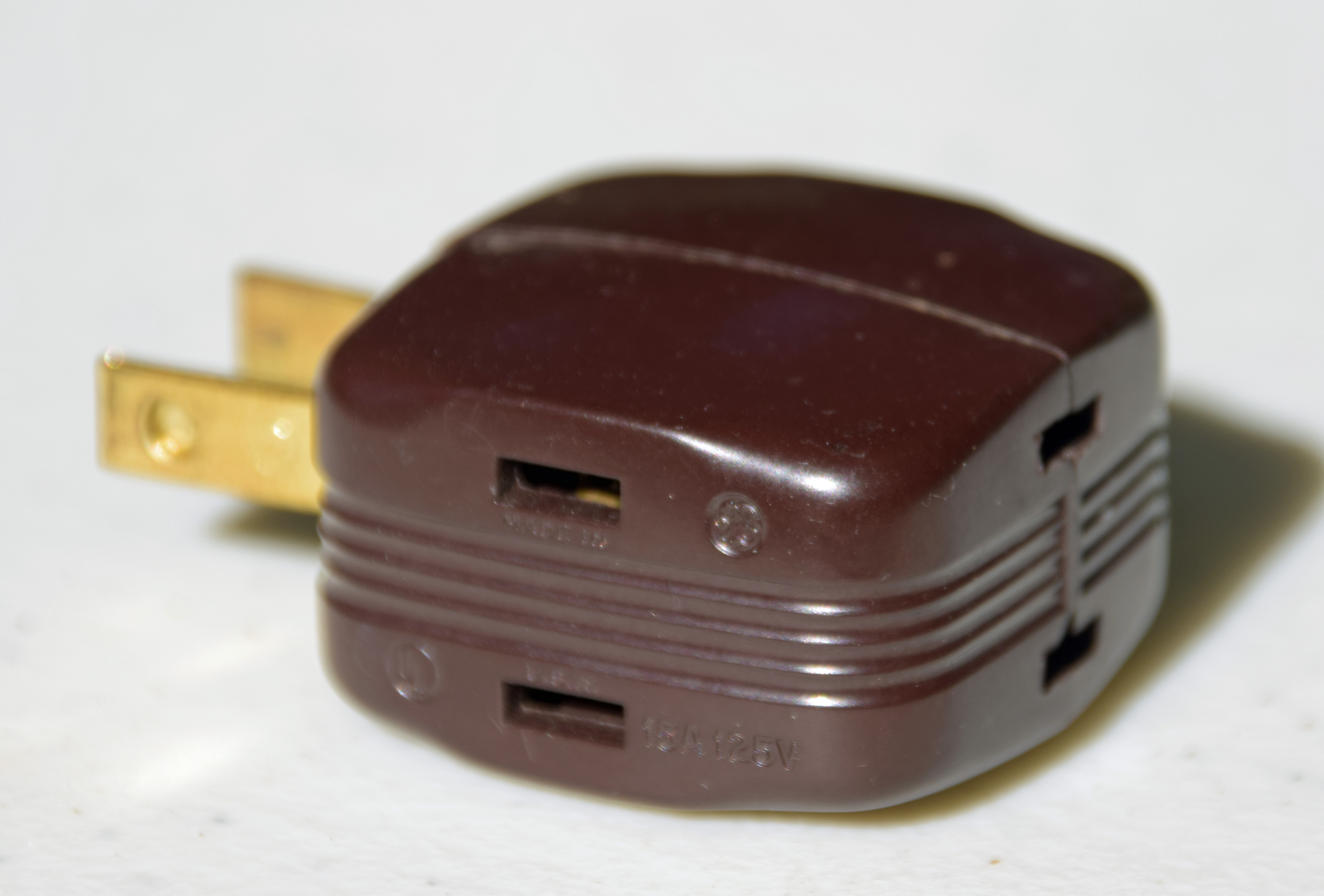
One-to-three plug electrical converter, by General Electric

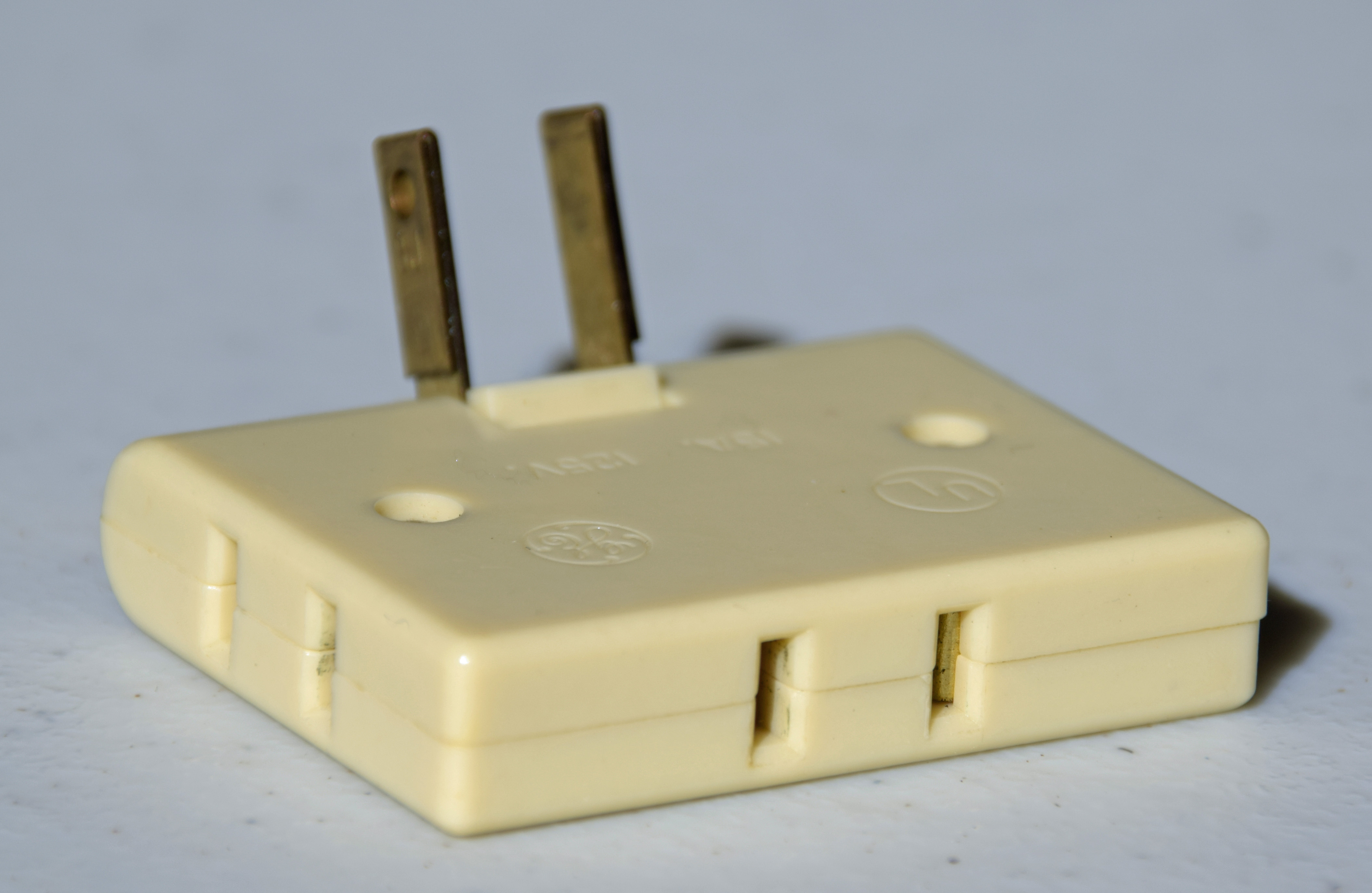
One-to-three plug electrical converter, by General Electric. The plug rotates 180 degrees.

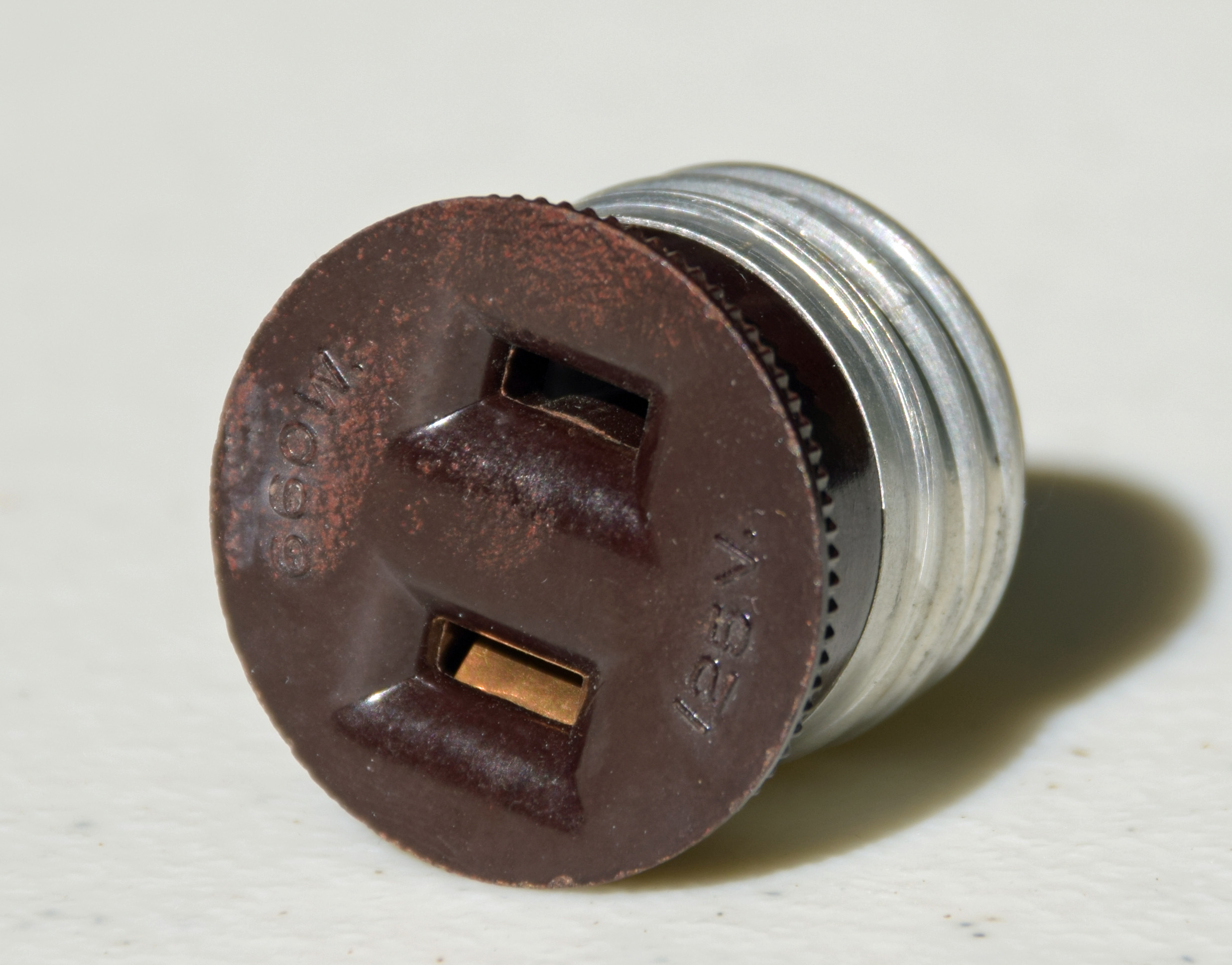
Converts a light bulb socket into an electrical receptacle

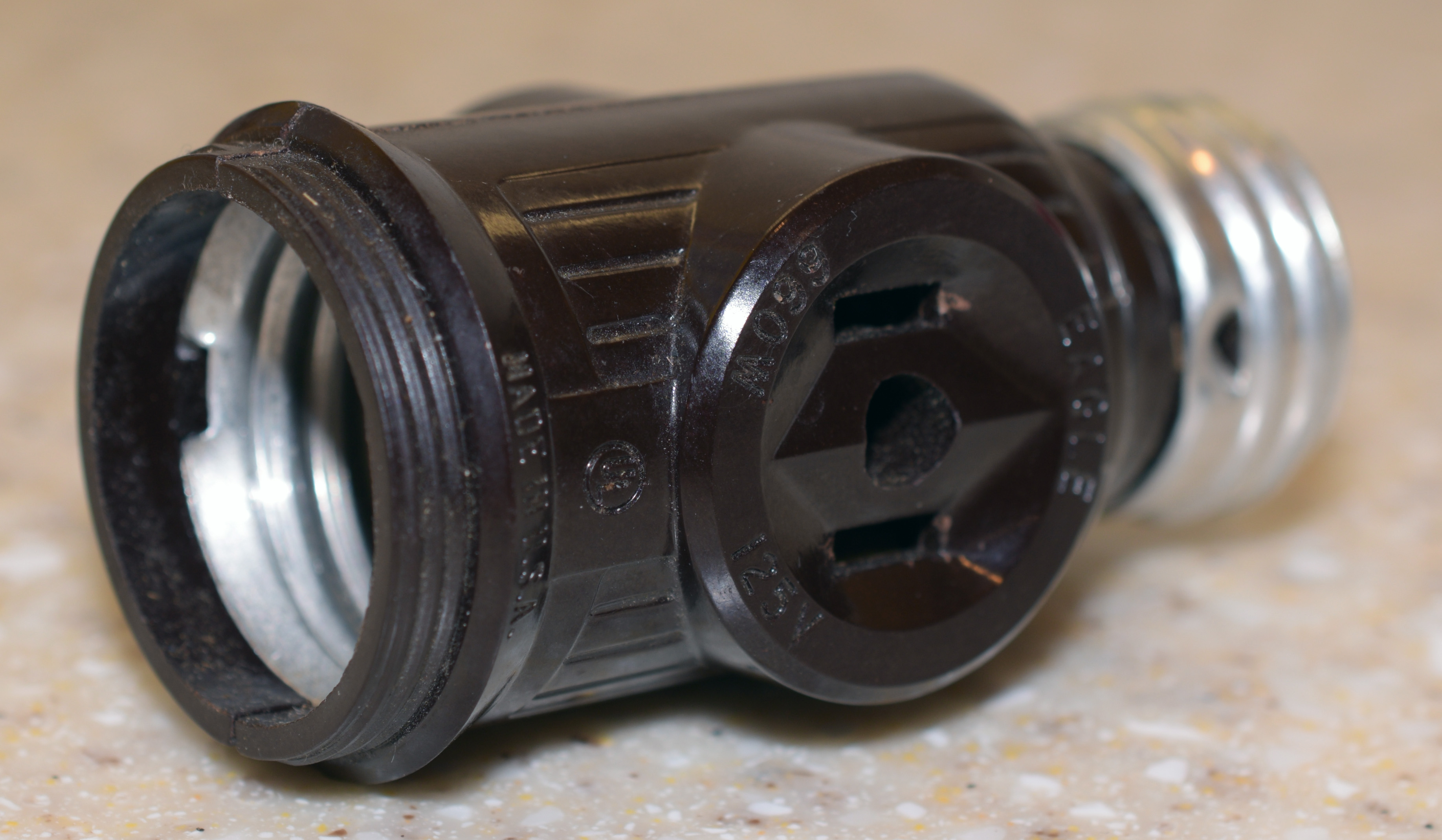
Screws into a light bulb socket to add two receptacles, while still taking the bulb. Made in the US by Eagle Electric.

=== UK obsolete types ===
Before the 1970s, several types of proprietary plugs and sockets were commonly used in Britain, alongside types which conformed to national standards.

=== Old Greek sockets ===
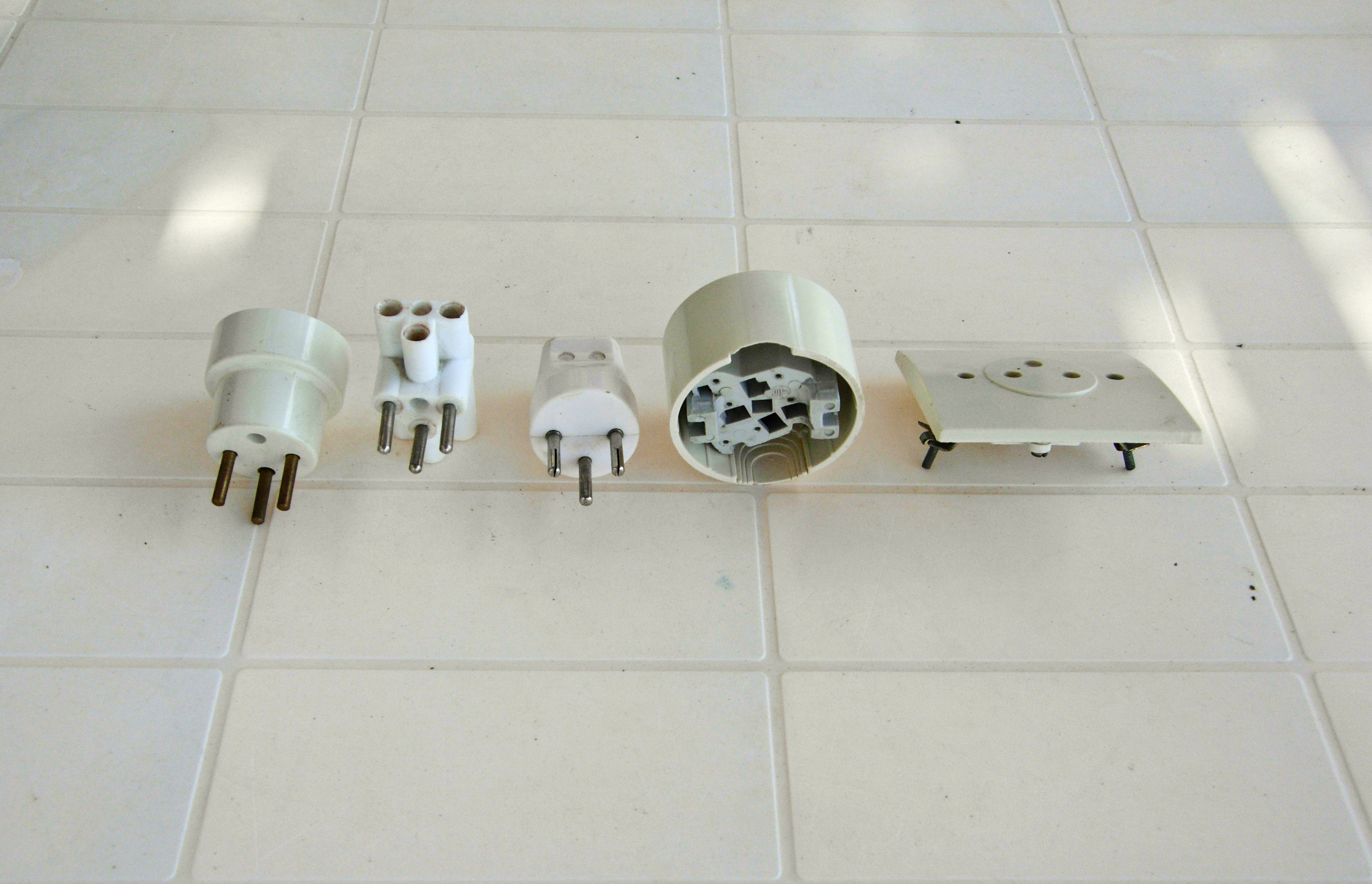
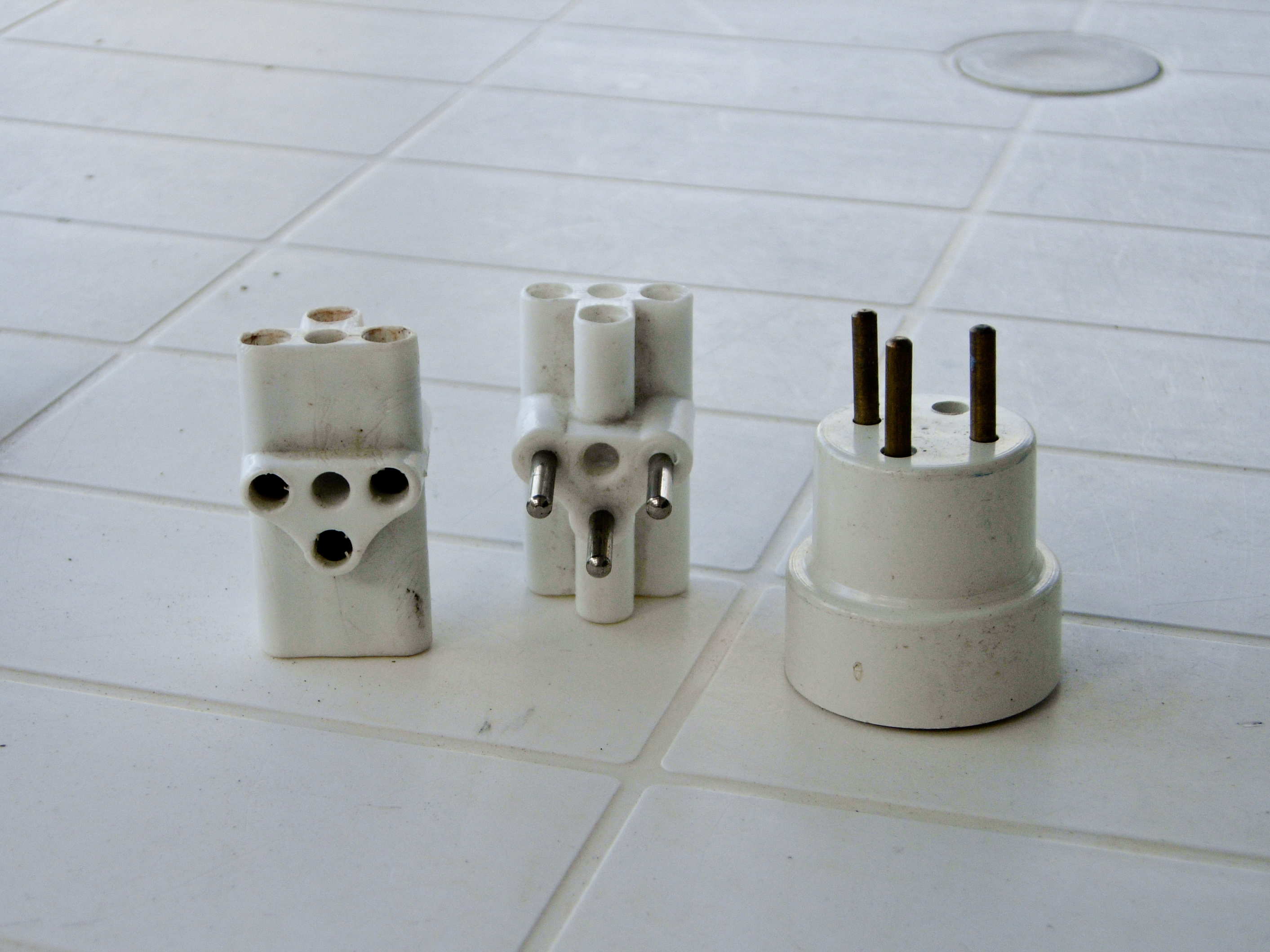
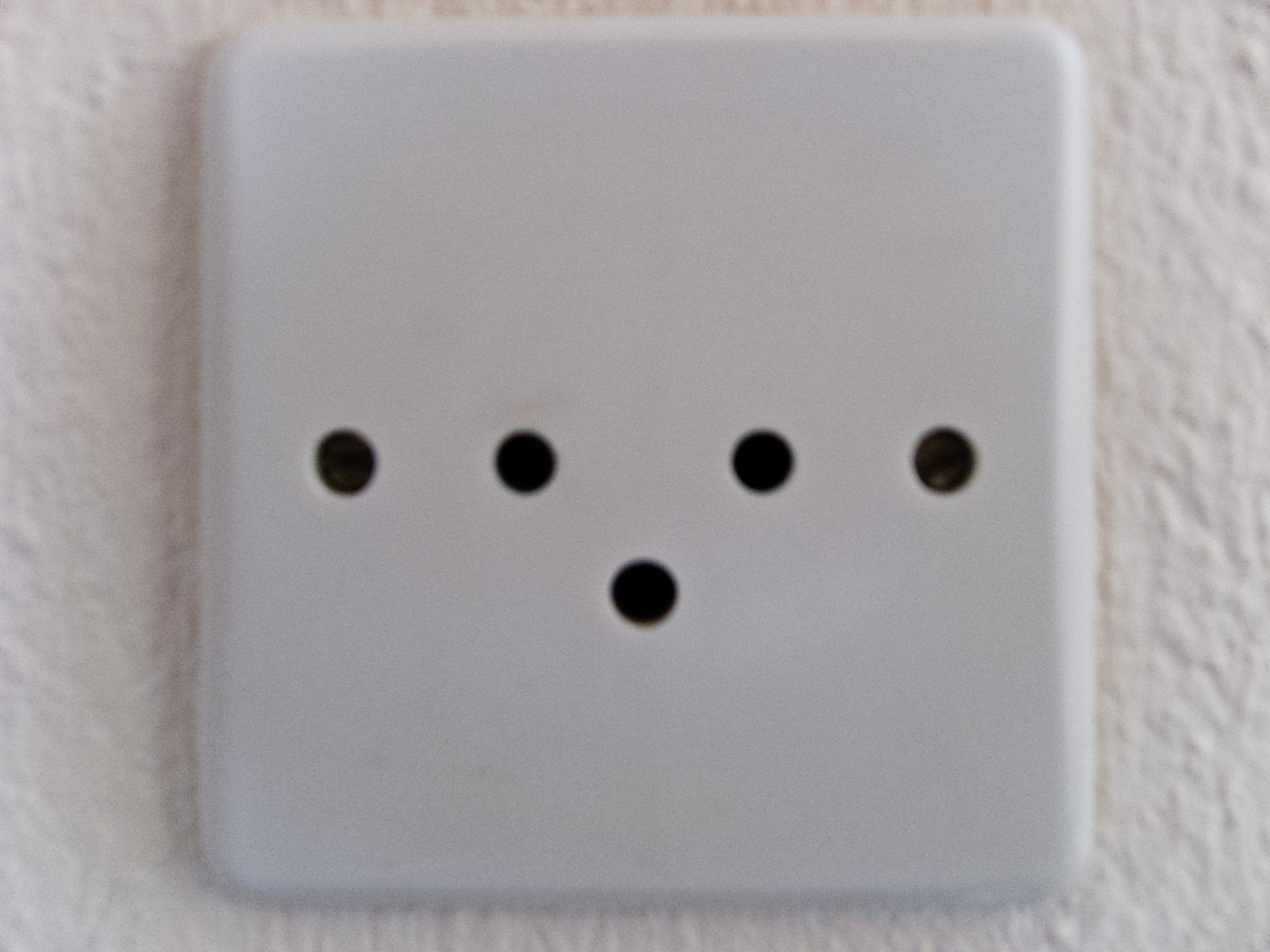
Greek old earthed standard adaptor plugs and socket

Called "Tripoliki" (τριπολική, meaning "three-pole"), the standard had 3 round pins, similar to the post-1989 Israeli SI 32 and Thai TIS 166-2549 types. The Tripoliki was virtually abandoned by the 1980s, but can still be found in unrenovated houses constructed before 1980. Previous to the large-scale adoption of Schuko plugs, this was the only way to use an earthed appliance in Greece. It can accept Europlugs, and also (but with no earth connection possible) French and German types.

== See also ==
- AC power plugs and sockets
- DC connector
- IEC 60309 high-power industrial and polyphase connectors
- IEC 60320 appliance connectors
- Industrial and multiphase power plugs and sockets
- Mains electricity
- Mains electricity by country lists voltage, frequency, and connector types for over 200 countries
- Perilex
- Plug load
- Polyphase system
- Smart plug
- Stage pin connector
- Anderson Powerpole
