= C (disambiguation) =

C is the third letter in the Latin alphabet.

C or c may also refer to:

== STEM ==
=== Technology ===
==== Computing ====
- C (programming language), developed at Bell Labs in 1972
- C, the digit with value 12 (number) in hexadecimal
- C:, or "Drive C", the default drive letter assignment for the default hard drive in DOS and Windows

==== Electronics ====
- C battery, a size of battery
- "C" battery, vacuum tube battery used to provide bias to the control grid
- Battery charger § C-rate
- Capacitor or C

=== Measurement ===
- °C, Celsius temperature scale
- c, carat (purity)
- c, centi-, an SI prefix
- C, Coulomb, the SI derived unit for electric charge

=== Science ===
- c (IPA), the notation for the voiceless palatal stop in the International Phonetic Alphabet

==== Medicine ====
- ATC code C or cardiovascular system, a section of the Anatomical Therapeutic Chemical Classification System
- Haplogroup C (mtDNA), a human mitochondrial DNA (mtDNA) haplogroup
- Haplogroup C-M130 (Y-DNA), a Y-chromosomal DNA (Y-DNA) haplogroup once called simply C
- C-value, DNA contained within a haploid nucleus

==== Biochemistry ====
- Troponin C, one of the three troponins
- Cytosine, nucleic acid
- C (or Cys), an abbreviation for the amino acid cysteine

==== Materials science ====
- Carbon, symbol C, a chemical element
  - Atomic carbon, chemical formula C
- c, the specific heat capacity of a substance
- C, capacitance

==== Physics ====
- c, charm quark
- c, the speed of sound
- c, the speed of light in vacuum

==== Astronomy ====
- C, a prefix for astronomical star clusters, which follow the IAU's "Chhmm±ddd" format
- C, a prefix for astronomical objects listed in the Caldwell catalogue, ranging from C1 to C109

=== Mathematics ===
- c, any constant
- C, the constant of integration
- C, the digit meaning 12 (number) in positional numeral systems with a radix of 13 or greater
- C, in Roman numerals, the symbol for 100
- C or $\mathbb{C}$, the set of all complex numbers
- ℭ or $\mathfrak c$, the cardinality of the continuum
- C, the set of continuous functions
- C, the combination or "choose" function
- c space, the space of all convergent sequences in functional analysis

== Arts and media ==
- C (TV series), Control: The Money and Soul of Possibility, an anime show created by Tatsunoko Production, broadcast on Fuji TV in 2011
- C (plastic toy), Czech: céčko (plural: céčka), from Czechoslovakia, initially used as buckles and in door hangings
- C, the production code of The Edge of Destruction (AKA Inside the Spaceship), the third Doctor Who serial, broadcast 1964
- C, pseudonym for the character Max Denbigh in the 2015 film Spectre

=== Music ===
- C (musical note), and keys based on it:
  - C major
  - C minor
- C Album, 1999 album by Kinki Kids
- C (Miho Nakayama album), stylized as 「C」, 1985
- "C" (song), stylized as "「C」", 1985 single by Miho Nakayama
- C (Lucy Bedroque album), 2026
- , symbol used to designate common time
- , symbol used to designate alla breve
- "C", one of Deux Poèmes de Louis Aragon by Francis Poulenc
- "C" (Deltarune), a 2025 track by Toby Fox from Deltarune Chapters 3+4 OST from the video game Deltarune
- c, alternative name for Grimes

=== Literature ===
- Prefix "c", to specify a column number as in-source-locator in old citations
- C (novel), a novel by Tom McCarthy
- C, a 1924 novel by Maurice Baring
- C Magazine, a magazine published by Cardinal Courier Media
- "C" Is for Corpse, the third novel in Sue Grafton's "Alphabet mystery" series, published in 1986
- C-lehti ('C-magazine'), a defunct Finnish computer magazine
- Codex Ephraemi Rescriptus
- C (journal), a natural sciences academic periodical published by MDPI

== Transportation ==
- Line C (disambiguation) including "C line"; used in several public transport systems
- Mercedes-Benz C-class
- C, the unofficial designation used by the U.S. Navy classification for Protected Cruisers and Peace Cruisers before the 1920 reclassification
- Farmall C, a tractor produced by International Harvester from 1948 to 1951

=== Rail ===
C Train (disambiguation)

- NZR C class (1873) train
- NZR C class (1930) train
- C, or 0-6-0 classification, a type of locomotive with three powered axles
- C (Los Angeles Railway)
- C (S-train) a service on the S-train network in Copenhagen
- C (New York City Subway service)
- C Line (Los Angeles Metro)
- Line C (Buenos Aires Underground)
- Tokyo Metro Chiyoda Line, a subway service operated by the Tokyo Metro, labeled
- Chūō Line (Osaka), a subway service operated by the Osaka Metro, labeled
- RER C, a line in the RER of Paris
- The official West Japan Railway Company service symbol for:
  - Kusatsu Line
  - Sakai Line

== Sport ==
- Captain (ice hockey)
- Catcher, a position in baseball
- Center (disambiguation) § Sports

== Military units ==
- C (Glamorgan Yeomanry) Troop
- C (Kent and Sharpshooters Yeomanry) Squadron
- C (Rhodesia) Squadron 22 SAS

== Other uses ==
- C (grade), a satisfactory grade in education
- Citigroup, Inc.'s stock ticker symbol
- Caius, a Latin name
- Center Party (Sweden), a Swedish political party
- Mansfield Smith-Cumming or C (1859–1923), Chief of the SIS, the UK Secret Intelligence Service, also known as MI6
  - His successors as Chief of the SIS have since been generally known by his alias, C
- Dominical letter C for a common year starting on Friday
- Charlie, the military time zone code for UTC+03:00
- C (restaurant), a restaurant in Tampere, Finland

== See also ==
=== Identically-pronounced words ===
- Cee (disambiguation)
- Sea (disambiguation)
- See (disambiguation)
- Si (disambiguation)

=== Similar-looking characters, variants, and with punctuation ===
- С/с, the letter "es" in the Cyrillic alphabet
- Ϲ, the lunate form of the letter "sigma" in the Greek alphabet
- ⊂, the relation symbol indicating that a set is a subset of another set
- ¢, cents
- C. (disambiguation)
- (C) (disambiguation)
- Ⓒ/ⓒ, circle-c (disambiguation)
- ©, copyright symbol (disambiguation)
- C+ (disambiguation)
- C♯ (disambiguation)

=== With a number or word added ===
- C0–C3 (or higher), collectively C-states, the CPU (processor) power states
- C1–C7, the cervical vertebrae
- C-Note (disambiguation)
- C band (disambiguation)
- C-clamp, a type of fastener
- C class (disambiguation)
- Class C (disambiguation)
- C group (disambiguation)
- Group C (disambiguation)
- C series (disambiguation) including "Series C"
- C-size (disambiguation)
- Control-C, a keyboard control code
- C unit (disambiguation)
- Vitamin C
