= CX =

CX or Cx may refer to:

== Businesses and organizations ==
- Cathay Pacific, a Hong Kong airline (IATA code CX)
- Cemex, a Mexican building materials supply company (New York Stock Exchange symbol "CX")
- Connex Melbourne, a former Australian train operator
- Fuji TV, or CX, a Japanese television network

== Science and technology ==
=== Biology and medicine ===
- Circumflex artery (disambiguation), multiple arteries of the human body
- Phosgene oxime, a chemical warfare agent

=== Computing ===
- An interface in IP Multimedia Subsystems, using the diameter protocol, between Home Subscriber Server and Application Server
- CX register, a general-purpose 16-bit X86 register
- C++/CX (component extensions), a language extension for C++ compilers from Microsoft that enables C++ programmers to write programs for the Windows Runtime (WinRT)

=== Other uses in science and technology ===
- CX (noise reduction), a noise reduction system, most notably used for the analog audio tracks of LaserDiscs
- Cx, an abbreviation for the Building Commissioning process
- Drag coefficient ($c_\mathrm d\, ,$ $c_\mathrm x\,$ or $\!\ c_\mathrm w$)

== Places ==
- Christmas Island ISO 3166-1 alpha-2 code
- .cx, the top-level domain for Christmas Island

== Transportation ==
- Citroën CX, a French executive car
- Honda CX series, a Japanese motorcycle range
- Mitsubishi Concept-cX, a Japanese subcompact SUV concept
- Mazda CX, the prefix for Mazda's crossover and SUV lineup

== Other uses ==
- 110 (number), in Roman numerals
- Cx, a grapheme in Kashmiri Roman Script for ts.
- Chron X, a digital collectible card game
- Cross-examination debate, also known as Policy debate, a form of speech competition
- Customer experience, the experiences a customer has with a supplier of goods or services
- Cyclo-cross, a form of bicycle racing
- Nikon CX format, an image sensor format
- Ĉ, a letter in the Esperanto alphabet
- Cx, a smiling emoticon
- Cx, referencing popular streamer Ice Poseidon

== See also ==
- CXX (disambiguation)
- CCX (disambiguation)
- C+ (disambiguation)
