= CCX =

CCX may mean:

- 210 in roman numerals
- AD 210, the year of the Common Era
- Chicago Climate Exchange, North American greenhouse gas reduction and trading system
- Cisco Compatible EXtensions, a specification for 802.11 wireless LAN chip manufacturers
- Koenigsegg CCX, a sports car
- CCX, the coal mining company that is controlled by the Brazilian conglomerate EBX Group
- CCX, the name given to Core Complex, a building block in AMD's Zen microarchitecture and its successor architectures
- CCX, the Australian Stock Exchange code for City Chic Collective

== See also ==
- CX (disambiguation)
- CXX (disambiguation)
