= 120 =

120 may refer to:

- 120 (number), the natural number following 119 and preceding 121
- AD 120, a year in the 2nd century AD
- 120 BC, a year in the 2nd century BC
- 120 film, a film format for still photography
- 120 (film), a 2008 film
- Route 120 (MBTA), a bus route in Massachusetts
- 120 (New Jersey bus), a New Jersey Transit bus route
- 120 (Kent) Construction Regiment, Royal Engineers
- 120 volts, standard electrical mains voltage in several countries in the Americas
- Lenovo IdeaPad 120, a discontinued brand of notebook computers
- Ching Chung stop (MTR digital station code 120), a Light Rail stop in Tuen Mun, Hong Kong
- 120 Lachesis, a main-belt asteroid
- Škoda 120, a compact sedan

1/20 may refer to:

- January 20 (month-day date notation)

== See also ==
- Unbinilium, a hypothetical chemical element with atomic number 120
- CXX (disambiguation)
