= MeshBox =

MeshBox is an item of computer hardware which is used to provide large scale wireless broadband networks. Manufactured by LocustWorld, the devices are designed to co-operate with other MeshBoxes within range, passing the internet service from one box to the next, over the air, until it reaches the final destination. The coverage area of a mesh is typically measured in square miles or square kilometres.

Originally released as a bootable CD-ROM called MeshAP based on the OpenAP open source software, the system is now implemented as system image which can fit within a small 32MB CompactFlash card. The system functions have expanded beyond creating wireless networks to provide set-top box services, MP3 audio and video streaming, connection to remote windows terminal servers, other PCs, web browsing, connection to peer-to-peer networks, instant messaging and file exchange.

== See also ==
- Wireless mesh network
- Wireless LAN
- Wireless access point
- Wireless community network
- IEEE 802.11
