= C+ =

C+ or C Plus may refer to:

== Computer programming languages ==
- ABCL/c+, a programming language
- ANSI C, a programming language (as opposed to K&R C)
- C with Classes, predecessor to the C++ programming language
- C++, a programming language
- HolyC (programming language), TempleOS programming language formerly known as C+

== Other uses ==
- C Plus, a brand name of the soft drink Sunkist in some places
- C+ (grade), an academic grade
- Canal+ (disambiguation), French company Groupe Canal+ and its subsidiaries all bearing the brand name
- Faster-than-light travel, above the speed of light, c
- C augmented triad, a chord made up of the notes C, E, and G#.

== See also ==
- C (disambiguation)
- CX (disambiguation)
- CXX (disambiguation)
- CC (disambiguation)
