= Cee =

Cee or CEE may refer to:

== Most commonly ==
- Cee, the English spelling of C, third letter of the Latin alphabet

== Organizations ==
- Center for Excellence in Education, US
- Centre for Environment Education, India
- Centre for the Economics of Education, London, England
- Commission internationale de réglementation en vue de l'approbation de l'équipement électrique, now IECEE, an electrical standards body
  - CEE 7 standard AC plugs and sockets
  - CEE 17, now IEC 60309, connector standard
- Communauté économique européenne, French abbreviation for European Economic Community
- Consortium for Energy Efficiency, North America

== Education ==
- Common Entrance Examination, tests used by independent schools in the UK
- Hong Kong Certificate of Education Examination, a standardized examination from 1974 to 2011

== Other uses ==
- Cee, Spain, A Coruña, Galicia
- Central and Eastern Europe
- Conjugated equine estrogens, a medication
- Converged Enhanced Ethernet

== See also ==
- Let's CEE Film Festival, a film festival focused on Central and Eastern European films held in Vienna, Austria, from 2012 to 2018
