= Ramus circumflexus =

Ramus circumflexus can refer to:

- Circumflex branch of left coronary artery (ramus circumflexus arteriae coronariae sinistrae)
- Circumflex fibular artery (ramus circumflexus fibularis arteriae tibialis posterioris)
