= Devicescape =

American developer of wireless networking software

- Type: Private
- Industry: Mobile, Software
- Founded: June 2001 (as Instant802 Networks)
- Headquarters: San Francisco, California
- Key people: David Fraser, CEO; John Gordon, CTO
- Products: Mobile Software
- Website: www.devicescape.com

Devicescape is an American developer of client/server software services for wireless networking connectivity, analytics, and context-awareness. Founded in 2001 as Instant802 Networks, the company was renamed to Devicescape in January 2005. Devicescape is a venture backed private company.

== History ==
Instant802 Networks was founded in 2001 by Eduardo de-Castro and Roy Petruschka in San-Francisco, and Simon Barber had joined as a third founder a few months after company incorporation.

In 2004 the company began development of packaged software products, including security for emerging devices and complete access point packages. The software was used in devices ranging from LCD projectors, televisions and digital video recorders to PDAs and SOHO access points. The company also provided software for the Wi-Fi Alliance test bed.

Dave Fraser joined as CEO in 2004, and in 2005 the company was renamed Devicescape Software. The company continued to develop additional client security products.

In 2006, Devicescape exited the access point business by licensing its Wireless Infrastructure Platform technology to LVL7, which was subsequently sold to Broadcom.

In 2007, Devicescape contributes a new wireless stack to the Linux kernel.

In 2007, Devicescape introduced Connect, a client-server system which allowed embedded devices to automatically authenticate against a large number of public Wi-Fi networks. The company released a variety of consumer applications for PCs and smartphones under the Devicescape Easy Wi-Fi brand. In 2009, Devicescape launched the Easy WiFi Network.

In 2010, Devicescape applied server-based analysis to curate Wi-Fi networks discovered by client applications, so that Wi-Fi networks could be assessed for quality, location, sharing status and other factors. The company referred to this as a "Curated Virtual Network" (CVN) and became a mechanism for offloading traffic from cellular networks. Late in 2010, MetroPCS (now T-Mobile) became the first major publicly-announced customer to use the Devicescape CVN.

From 2011 through 2014, Devicescape announced several additional US mobile operator customers, including US Cellular and Cricket Wireless, as well as some Wi-Fi centric operators such as Republic Wireless. In 2012, Devicescape expanded the CVN into Europe and subsequently announced an agreement with Virgin Media (UK) in 2014.

In March 2016, Devicescape announced Liberty Global as their first major customer in Europe.

In 2017, Devicescape launched Engage, a proximity-based marketing service, with Universal Pictures as one of their customers.

On May 8, 2019, Devicescape was acquired by Pareteum Corporation. In 2022, Pareteum filed for Chapter 11 bankruptcy.

== Products and services ==
Devicescape licenses software and operates its services for service providers, device makers, and application makers. Devicescape provides the following:

- Devicescape Connect (automated hotspot authentication and provisioning system)
- Devicescape Engage (proximity-based user messaging)
- Devicescape Presence (venue-based application awareness)
- Devicescape Security (supplicant with Wi-Fi Protected Setup and CCX, supported by dB Performance)

== See also ==
- Wi-Fi
- Wi-Fi Alliance
- Wi-Fi Protected Access
- Wireless access point
- wpa supplicant
