= Circumflex artery =

Circumflex artery may refer to:

- Anterior humeral circumflex artery
- Circumflex branch of left coronary artery
- Circumflex fibular artery
- Circumflex scapular artery
- Deep circumflex iliac artery
- Lateral circumflex femoral artery
- Medial circumflex femoral artery
- Posterior humeral circumflex artery
- Superficial circumflex iliac artery
