= Group C (disambiguation) =

Group C may refer to:

- Group C, a category of motorsport, introduced by the FIA in 1982 for sports car racing
- Group C (Australia), to either of two sets of regulations for use in Australian touring car racing from 1965 to 1984
- Group C (Nubia), archaeological culture in Nubia (Sudan)
- One of six or eight groups of four teams competing at the FIFA World Cup
  - 2022 FIFA World Cup Group C
  - 2018 FIFA World Cup Group C
  - 2014 FIFA World Cup Group C
  - 2010 FIFA World Cup Group C
  - 2006 FIFA World Cup Group C
  - 2002 FIFA World Cup Group C
  - 1998 FIFA World Cup Group C
  - 1994 FIFA World Cup Group C
  - 1990 FIFA World Cup Group C

== See also ==
- C group (disambiguation)
- Group 3 (disambiguation)
- Group (disambiguation)
- C (disambiguation)
