= C group =

C group or variation, may refer to:

- C-group, in mathematics group theory
- C-Group culture (2400 BCE - 1550 BCE) an archaeological culture of Lower Nubia
- cgroups (control groups) in Linux kernel namespace
- CGroup, a subsidiary of Li & Fung

== See also ==
- Group C (disambiguation)
- Group 3 (disambiguation)
- Group (disambiguation)
- C (disambiguation)
