= C unit =

C-unit, c Unit, CUnit, or, Unit C, may refer to:

- cunit, a unit of lumber, 100 cubic feet of lumber (2.8 m^{3}; 2.8×10^{6} cm^{3}), formerly used by the Forests Commission Victoria in Victoria, Australia
- C-Unit, a student-based support organization for the Colorado Buffaloes men's basketball team at University of Colorado Boulder, Boulder, Colorado, USA
- Bangabandhu Institute of Comparative Literature and Culture (C Unit), Jahangirnagar University, Savar, Dhaka, Bangladesh
- C Unit, a Category C imprisonment facility in a British prison according to prisoner security categories in the United Kingdom
- C Unit, a fictional object class from the 2005 videogame Metal Saga
- Carbody unit, a locomotive engine, which may contain a control cab (cab unit, A-unit), or be a cabless booster locomotive (booster unit, B-unit)
- CUnit (also "C Unit"), a unit testing framework for C code; see List of unit testing frameworks
- Amdahl C-Unit, a IBM System/370 hardware compatible internal unit for channel I/O
- C unit, a carbon unit in a chemical, a subsection of a molecule
- C, the unit for a battery's C-rate

== See also ==
- Cunit, Golden Coast, Baix Penedès, Tarragona, Catalonia, Spain
- Unit (disambiguation)
- C (disambiguation)
