= (C) =

An uppercase (C) (parenthetical C) may refer to:

- Copyright symbol ©
- Classified information in the United States § Confidential
- Joint Electronics Type Designation System § Parenthetical C, indicating NSA-controlled cryptographic/classified items

== See also ==
- Circle-c (disambiguation)
- Copyright symbol (disambiguation)
- C (disambiguation)
