= CXX =

.cxx is a file extension for C++ files.

CXX may also refer to:

- 120 (number) or CXX in Roman Numerals
  - AD 120
  - No. 120 Squadron RAF
  - Sonnet CXX, a sonnet by William Shakespeare
  - Canto CXX, a canto of the epic poem The Cantos by Ezra Pound
- C++, the programming language, alternately rendered as "Cxx"
- CX-X, a cargo plane program that resulted in the Lockheed C-5 Galaxy

== See also ==
- 120 (disambiguation)
- CX (disambiguation)
- CCX (disambiguation)
