= OpenAP =

Linux firmware for wireless access points

OpenAP was a Linux distribution for wireless access points developed by Instant802 Networks. OpenAP is one of the early open-source Linux distributions designed to replace the factory firmware on a range of IEEE 802.11b wireless access points, specifically those based on the Eumitcom WL11000SA-N board.
