= C. =

C. or c. may refer to:

- Century, sometimes abbreviated as c. or C., a period of 100 years
- Letter C, the third letter in the alphabet.
- Cent (currency), abbreviated c. or ¢, a monetary unit that equals 1/100 of the basic unit of many currencies
- Caius or Gaius, abbreviated as C., a common Latin praenomen
- Circa, abbreviated as c. (or ca., circ., cca, and cc.) a Latin word meaning "about" or "around"
- Abbreviation c. meaning "chapter" in legal citation
- Abbreviation c. (or “cf.”) meaning to contrast (used in scientific articles, legal filings, etc.)
- Prefix c/c. (and cc/cc.) meaning "column(s)" as in-source-locator in old citations (example: "c130")

== See also ==
- C (disambiguation)
- C, third letter of the English and Latin alphabets
- Samuel Taylor Coleridge (1772 – 1834), who sometimes used pen-name C., an English poet and philosopher
