= IECEE =

Technical standards body

The IECEE is the IEC System for Conformity Assessment Schemes for Electrotechnical Equipment and Components being a body of the International Electrotechnical Commission (IEC). The IEC uses the name IECEE for the IEC System for Conformity Testing and Certification of Electrotechnical Equipment and Components that is better known as the CB System

== Background ==
The predecessor of IECEE was a European body founded under the name of Commission internationale de réglementation en vue de l'approbation de l'équipement électrique (International commission on rules for the approval of electrical equipment) known as CEE. Historically this certification process goes back to 1929 based on an initiative by the German VDE (Verband der Elektrotechnik, Elektronik und Informationstechnik).

CEE also devised and published standards for electrical equipment, most of which have been superseded by IEC standards.

== CB Scheme ==
The IEC CB Scheme is multilateral agreement to allow international certification of electrical and electronic products so that a single certification allows worldwide market access.

The CB scheme has its origin in the European "Commission for Conformity Testing of Electrical Equipment" (CEE) which merged into the IEC in 1985. CB system is the abbreviation for the name of the meaning of "Certification Bodies' Scheme", i.e., "system certification body.". As of July 1992, CB system had a total of 30 member countries namely Austria, Australia, Belgium, Canada, Switzerland, China, former Czechoslovakia, Germany, Denmark, Spain, Finland, France, Britain, Greece, Hungary, Ireland, Israel, India, Iceland, Italy, Japan, South Korea, the Netherlands, Norway, Poland, Sweden, Singapore, the former Soviet Union, former Yugoslavia, the United States. Currently there are some 52 member bodies organized in the IECEE and a further 65 NCBs (national certification bodies) support the scheme with 276 CB test labs (CBTL). A product being certified in a certified testing laboratory according to the harmonized standard will receive a CB Report that may be submitted to the national certification bodies like GS, PSE, CCC, NOM, GOST/R, BSMI.

== CEE standards ==
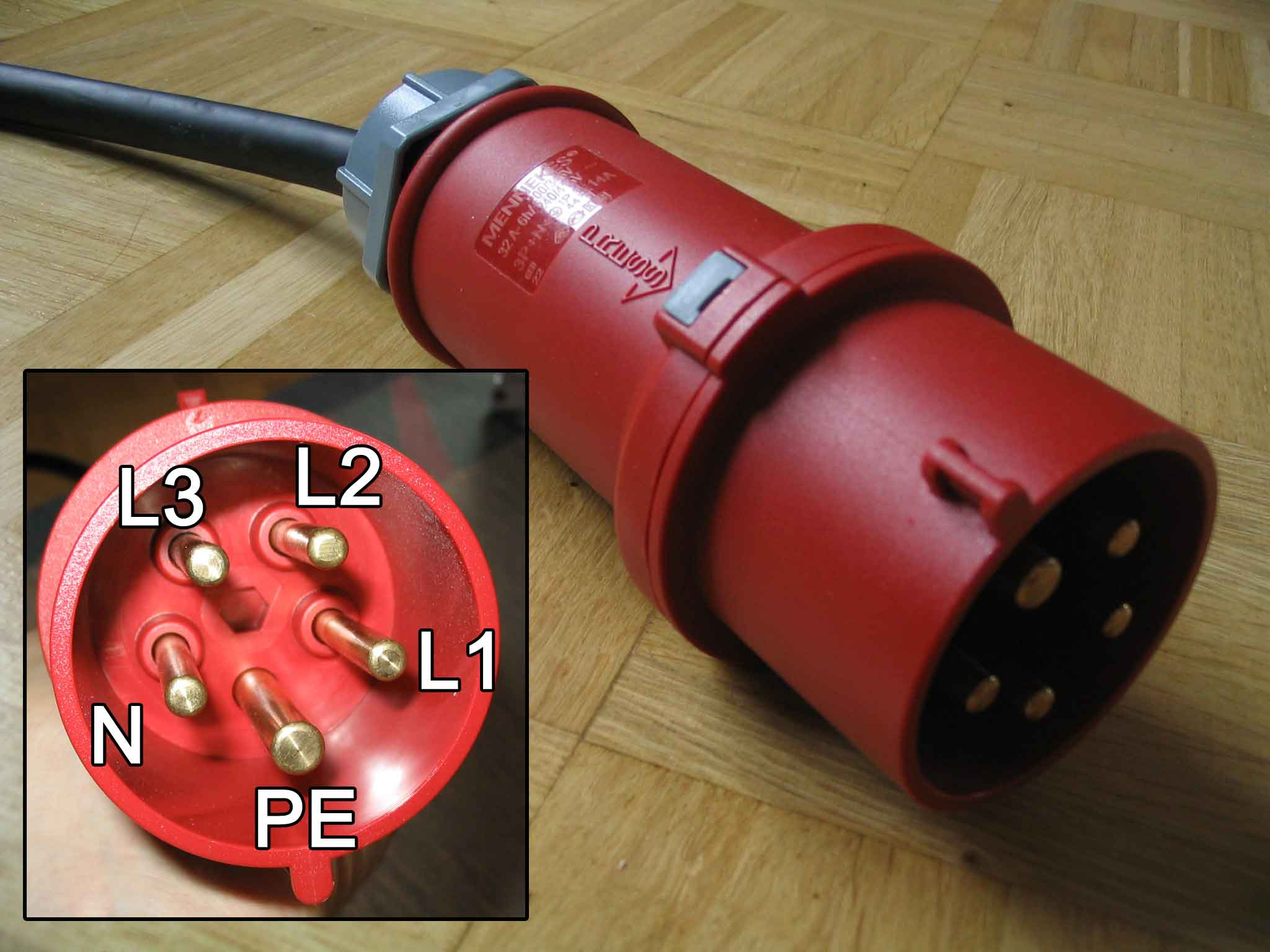
32 A 400 V 3P+N+ CEE 17 standard sheet 9h plug

CEE published a number of standards under its own name. Most of these have been superseded by CENELEC and/or IEC standards.

Standard	Description
CEE 7	Specification for plugs and socket-outlets for domestic and similar purposes. This describes the AC power plugs and sockets in domestic use in many parts of Europe. The 2nd edition was published in 1963 and last updated in March 1983. It remains available from the IEC, but they state that "this standard shall not be used alone, it is to be used in addition to IEC 60884-1".
CEE 13	Specification for polyvinyl chloride insulated cables and flexible cords. Supplanted by CENELEC HD-21 which was adopted as IEC 227 and subsequently updated by the IEC 60227 series.
CEE 17	Specification for plugs and socket-outlets for industrial purposes. It was adopted as IEC 309 and updated to IEC 60309 in 1999.
CEE 22	Specification for appliance couplers for domestic and similar general purposes. It was adopted as IEC 320 and relabled later to IEC 60320.

== See also ==
- Perilex, superseded by the IEC 60309
- International Electrotechnical Commission (IEC)
- Industrial and multiphase power plugs and sockets
