= Group 3 =

Group 3 may refer to:

- Group 3 element, chemical element classification
- Group 3 (motorsport), FIA classification of cars used in auto racing and rallying
- Group 3, the third tier of races in worldwide Thoroughbred horse racing
- Group 3 image format, Group 3 & Group 4 are digital technical standard for compressing and sending faxes
- Group 3 Rugby League, a rugby competition in Australia
- Group 3 Films, a British film production organisation funded by the National Film Finance Corporation

== See also ==
- C group (disambiguation)
- Group C (disambiguation)
- Group (disambiguation)
- 3 (disambiguation)
