= Circle-c =

Circle-c, ©, (c), or variation, may refer to:

- Circle C Ranch, a subdivision in Austin, Texas, USA
- Copyright symbol (©) a circle circumscribing a "c"
- Circle C (©), the former name of Copyright (band)
- Enclosed C (Ⓒ,ⓒ) a "C" inscribed inside a circle

== See also ==
- (C) (disambiguation)
- Copyright symbol (disambiguation)
- C (disambiguation)
