= Line C =

Line C is a line designation used by several public transport systems:

== United States ==
- C (AC Transit), a bus route in the San Francisco Bay Area, California,
- C (Los Angeles Railway), former streetcar service In Los Angeles, California
- C (New York City Subway service), a subway route in New York City, New York
- C Line (Los Angeles Metro), a light rail line in Los Angeles County, California
- C Line (RTD), a light rail line in Denver, Colorado
- Avenue C Line (Manhattan), a bus route in New York City, New York
- Metro C Line (Minnesota), a rapid bus route in Minneapolis, Minnesota
- RapidRide C Line, a bus route in Seattle, Washington

== Elsewhere ==
- C (S-train), a commuter rail line in Copenhagen, Denmark
- Line C (Buenos Aires Underground), a metro line in Buenos Aires, Argentina
- Line C (Prague Metro), a metro line in Prague, Czech Republic
- Line C (Rome Metro), a metro line in Rome, Italy
- Bordeaux Tramway line C, a tram route in Bordeaux, France
- Lyon Metro Line C, a metro line in Lyon, France
- RER C, a commuter rail line in Paris, France

== See also ==
- C Train (disambiguation)
