= C-Note =

C-Note may refer to:

== Film and television ==
- cNote (film), an animated short by Christopher Hinton
- The C Note, an episode of Recess
- C-Note (Prison Break), a character in Prison Break

== Music ==
- C (musical note), the first note of the C major scale
- C-Note (band), an Orlando boy band
- C-Note (album), an album by the musician Prince
- C-Note (rapper), an American rapper
- "C Note", an instrumental by Body Count from Body Count

== Other uses ==
- C-note, slang for the United States one-hundred-dollar bill

== See also ==
- Lil' C-Note, a stage name of Carlon Jeffery
- Lil C-Note, a stage name of Corey Jackson (rapper)
