= C (restaurant) =

Restaurant in Tampere, Finland

Coordinates: 61°29′50.41″N 23°46′18.45″E

C was a restaurant in Tampere, Finland, selected as restaurant of the year in early 2011, by the Finnish Gastronomic Society.

The restaurant received recognition especially for quality ingredients, food preparation according to season and good matching between food and wine.

The restaurant was located west of the Tampere Central Station in the district of Kyttälä. The chief cook of C was Ilkka Isotalo and the sommelier was Christina Suominen. Restaurant Perla was previously located at the same address.

C closed in December 2022.

The address is now occupied by a bistro, Bistro C.
