= IEC 60309 =

International standard for industrial plugs

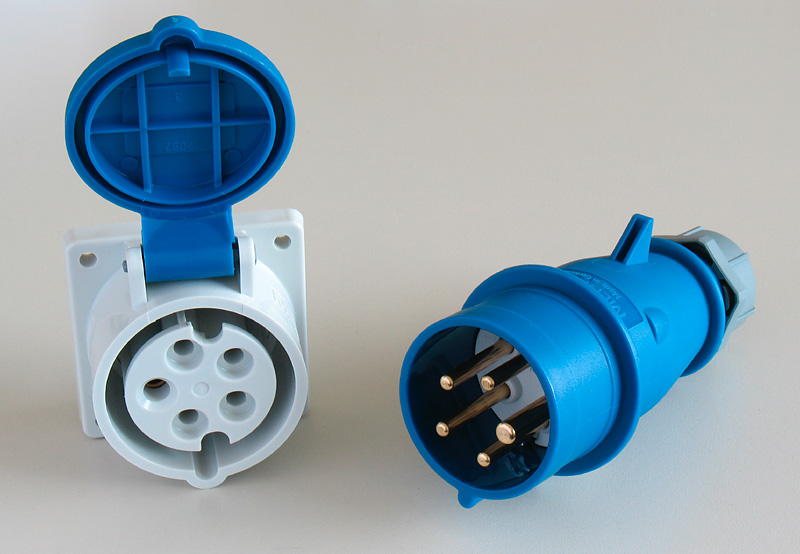
- 16 A 250 V 3P+N+E 9h socket and plug. The round plug shroud has an alignment key that mates with a matching slot in the socket. The female socket has two additional divots which are not required by the standard, but provide access to screws to disassemble the socket. When mated, the spring-loaded cover on the socket hooks over the lug visible on top of the plug to lock the two together.

General specifications
- Width: 250
- Pins: 3–5(+1)

Electrical
- Max. voltage: 1,000 V
- Max. current: 800 A

Pinout
- 200–250 VAC (blue) 16/20 A 2P+E 6h socket for single-phase AC power. Drawn approximately to scale. Clockwise from bottom: PE, L, N.
- 200–240 / 346–415 VAC (red) 125/100 A 3P+N+E 6h socket for three-phase AC power. Drawn approximately to scale. Clockwise from bottom: PE, L1, L2, L3, N.
| PE | Protective Earth | ground |
| N | Neutral | |
| L1 | Line 1 | (AC) Phase 1 |
| L2 | Line 2 | (AC) Phase 2 |
| L3 | Line 3 | (AC) Phase 3 |
| PP | Pilot Pin | (optional) last-make, first-break to control arcing |

IEC 60309 (formerly IEC 309 and CEE 17, also published by CENELEC as EN 60309, and known as "commando" plugs) is a series of international standards from the International Electrotechnical Commission (IEC) for "plugs, socket-outlets and couplers for industrial purposes". They are also referred to as "pin & sleeve" connectors in North America or as "CeeForm" connectors in the entertainment industry. The maximum voltage allowed by the standard is 1000 V DC or AC; the maximum current, 800 A; and the maximum frequency, 500 Hz. The ambient temperature range is −25 °C to 40 °C.

There is a range of plugs and sockets of different sizes with differing numbers of pins, depending on the current supplied and number of phases accommodated. Connectors generally are specified by the voltage and current ratings, general configuration (number of pins), and rotational alignment ("keying"). The fittings are popular in open-air conditions, as the connectors have a minimum IP44 weather-proofing rating. They are also sometimes used in situations where their special capabilities (such as high current rating or three-phase facilities) are not needed, to discourage potential users from connecting domestic appliances to the sockets, as 'normal' domestic plugs will not fit.

The cable connectors and sockets are keyed and colour-coded, according to the voltage range and frequency used; common colours for 50–60 Hz AC power are yellow for 100–130 volts, blue for 200–250 volts, and red for 380–480 volts. The blue fittings are often used for providing weather-proofed exterior sockets for outdoor apparatus. In camping situations, the large 32 A blue fittings provide power to static caravans, whilst the smaller blue 16 A version powers touring caravans and tents. The yellow fittings are used to provide transformer isolated 110 V supplies for UK construction sites to reduce the risk of electric shock, and this use spills over into uses of power tools outside of the construction site environment. The red three-phase versions are used for three-phase portable equipment.

== Standardization ==
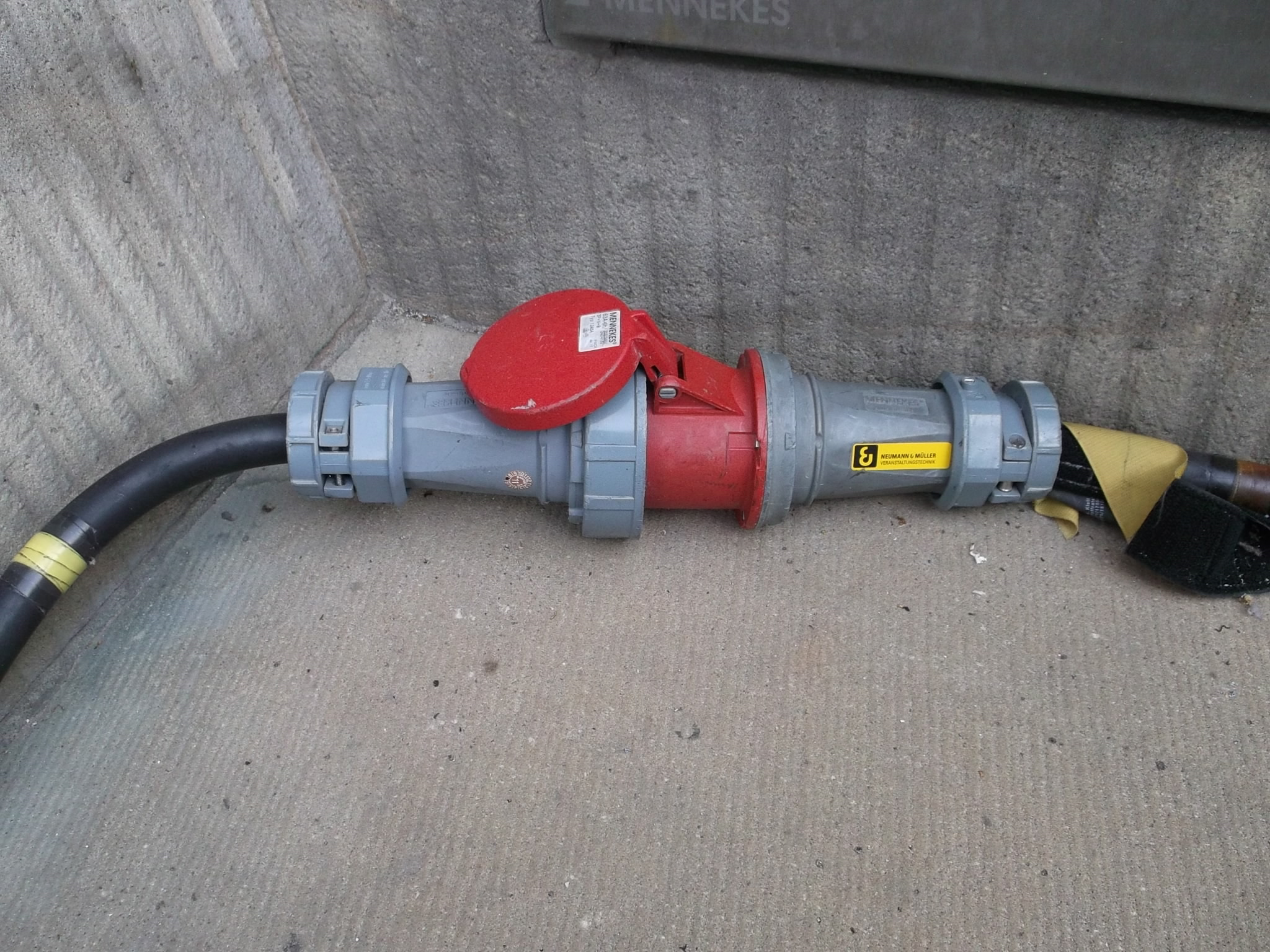
63 A, IP67 mated connection

IEC 60309-1
"Plugs, socket-outlets and couplers for industrial purposes" specifies general functional and safety requirements.
IEC 60309-2
"Dimensional interchangeability requirements for pin and contact-tube accessories" applies to plugs and socket-outlets, cable couplers and appliance couplers with pins and contact tubes of standardized configurations.
IEC 60309-3
"Particular requirements for plugs, socket-outlets, connectors and appliance inlets for use in explosive gas atmospheres". This standard was withdrawn in 1998.
IEC 60309-4
"Switched socket-outlets and connectors with or without interlock" applies to self-contained products that combine within a single enclosure, a socket-outlet or connector according to IEC 60309-1 or IEC 60309-2 and a switching device, with a rated operating voltage not exceeding 1000 VDC or VAC and 500 Hz, and a rated current not exceeding 800 A.
IEC 60309-5
"Dimensional compatibility and interchangeability requirements for plugs, socket-outlets, ship connectors and ship inlets for low-voltage shore connection systems (LVSC)" applies to a single type of plug, socket-outlet, ship connector and ship inlet, intended to connect ships to dedicated shore supply systems described in IEC/IEEE 80005–3.

The standardization was originally done by the CEE (Commission internationale de réglementation en vue de l'approbation de l'équipement électrique), which became IECEE in 1985 (International Commission on the Rules for the Approval of Electrical Equipment) and is now part of the IEC. (This is the same body that produced the "CEE 7" series of domestic AC plugs.) The industrial sockets were standardized in the 1960s in the CEE 17 series that was adopted in the UK as BS 4343, and which are now the IEC 60309 standard.

== Preferred current ratings and wire gauges ==
The standard includes preferred current ratings and wire gauges for both International (deemed Series I) and North American (deemed Series II) applications.

Series I preferred current ratings (in amps) are: 16, 32, 63, 125, 250, 400, 630 and 800, with wire gauges specified as mm^{2}.

Series II preferred current ratings (in amps) are: 20, 30, 60, 100, 200, 300, 350, 500 and 600, with wire gauges specified as AWG and circular mil.

== Environmental protection ==
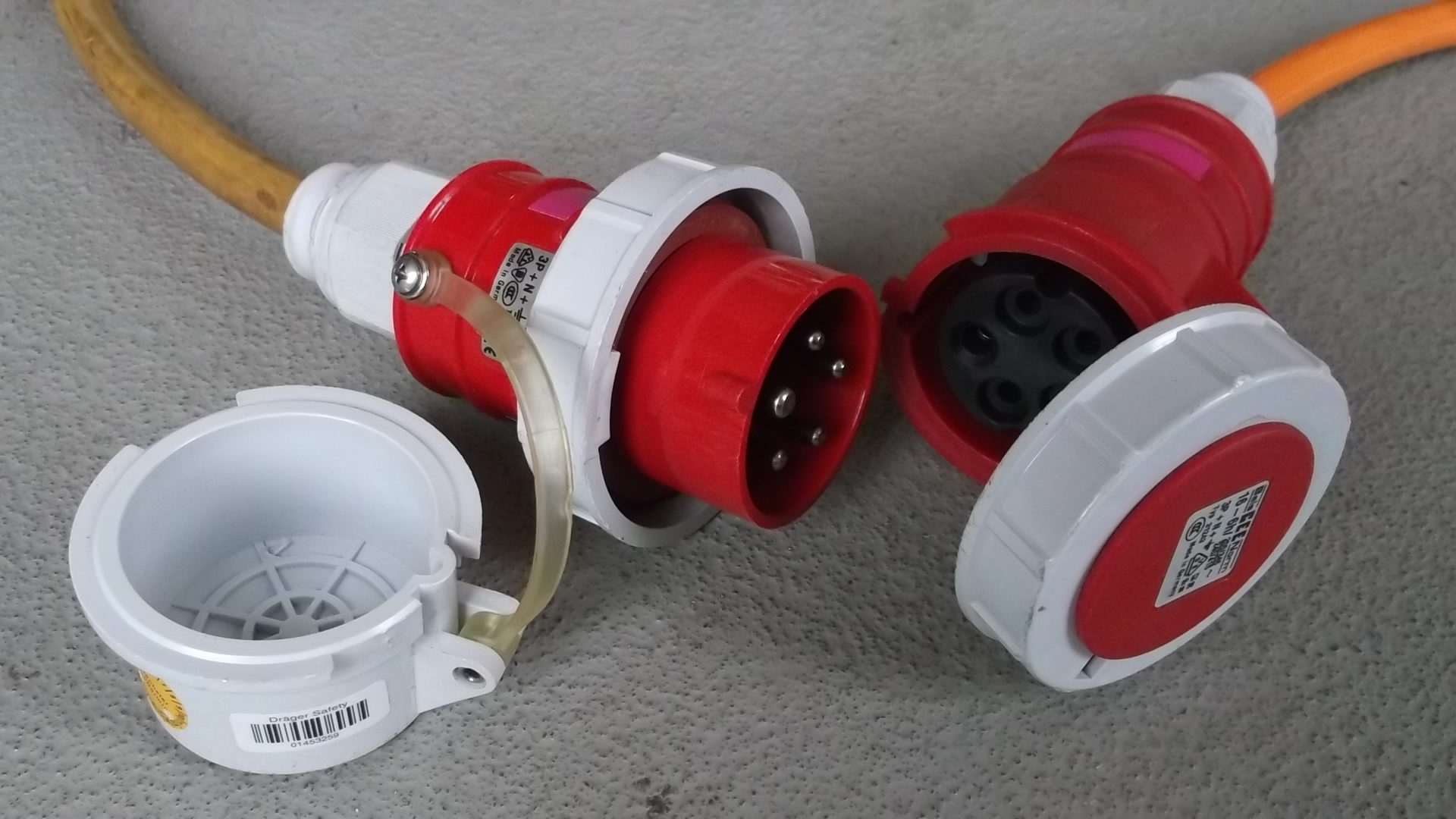
IP67 plug and receptacle

IEC 60309-2 connectors come in IP44 (splash-proof), IP67 (waterproof) and IP66/IP67 (jet-proof/waterproof) variants. In all cases, the rating applies when detached or mated, but not during the mating process.

The more common IP44 variant features a spring-loaded hinged cap over the socket. When a plug is inserted, the cap hooks over a lug on the plug and retains it in place. Fixed connectors are usually installed angled downward to prevent water entering.

The IP67 and IP66/IP67 variants include a gasket and a twist-lock ring which seals the two connectors together.

== Dimensions ==
Plugs have cylindrical connector pins arranged in a circle, with the earth pin 2 mm (0.079 in) larger in diameter than the other pins (used for line/neutral). This is surrounded by a circular shroud on the male connector, which fits into a matching recess on the female connector.

The standard defines connectors with 3, 4 and 5 pins, but a non-standard variant with 7 pins (6 in a circle plus one in the centre) is commercially available; this can be used for star-delta starting of three-phase motors.

Nominal dimensions of some example plugs
| Connector rating (A) | | 16/20 | | | 32/30 | | 63/60 | 125/100 |
| Pins | | 2+E | 3+E | 4+E | 2+E, 3+E | 4+E | All | All |
|---|---|---|---|---|---|---|---|---|
| Line & neutral pins | diameter | 5 mm (0.20 in) | | | 6 mm (0.24 in) | | 8 mm (0.31 in) | 10 mm (0.39 in) |
| Line & neutral pins | length | 37 mm (1.5 in) | | | 45 mm (1.8 in) | | 67 mm (2.6 in) | 71 mm (2.8 in) |
| Earth pin | diameter | 7 mm (0.28 in) | | | 8 mm (0.31 in) | | 10 mm (0.39 in) | 12 mm (0.47 in) |
| Earth pin | length | 37 mm (1.5 in) | | | 45 mm (1.8 in) | | 67 mm (2.6 in) | 71 mm (2.8 in) |
| Pin circle diameter | | 17.5 mm (0.69 in) | 21.5 mm (0.85 in) | 26.5 mm (1.04 in) | 25.0 mm (0.98 in) | 30.3 mm (1.19 in) | 36.5 mm (1.44 in) | 42.5 mm (1.67 in) |
| Plug shroud diameter (>50 V) | inner | 37.9 mm (1.49 in) | 42.8 mm (1.69 in) | 48.8 mm (1.92 in) | 49.7 mm (1.96 in) | 55.6 mm (2.19 in) | 61.5 mm (2.42 in) | 72.5 mm (2.85 in) |
| Plug shroud diameter (>50 V) | outer | 43.5 mm (1.71 in) | 49.5 mm (1.95 in) | 56.1 mm (2.21 in) | 57.3 mm (2.26 in) | 63.4 mm (2.50 in) | 69.5 mm (2.74 in) | 81.5 mm (3.21 in) |
| Plug major key radius | | 3 mm (0.12 in) | | | | | 4 mm (0.16 in) | |

=== Pilot contact ===
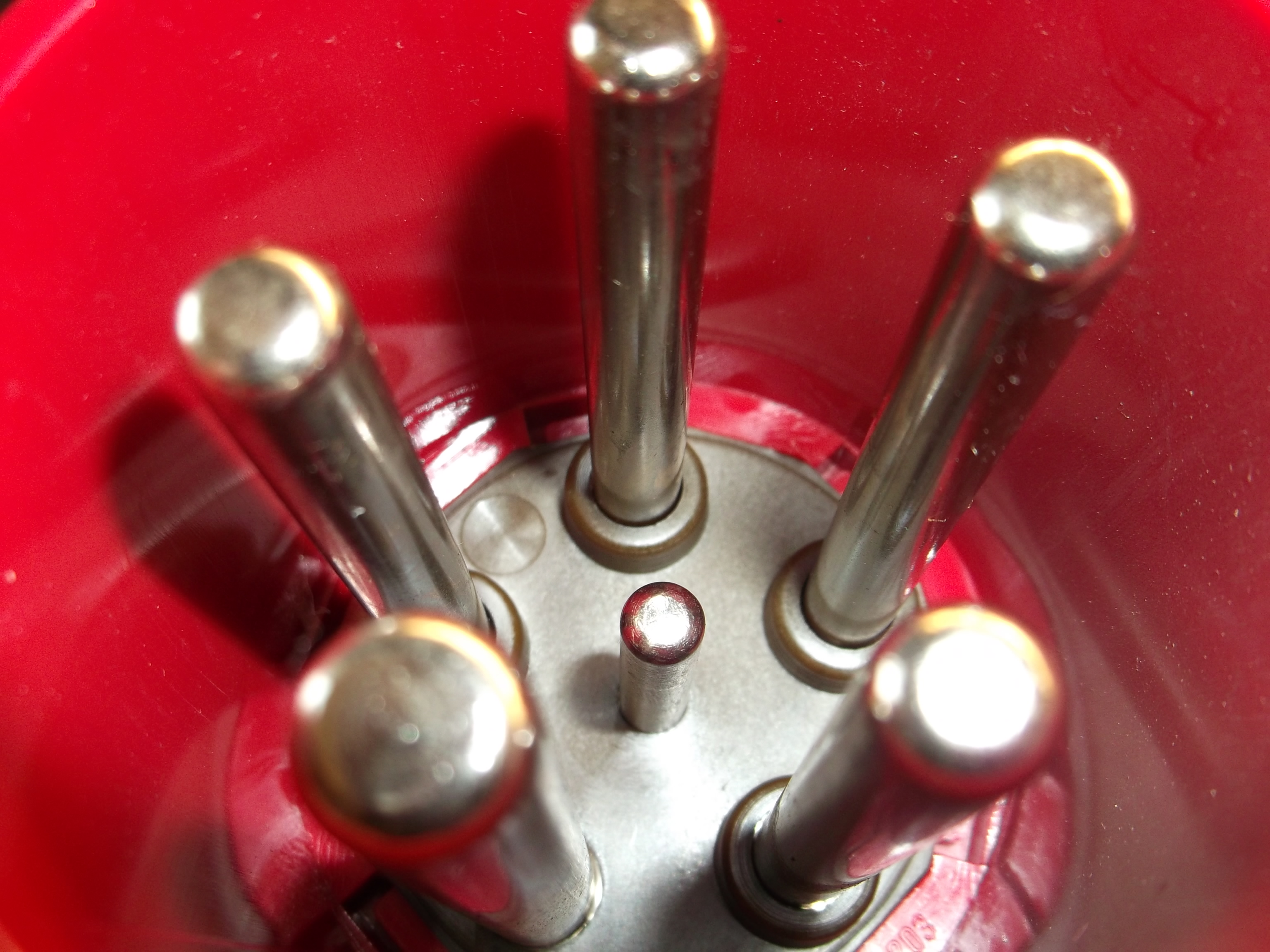
63 A plug with pilot contact

Connectors rated at 63 A and 125 A may optionally feature a 6 mm pilot contact. Located at the centre of the connector, this smaller pin is shorter than the other pins. It is designed to make contact after all other pins when a plug is inserted, and to break contact before the others during disconnection. The pilot contact is used to switch off the load before separation. This is important because disconnecting under load can produce arcing, which may damage the plug and socket and pose a safety risk to the user.

The pilot pin is located in the centre of main contact circle on 4 and 5-pin connectors. On 3-pin (2P+E) connectors, it is located on the contact circle opposite the ground pin. The other connectors are located 105° on either side of the earth pin, rather than 120° as in the smaller variants, to make room for the pilot pin.

=== Extra-low voltage variant ===
The standard specifies an additional, different design for extra-low voltages up to 50 VAC and currents of 16 or 32 A. This resembles, but is larger than, the IEC 60906 DC connector.

Low-voltage compatibility
| | | Plug | |
|---|---|---|---|
| | | 16/20 A | 32/30A |
| Socket | 16/20 A | Yes | Yes |
| Socket | 32/30 A | No | Yes |

On the male plug, three 6 mm pins each 20.5 mm long are equally spaced around a 15.4 mm diameter circle, starting at the 12-o'clock position. They are surrounded by a 23 mm long shroud with an inner diameter of 36 mm and an outer diameter of 42 mm. The pin opposite the major key is optional and may be omitted to make a 2-pin variant. The inner surface of the male plug shroud is flattened at the 6-o'clock position. One or two grooves are cut in the male plug shroud to mate with corresponding keys in the female socket. There is a required major groove at the 6-o'clock position and an optional minor groove at the 12-o'clock position.

24 V, 16 A, 2P, 50/60 Hz: violet connectors (no minor key)

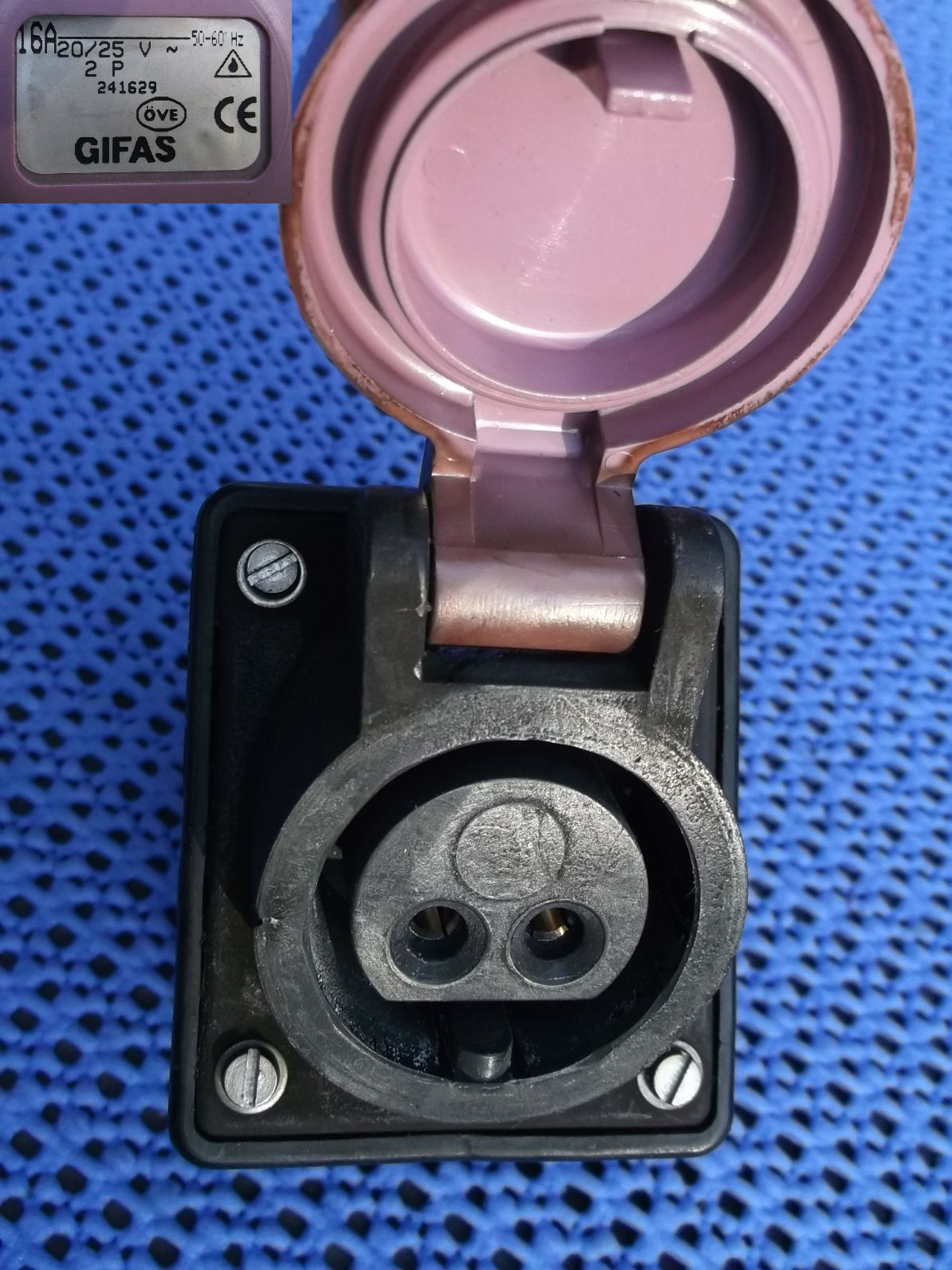
Socket

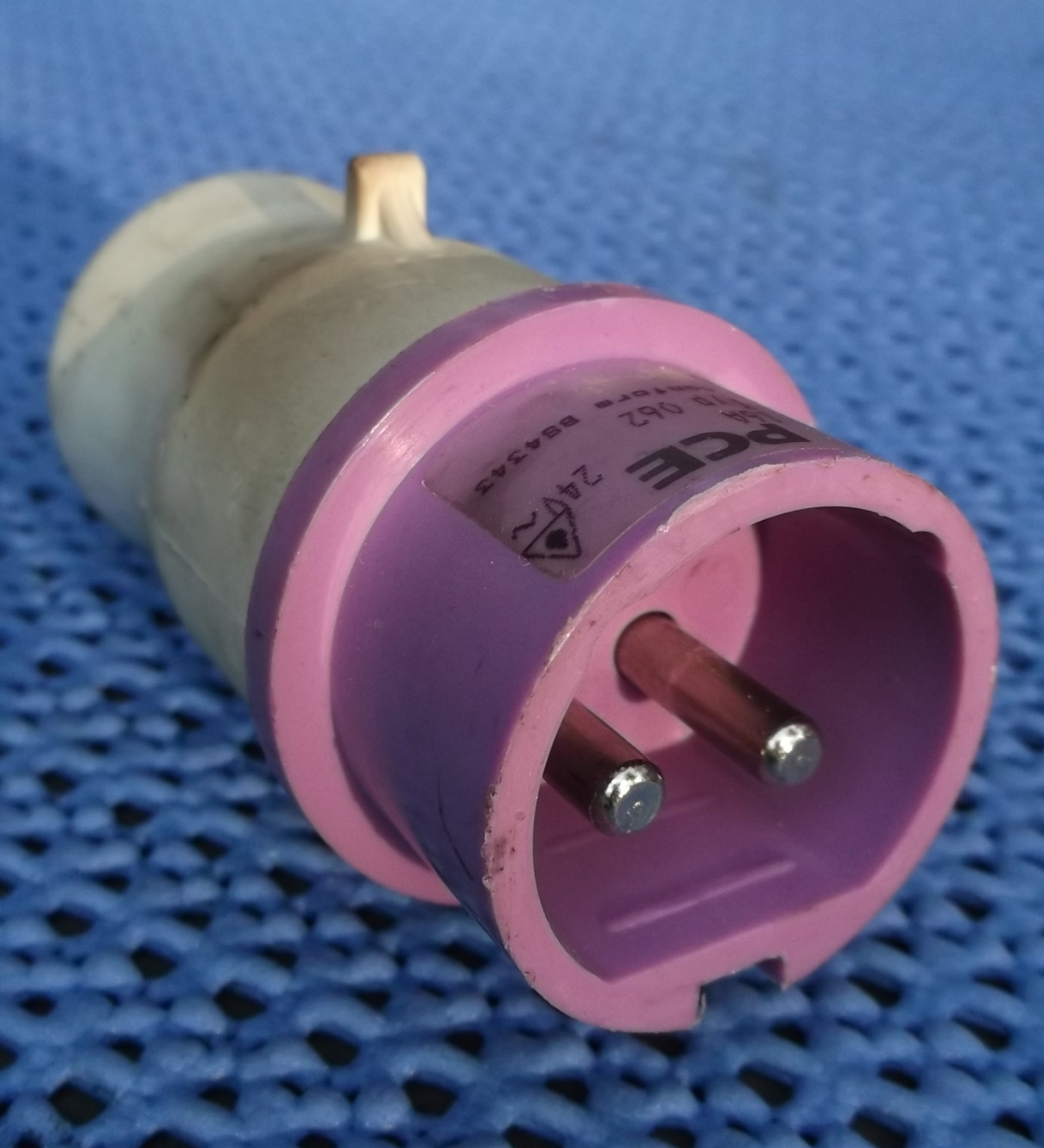
Plug

On the female socket, the major key is 4 mm deep at the 6-o'clock position. The width of the major key defines the current rating: 32 A plugs have a narrower 5 mm wide groove, while 16 A plugs have a wider 8 mm groove, and therefore 32 A plugs can be used with 16 A sockets but 16 A plugs cannot be used with 32 A sockets. The optional minor keyway is the same dimension for both current ratings: 4 mm wide at the 12-o'clock position, which mates with an additional 5 mm wide groove cut through the shroud.

== Colour code ==
The colour of the housing indicates the type of power available. The primary distinction is by rated operating voltage, as follows:

Colour code
| voltage range | 20–25 V | 40–50 V | 100–130 V | 200–250 V | 300–480 V | 500–1000 V |
|---|---|---|---|---|---|---|
| common colour | violet | white | yellow | blue | red | black |
| common application | 24 V single-phase AC/DC power | single-phase AC/DC power | 125 V single-/split-phase AC power | 250 V single-/split-phase AC power | 400 V 3-phase AC power | 500 V on marine vessels |

Less commonly used colour codes
| voltage range | >50 VDC (0 Hz) | 125/250 VAC | 277 V | >50 VAC, 100–500 Hz | 28 VDC |
|---|---|---|---|---|---|
| common colour | white | orange | grey | green | - |
| common application | DC power | 125/250 VAC split-phase (2P+N+E), Series II current ratings | 277 V Series II current ratings single-phase AC power | 115 V 400 Hz aircraft power | 28 VDC aircraft power |

PC Electric (PCE) sell 250 and 400 volt class connectors in their "Series Midnight" range for use during entertainment events, with the intention that the black shells be less distracting from the performance.

== Keying ==
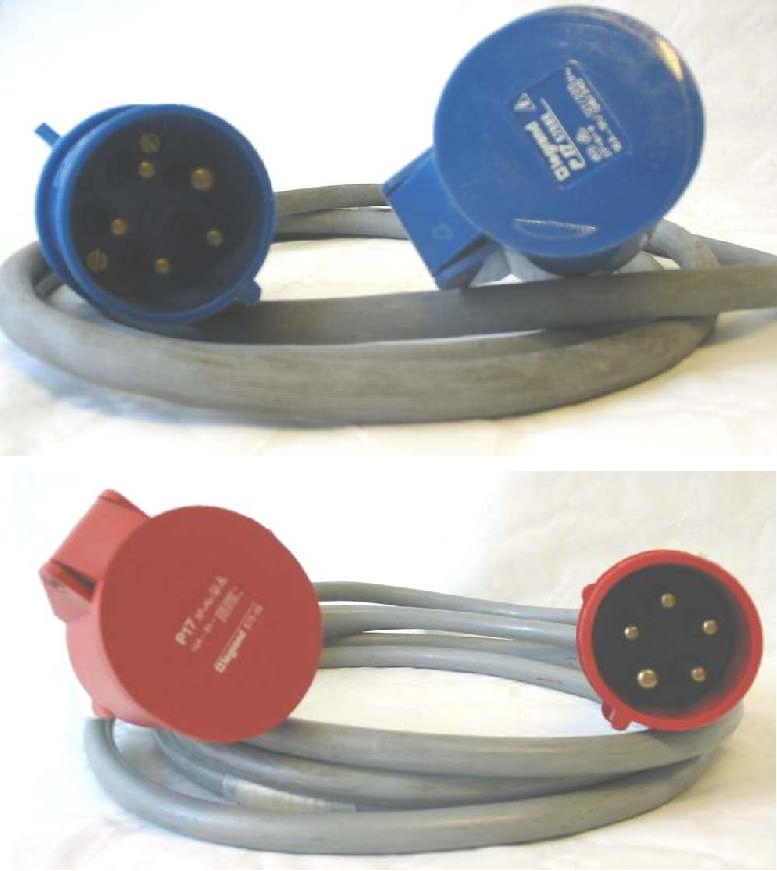
Cables with 3P+N+E connectors. The upper, blue cable has 9h keying, while the lower red cable has 6h keying.

In addition to the colour code, connectors are keyed in one of 12 positions to ensure that incompatible utilization voltages cannot be connected. Different voltage and frequency combinations are distinguished by the location of the earth pin (or a plastic projection called the minor keyway, for connectors with no earth pin), as shown in the following table. The earth pin can be in one of twelve locations, described by clock positions 1h through 12h, spaced at 30° intervals around the circle on which all the pins lie. The various positions are referenced from the view of the open side of a socket; the 6 o'clock (6h, 180°) position is at the same angle as the major keyway, and is oriented downwards. The major keyway is a projection on the plug shroud which aligns with a notch on the socket. The earth pin has a larger diameter than the other pins, preventing the wrong type of plug being inserted in a socket.

IEC 60309-2 variants (> 50 V) (Note: Unless otherwise specified, AC frequency is both 50 and 60 Hz)
| Earth pin position | Pin configuration (Note: For the P/N/E notation, P: pole(s); N: neutral; E: earth/ground; Otherwise, provides (number of poles (P) and total wires (W))) | | |
| Earth pin position | P+N+E, 2P+E (2P3W) (Note: Single-phase plugs & sockets) | 3P+E (3P4W) (Note: Three-phase plugs & sockets, unless otherwise noted) | 3P+N+E (4P5W) |
|---|---|---|---|
| 30° / 1h | Not standardized, reserved for special purposes | | |
| 60° / 2h | >50 VAC, >300 to 500 Hz (green) | | |
| 90° / 3h | >50 to 250 VDC (white) | 380 V, 50 Hz; 440 V, 60 Hz (red) | 220/380 V, 50 Hz; 250/440 V, 60 Hz (red) |
| 120° / 4h | 100–130 VAC (yellow) | 100–130 VAC (yellow) in UK, 55/110 VAC (Note: Split-phase (2P+N+E)) | 57–75 or 100–130 VAC (yellow) |
| 150° / 5h | 277 VAC, 60 Hz (grey) | 600–690 VAC (black) | 347–400 or 600–690 VAC (black) |
| 180° / 6h | 200–250 VAC (blue) | 380–415 VAC (red) | 200–240 or 346–415 VAC (red) |
| 210° / 7h | 480–500 VAC (black) | 480–500 VAC (black) | 277–288 or 480–500 VAC (black) |
| 240° / 8h | >250 VDC (white) | Not used | Not used |
| 270° / 9h | 380–415 VAC (red) | 200–250 VAC (blue) | 120–144 or 208–250 VAC (blue) |
| 300° / 10h | >50 VAC, 100–300 Hz (green) | | |
| 330° / 11h | Not used | 440–460 VAC, 60 Hz (red) | 250–265 or 440–460 VAC, 60 Hz (red) |
| 360° / 12h | Not specified (Note: Voltage supply from an isolating transformer) (white) | 125/250 VAC (orange) | Not specified (white) |
Clock diagram for the regular (>50 V) connector series, viewed looking in to the socket end.

The extra-low voltage connector also supports keying, although in this case the angle is the position of the minor key, assuming the major key is at the 6h position (180°). Minor key positions 5h, 6h and 7h are unavailable, as they would overlap with the major key, but an unkeyed variant exists.

IEC 60309-2 variants (< 50 V)
| Minor keyway position | Pin configuration | |
| Minor keyway position | 2P | 3P |
|---|---|---|
| No minor keyway | 20–25 VAC (violet) | |
| 30° / 1h | Not standardized, reserved for special purposes | |
| 60° / 2h | 20–25 & 40–50 VAC, 300 Hz (green) | |
| 90° / 3h | 20–25 & 40–50 VAC, 400 Hz (green) | |
| 120° / 4h | 20–25 & 40–50 VAC, 100–200 Hz (green) | |
| 150° / 5h | Not used, blocked by major keyway | |
| 180° / 6h | Not used, blocked by major keyway | |
| 210° / 7h | Not used, blocked by major keyway | |
| 240° / 8h | Not standardized, reserved for special purposes | |
| 270° / 9h | Not standardized, reserved for special purposes | |
| 300° / 10h | <50 VDC (white) | Not used |
| 330° / 11h | 20–25 & 40–50 VAC, >400 to 500 Hz (green) | |
| 360° / 12h | 40–50 VAC (white) | |
Clock diagram for the low-voltage (<50 V) connector series

== Common plugs ==
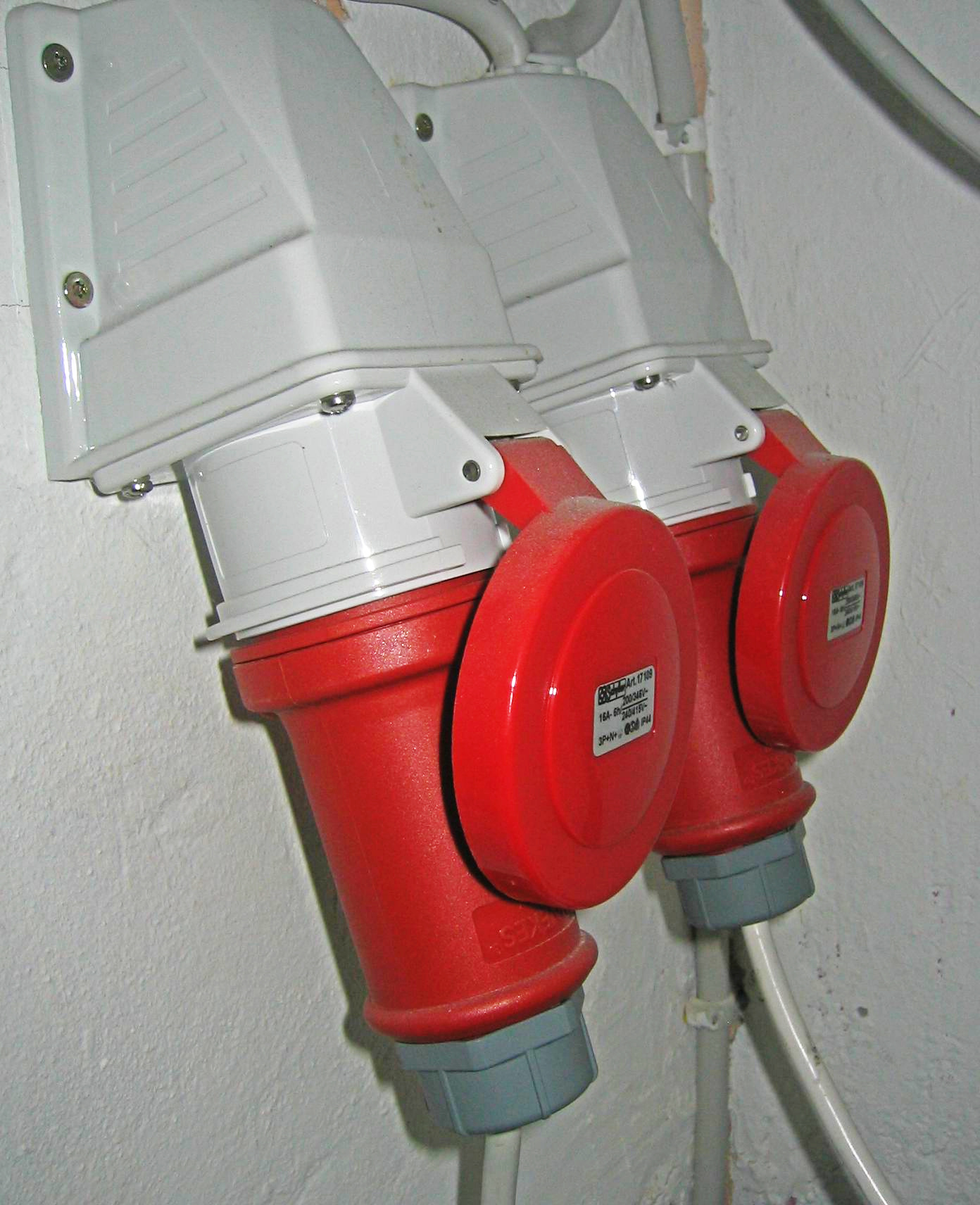
Two IEC 60309-style plugs inserted into wall-mounted sockets

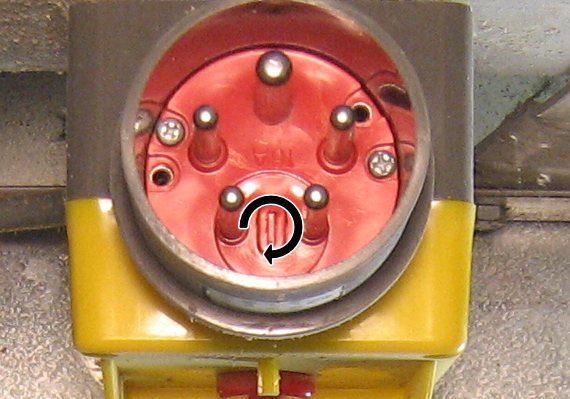
400 V phase swap plug

=== Red 3P+N+E, 6h ===
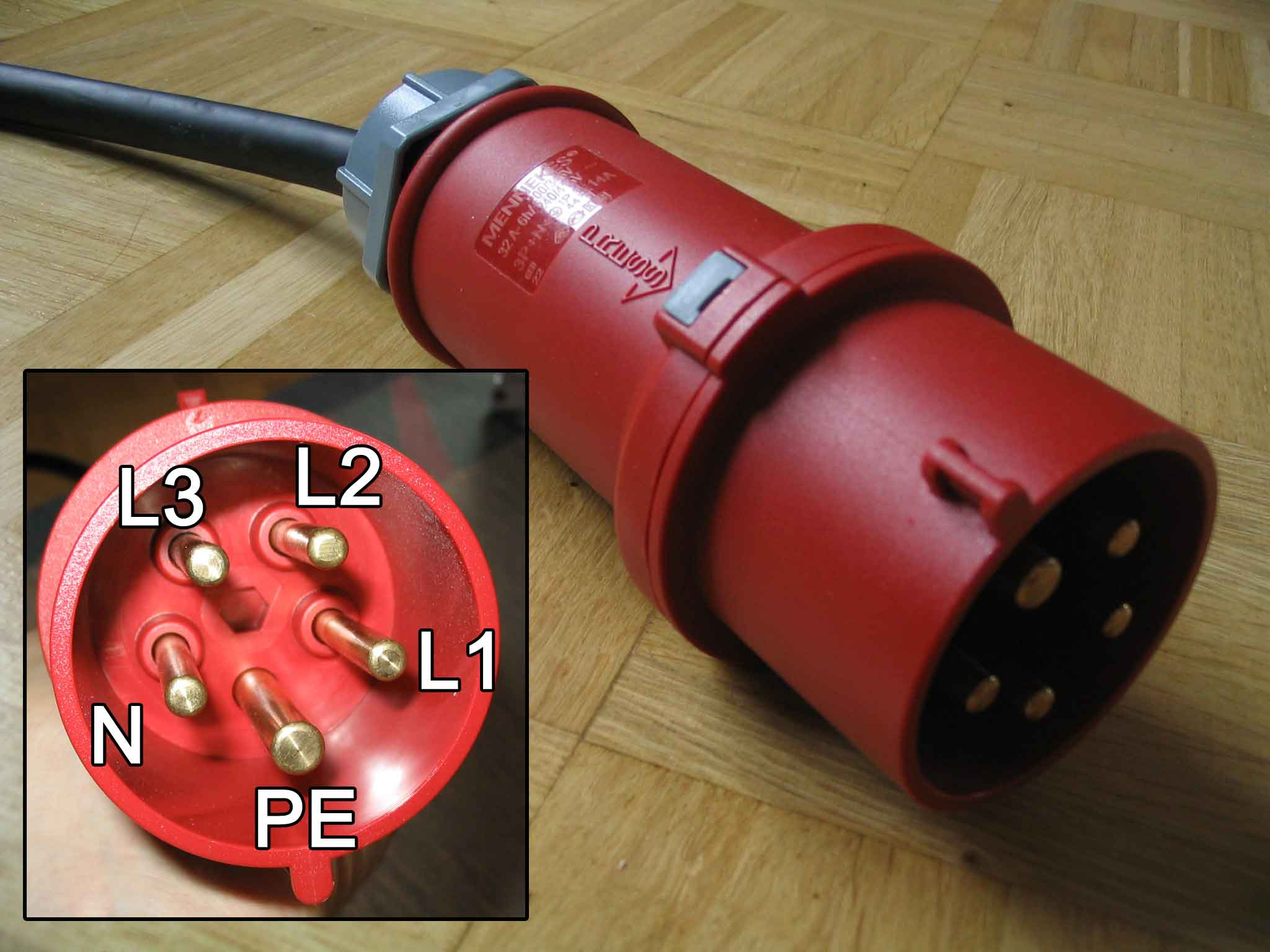
32 A 400 V 3P+N+E 6h (180°) plug

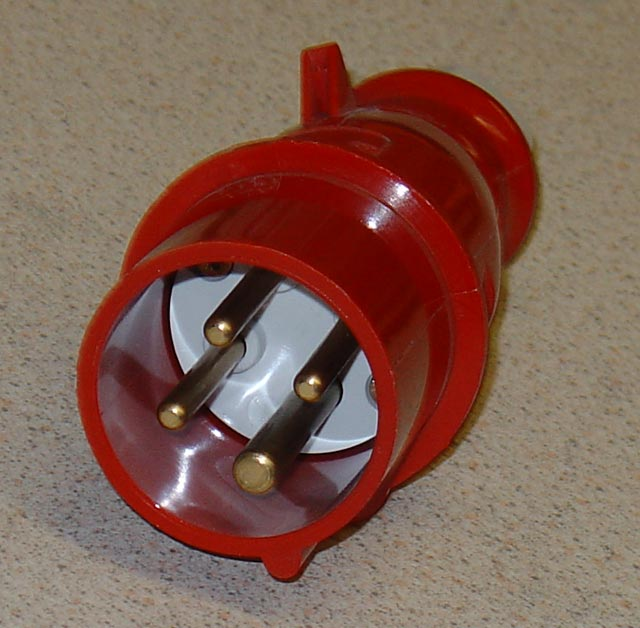
16 A 400 V 3P+E 6h plug

The red 3P+N+E, 6h (180°) plug allows connecting to the widespread 400 V three phase power network. The most common ratings are 16 A, 32 A and 63 A, with 125 A less common. Construction sites in central Europe have most of their higher power cabling setup with this three phase socket type as the single phase to neutral voltage of 230 V is available for other devices. So called power splitters with this connector as a 3 phase inlet and 3 groups of single phase outputs with individual circuit breakers are generally used to achieve this, and allow load balancing across the phases, important on generator supplies. Similar configurations are used for outdoor exhibitions, festivals and large events.

When looking at the mating face of the socket, the phase sequence should be L1, L2, L3, and then the neutral pin, proceeding clockwise from the earth pin. (Counter-clockwise on the corresponding plug.) Since some wiring may be reversed, which would make motors turn backward, many machines on construction sites feature a phase swap plug that allows the L2 and L3 phase pins to be swapped, thereby reversing the phase sequence.

Three-phase electric motors do not need the neutral wire to function, so that there is also a red four pin variant (3 phases and earth) of the IEC 60309 plugs for three phase power. The two styles are not intermatable, to prevent a potential floating neutral.

=== Blue P+N+E, 6h ===
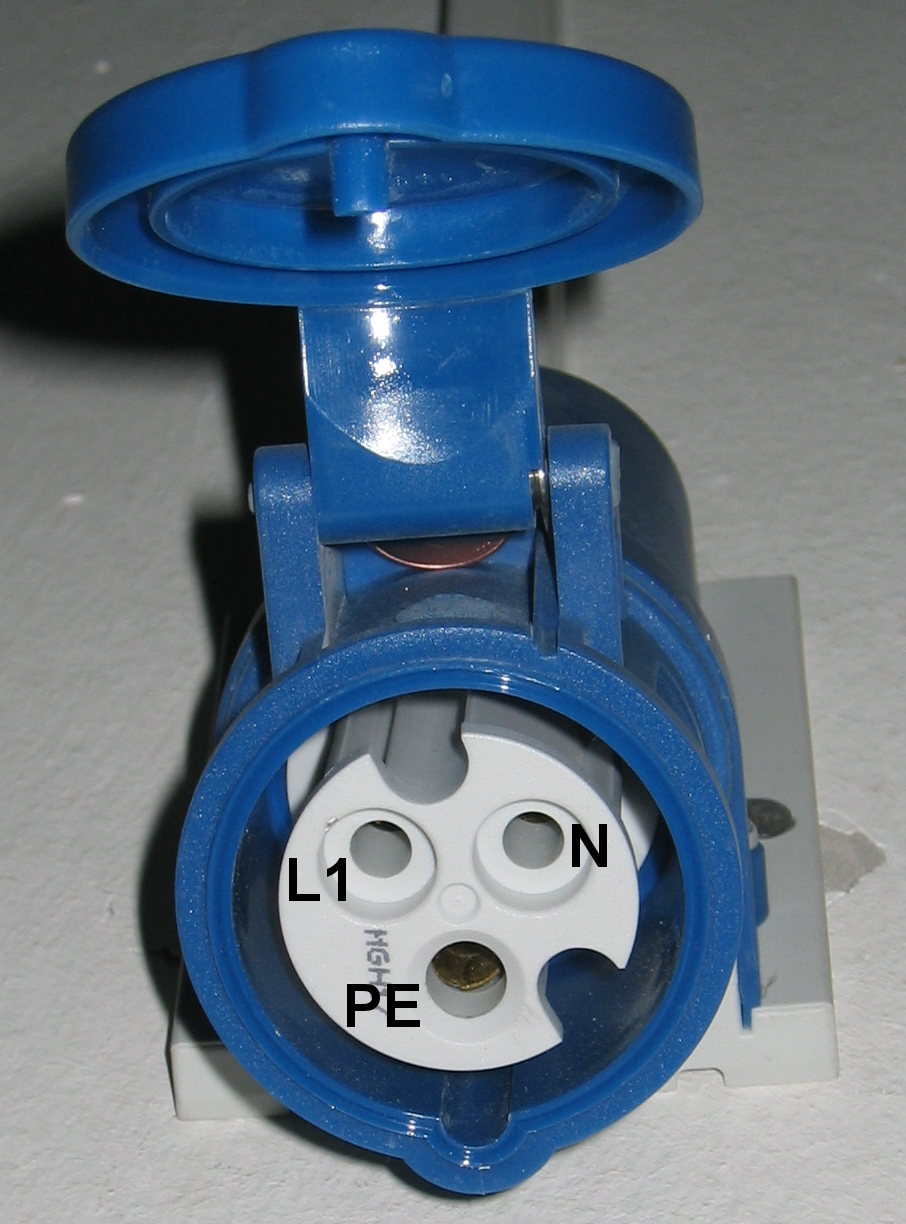
16 A 230 V P+N+E 6h socket

The blue P+N+E, 6h (180°) plug is a single phase connector. In particular the smallest (16 A) weather-resistant variant has become especially common in camping vehicles and sockets found in RV parks and marinas throughout Europe. The so-called 'Caravan Mains Socket' has almost universally replaced a wide variety of other national 230 V domestic plugs, since it is pan-European and inherently safe to standard IP44. On larger temporary buildings, particularly with electric heating, the larger 32 A is more common.

The pins are specified to be in the order earth, phase, and neutral, clockwise when looking at the socket. Not all installations distinguish the line (phase) and neutral conductors, and reverse wired sockets are not uncommon, so double pole breaking RCDs and main switches are recommended. When sockets are mounted looking downwards then the connector system is rated for outdoor use in all weather. This is also the standard connector for lighting equipment (up to 16 A) used in the British film and television industry (often as outlets from a power splitter with a higher rated 3 phase input).

=== Yellow P+N+E, 4h ===
The yellow P+N+E, 4h (120°) plug is a single phase connector that is in widespread use on the British Isles for 110 V building site and fairground applications. A popular model of this socket type is marketed under the brand name MK Commando which leads some users to refer to all IEC 60309 sockets by the generic trademark Commando sockets.

=== Blue 3P+N+E, 9h ===
The blue 3P+N+E, 9h (270°) plug is a three phase connector available in areas with both 115 V and 230 V supply systems (mains). It is prevalent in the outdoor event lighting and audio power industry as an outdoor-safe replacement for NEMA connectors. In the United States it is not usually used for three phase power but for the high leg delta wiring of split-phase electric power (unknown in Europe). This allows one to choose single-phase AC power at either 110–120 volts between phase and neutral or 220–240 volts between phase and phase. Since these two modes do not need three phases there is also a dark yellow-orange four-pin connector available designed for a single-phase 110–120 or 220–240 volt load.

It is best to connect the high leg adjacent to the earth pin, so that it will not be misplaced by phase-swap plugs.

== Switched-socket outlets with interlocks ==
Switched-socket outlets with interlocks are described in IEC 60309-4 standard and are commonly used to enhance electrical safety in industrial plants. The interlock cuts power to the socket when nothing's plugged in and locks any plug in the socket until the power is turned off.

== See also ==
- Industrial and multiphase power plugs and sockets
- IEC 62196 for electric vehicles
- Perilex, obsolescent DIN connector
- IEC 60906-3 a series of smaller 16 A low-voltage connectors with a superficially similar appearance
