= Copyright symbol (disambiguation) =

Copyright symbol is the international symbol of copyright represented by ©.

Copyright symbol or copyright sign may also refer to:

- Copyright (band) (formerly ©), a Canadian music band
- Copyright (or ©), a 2010 album by Finnish hip hop band Teflon Brothers
- ©, the name used for early recordings by the American musician Leslie Winer

== See also ==
- (C) (disambiguation)
- Circle-c (disambiguation)
- Registered trademark symbol
- Trademark symbol
- Copyright
