= C Train (disambiguation) =

CTrain is a light rail system in Calgary, Alberta, Canada.

C Train may also refer to:

- C (New York City Subway service)
- Green Line C branch, of the Massachusetts Bay Transportation Authority
- MTR C-Stock EMU in Hong Kong
- C Line (Los Angeles Metro), a light rail line in Los Angeles County, California
- C-train, a type of road train

== See also ==
- Line C (disambiguation)
