= Perilex =

Type of electric power connector system

pinout of Perilex connectors. When viewing the socket from the front, the assignment is: PE = centre N = top left R (L1) = bottom left S (L2) = top right T (L3) = bottom right

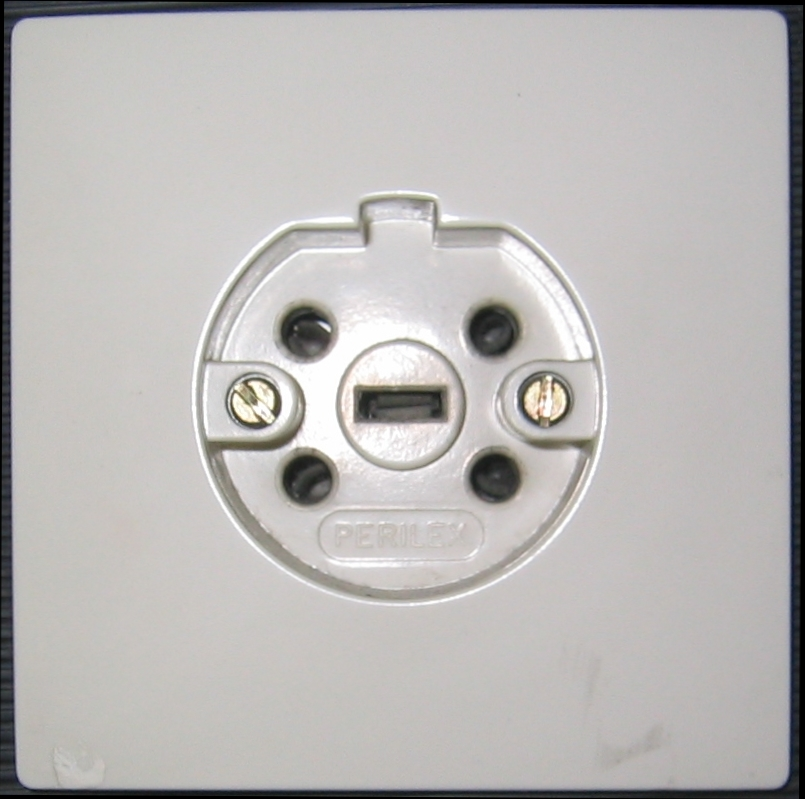
16 A Perilex socket

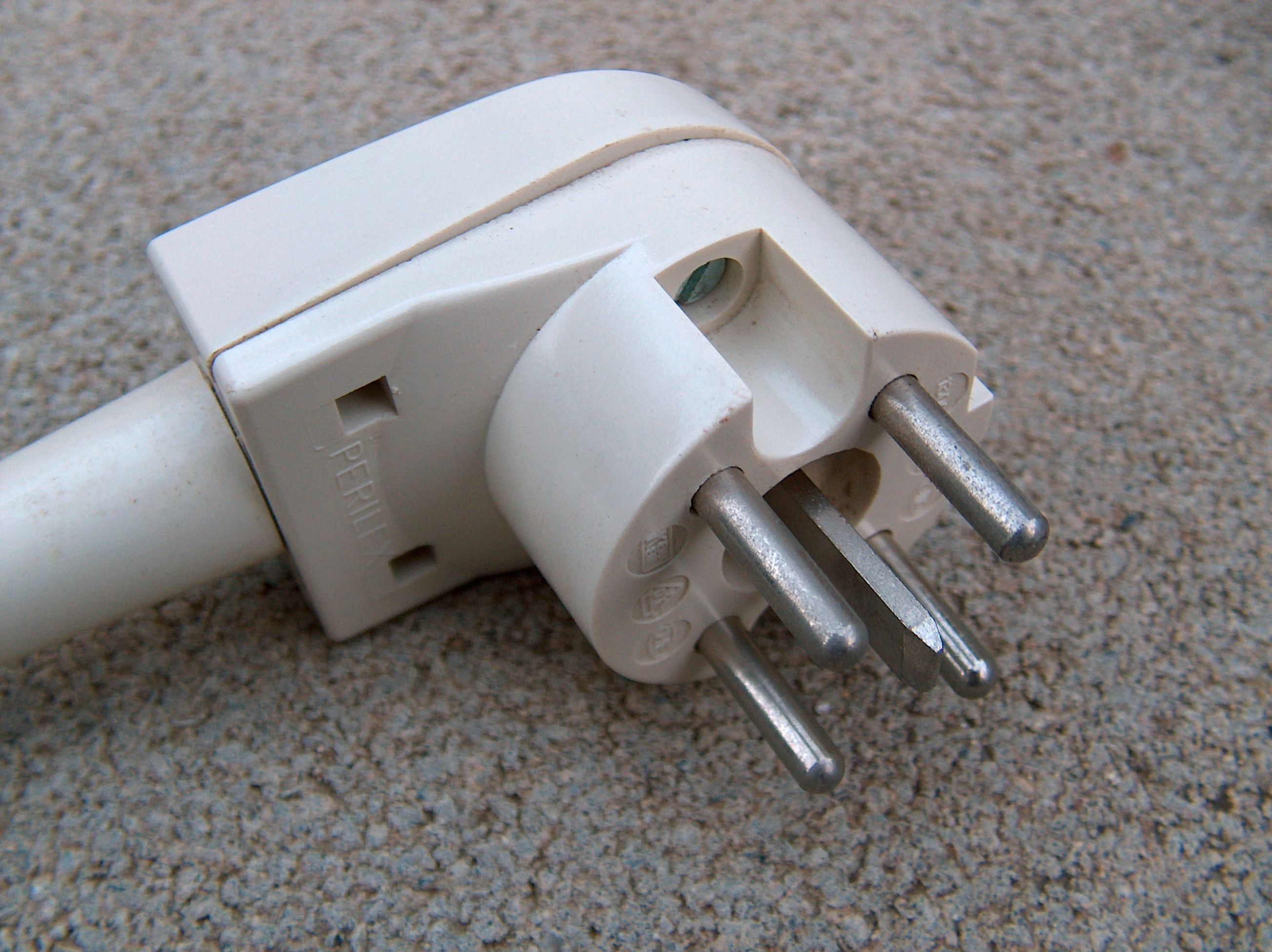
16 A Perilex plug

Perilex is the trade name for an approved indoor five-pin three-phase electric power connector system used in Germany, the Netherlands and Sweden. It has mostly been superseded by the IEC 60309 system used throughout Europe.

There are two variants, a more common 16 A version and a rarely used 25 A version. The connectors are equipped with five pins for protective earth (PE), a neutral conductor (N) and three phase conductors (L1, L2, L3; formerly: R, S, T). As the German industrial standard VDE 0100 prescribed the phase sequence for all types of three-phase connectors in a way incompatible with the original Perilex pinout, the R and T connectors may have been swapped. The PE socket protrudes slightly in order to give PE "first mate, last break" characteristics. In order to distinguish the variants, the 16 A version has a horizontal PE pin, whereas it is vertical in the 25 A variant.

In Germany, Perilex connectors have been standardised by DIN. The 16 A version is DIN 49445 (socket) and DIN 49446 (plug) and the 25 A version is DIN 49447 (socket) and DIN 49448 (plug). For indoor use at max 25A, it replaced an earlier (interwar period) flat oval-shaped 4-pin connector (3 phases and protective earth) that was standardized in DIN 49450 / DIN 49451. for up to 100A. These oval plugs could get damaged, accidentally or intentionally in order to try reversing the rotation direction of a motor like those with older 3-pin connectors, thus they were considered a peril that needed to be eliminated by a better system. The Perilex range was introduced in 1951 by supplier Busch-Jaeger and came in common use in the 1960s when electric stoves became popular. The oval system was removed in West Germany from 1974 until 1980, replaced by the IEC 60309 system, but use continued in East Germany even after reunification, mainly in farms.

The Perilex connectors were usually confined to small businesses (e.g. bakeries, restaurants), medical facilities (hospitals, laboratories) and homes, where they had the advantages of smaller form factor and better cleanability. As electric stoves in kitchens usually remain in use for years at the same place their wires are often connected directly in a junction box without any plug, like tankless water heating. If devices are mobile, frequently plugged and unplugged, and used in various places, a robust and commonly used system is preferred, thus Perilex was superseded by the IEC 60309 system used throughout Europe. At construction sites and industrial facilities, on fairgrounds and in concert venues, the IEC connectors are preferred due to their better robustness and due to being approved for medium-term outdoor use. Furthermore, it is unwise to connect three-phase electrical motors to Perilex sockets due to the aforementioned ambiguity regarding the phase sequence. Since 1 January 1975, the new installation of the Perilex system has been "outlawed" in Germany for industrial installation, but use continues to be legal in homes, hospitals and small businesses.

A conceptually similar (but incompatible) plug exists in Switzerland as SN 441011 type 15 (10 A) and type 25 (16 A).

In France, instead of Perilex, NF C 61-315 was used. NF C 61-315 provides single & multiple phases for rating up to 32 A. Several plug & socket profiles exist to match the phases number and the various rating. But NF C 61-315 is being replaced by IEC 60309 for outdoor use or direct attach for home use (mainly oven plugs).
