= Mazda CX =

Mazda CX may refer to the following Mazda crossover SUVs:

- Mazda CX-3 (subcompact crossover SUV, 2014–present)
- Mazda CX-30 (subcompact crossover SUV, 2019–present)
- Mazda CX-4 (compact crossover SUV sold exclusively in China, 2016–2025)
- Mazda CX-5 (compact crossover SUV, 2012–present)
- Mazda CX-50 (compact crossover SUV sold exclusively in North America, Colombia, and China, 2022–present)
- Mazda CX-60 (mid-size crossover SUV sold exclusively outside North America, 2022–present)
- Mazda CX-7 (mid-size crossover SUV, 2006–2012)
- Mazda CX-70 (mid-size crossover SUV sold exclusively in North America, 2024–present)
- Mazda CX-8 (mid-size crossover SUV sold exclusively outside North America, 2017–present)
- Mazda CX-80 (mid-size crossover SUV sold exclusively outside North America, 2024–present)
- Mazda CX-9 (mid-size crossover SUV sold exclusively outside Japan, 2006–2024)
- Mazda CX-90 (large crossover SUV sold exclusively outside Japan, 2023–present)

== Gallery ==
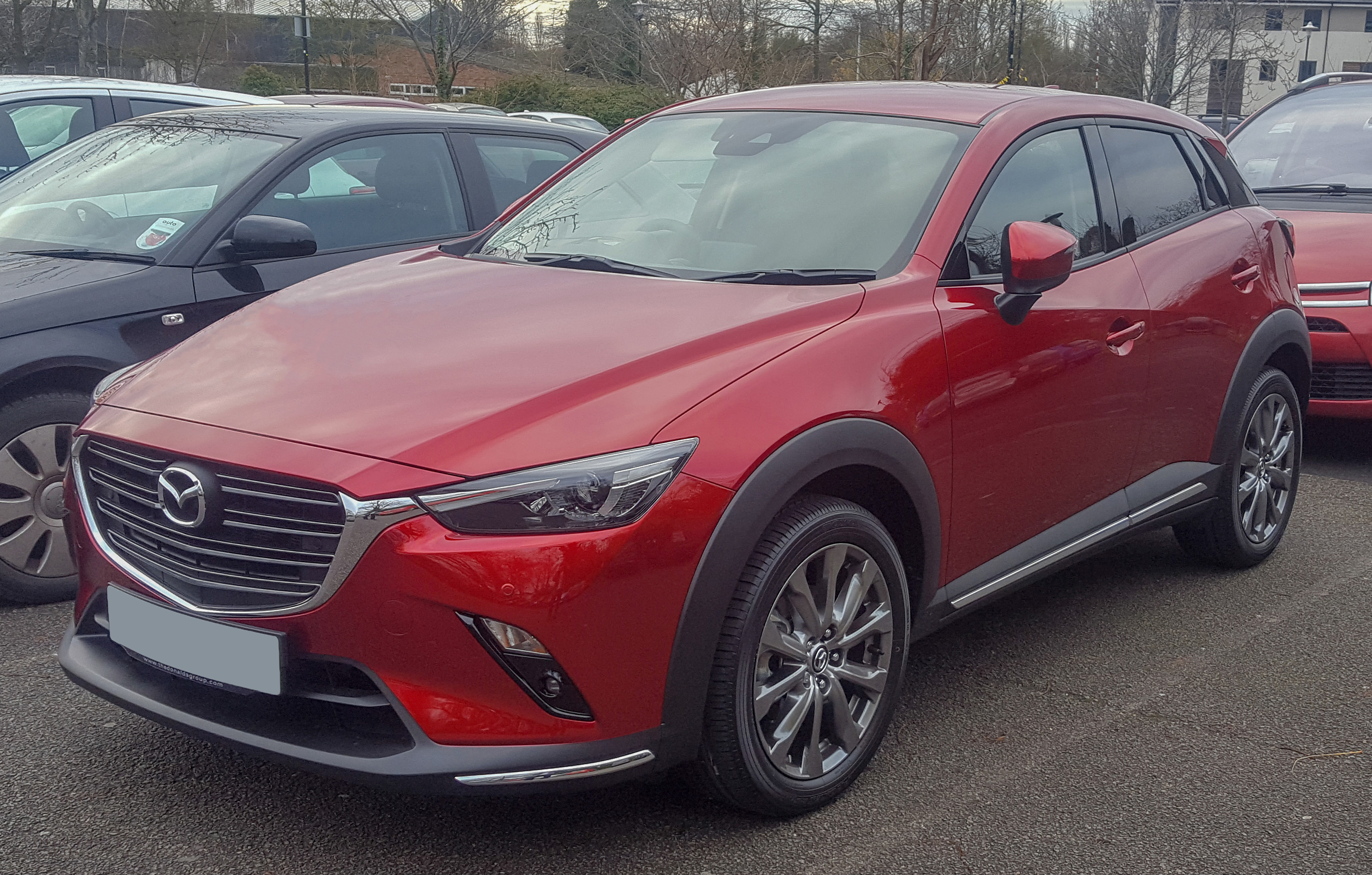
Mazda CX-3

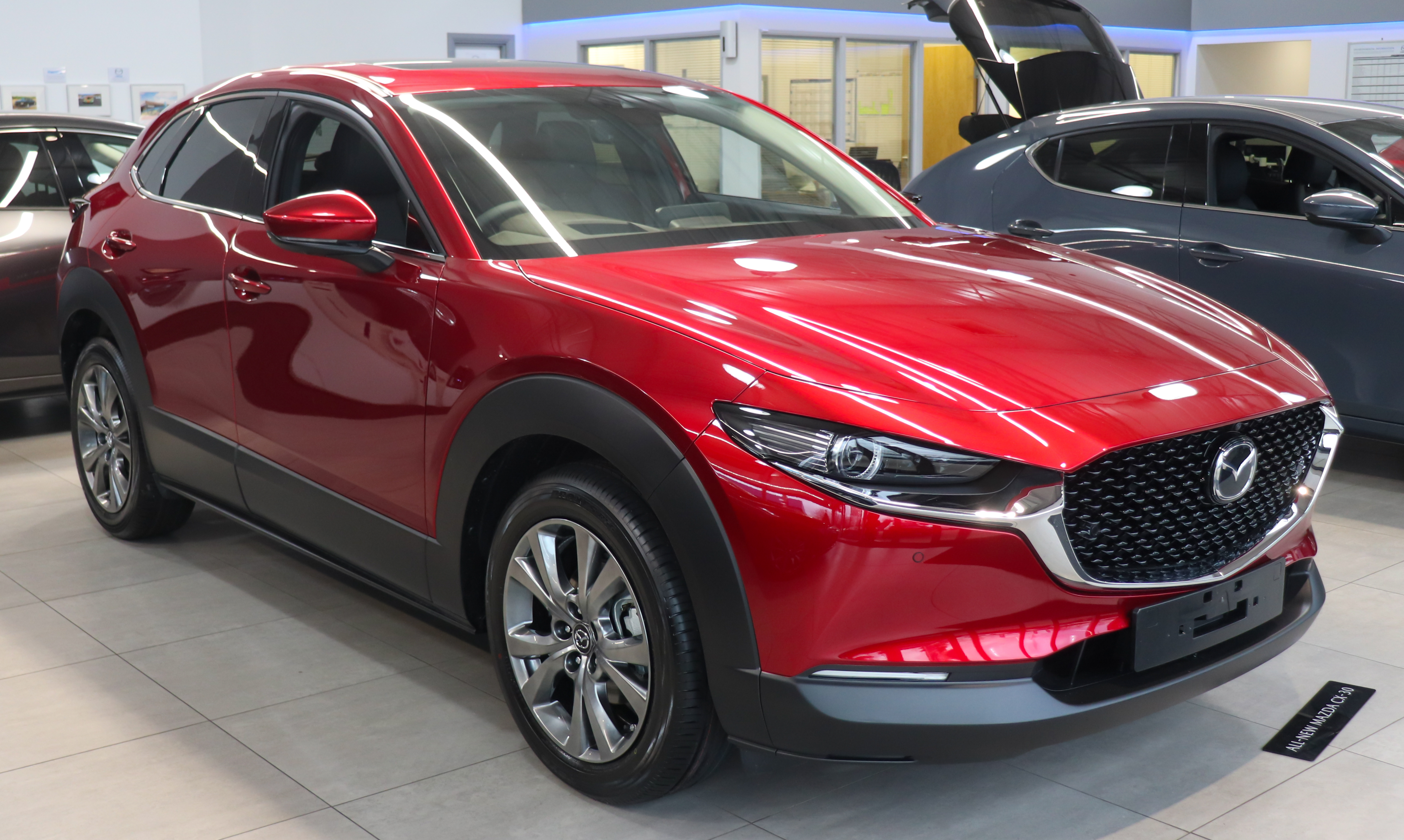
Mazda CX-30

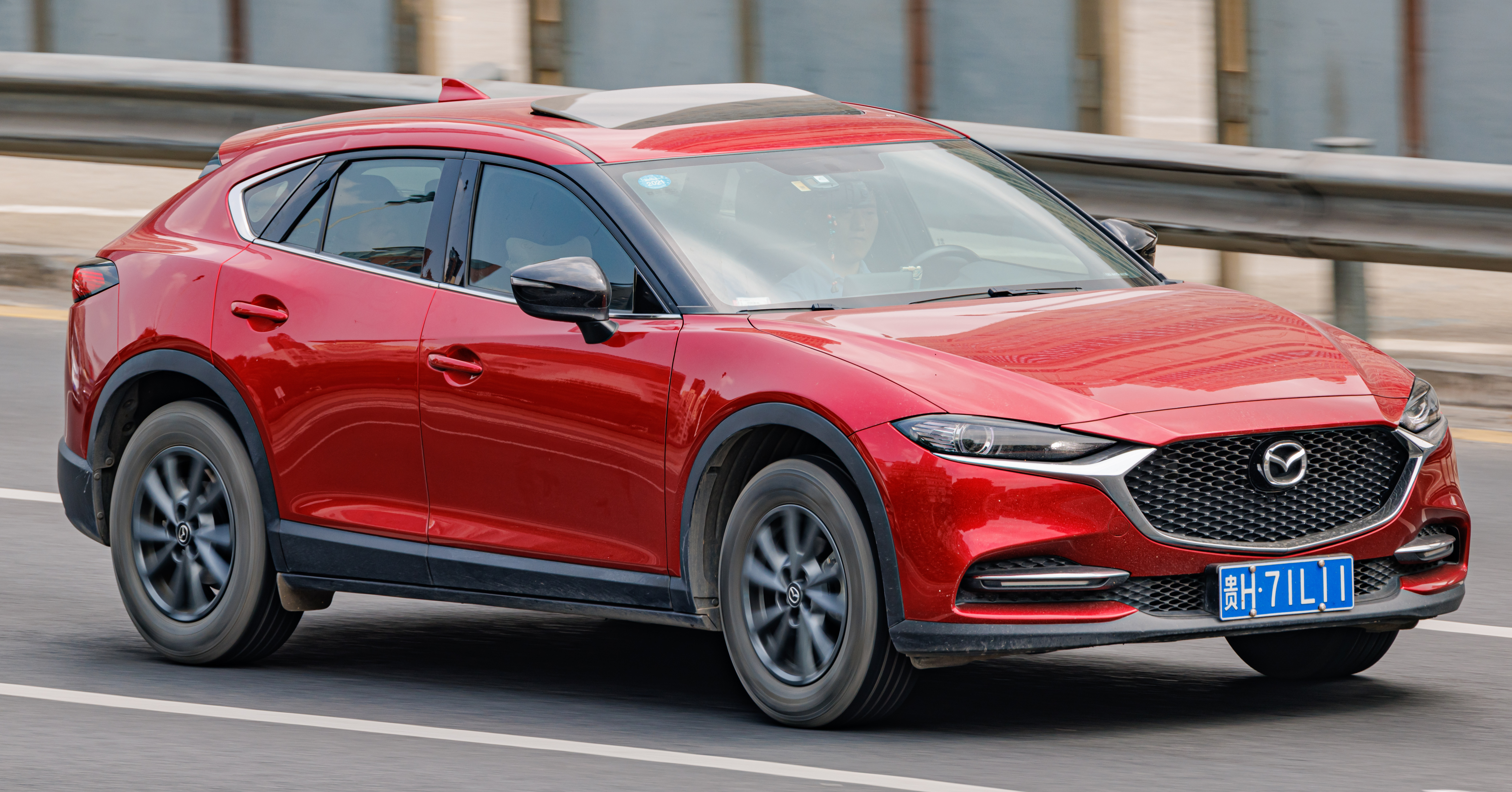
Mazda CX-4

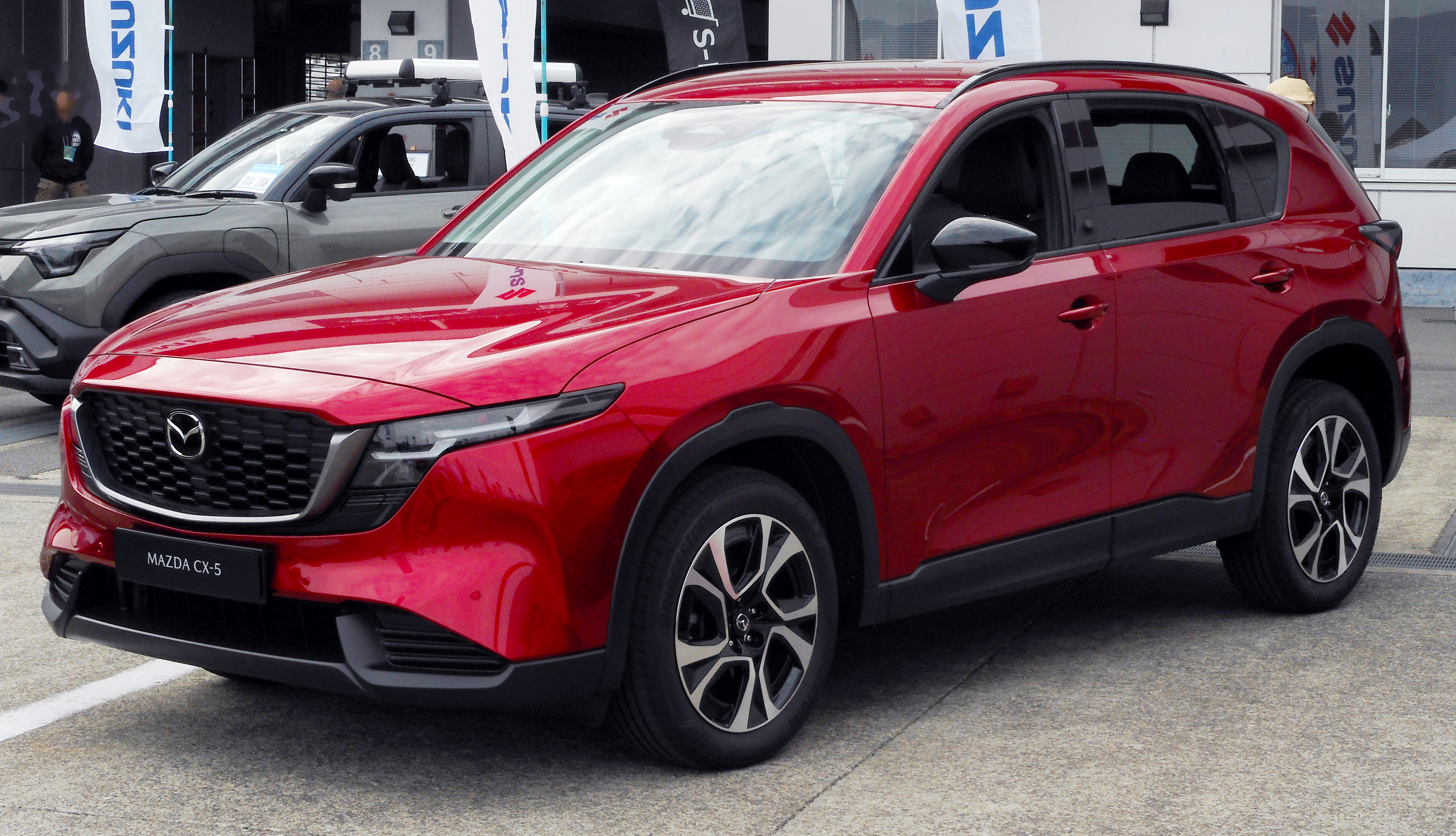
Mazda CX-5

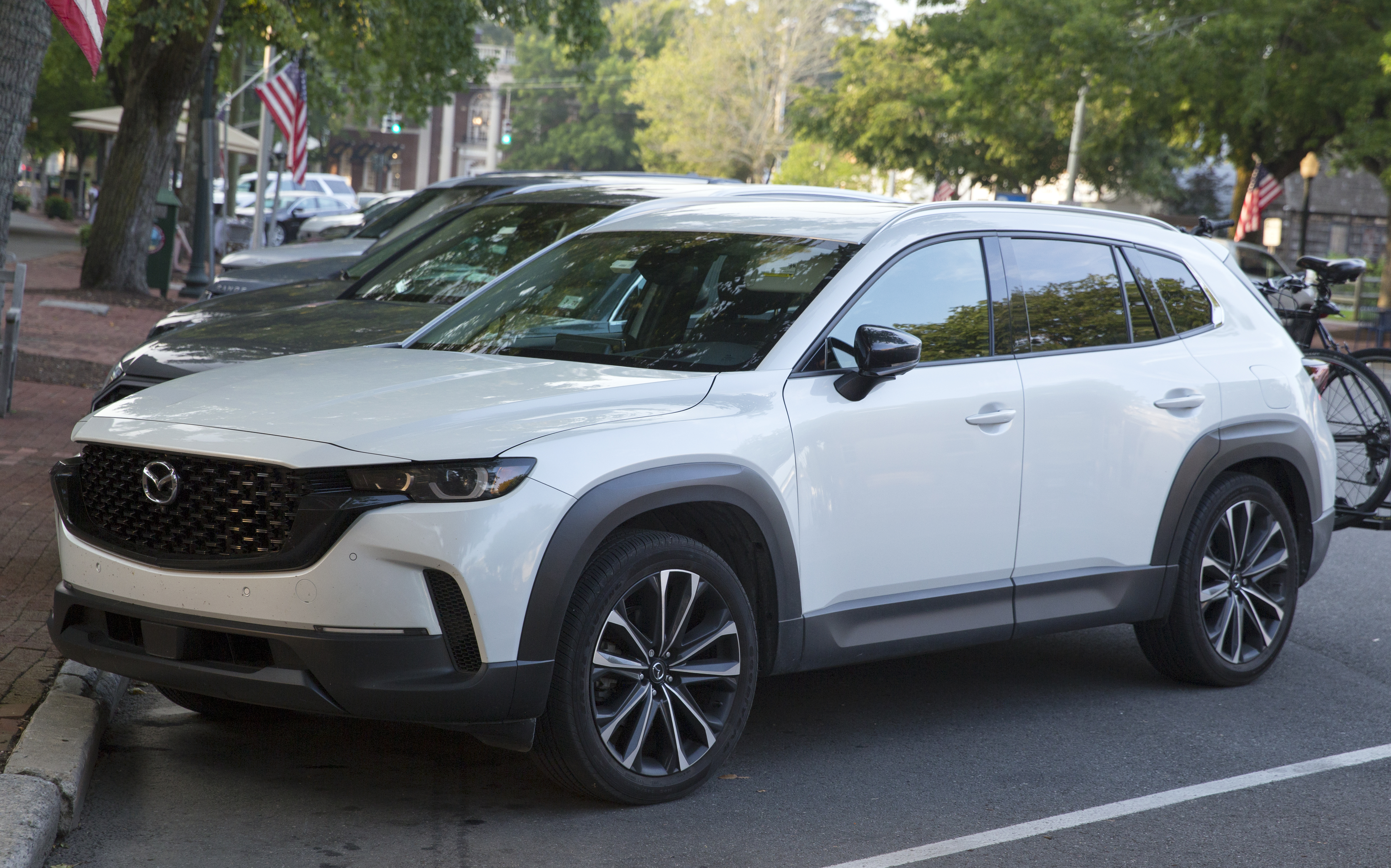
Mazda CX-50

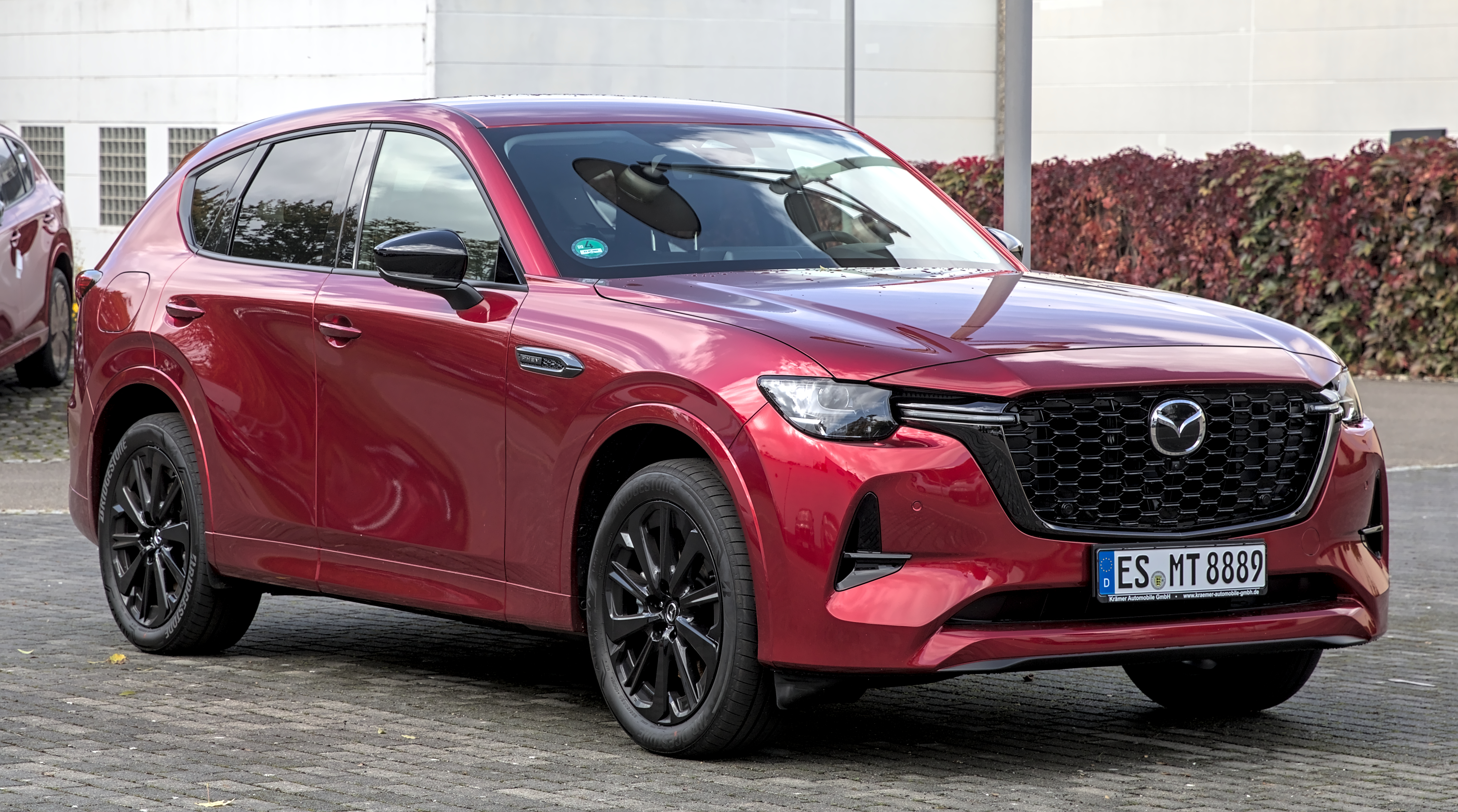
Mazda CX-60

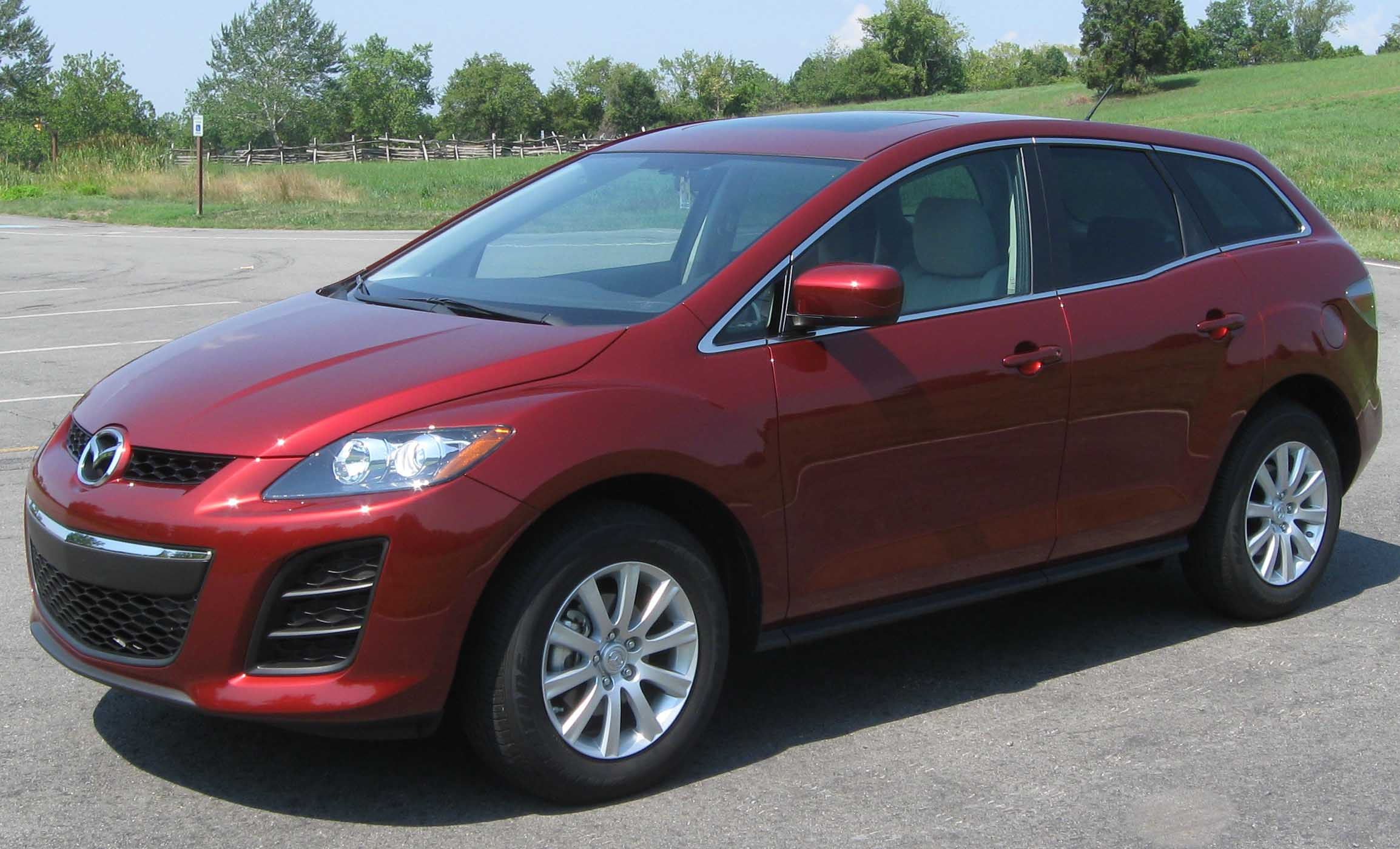
Mazda CX-7

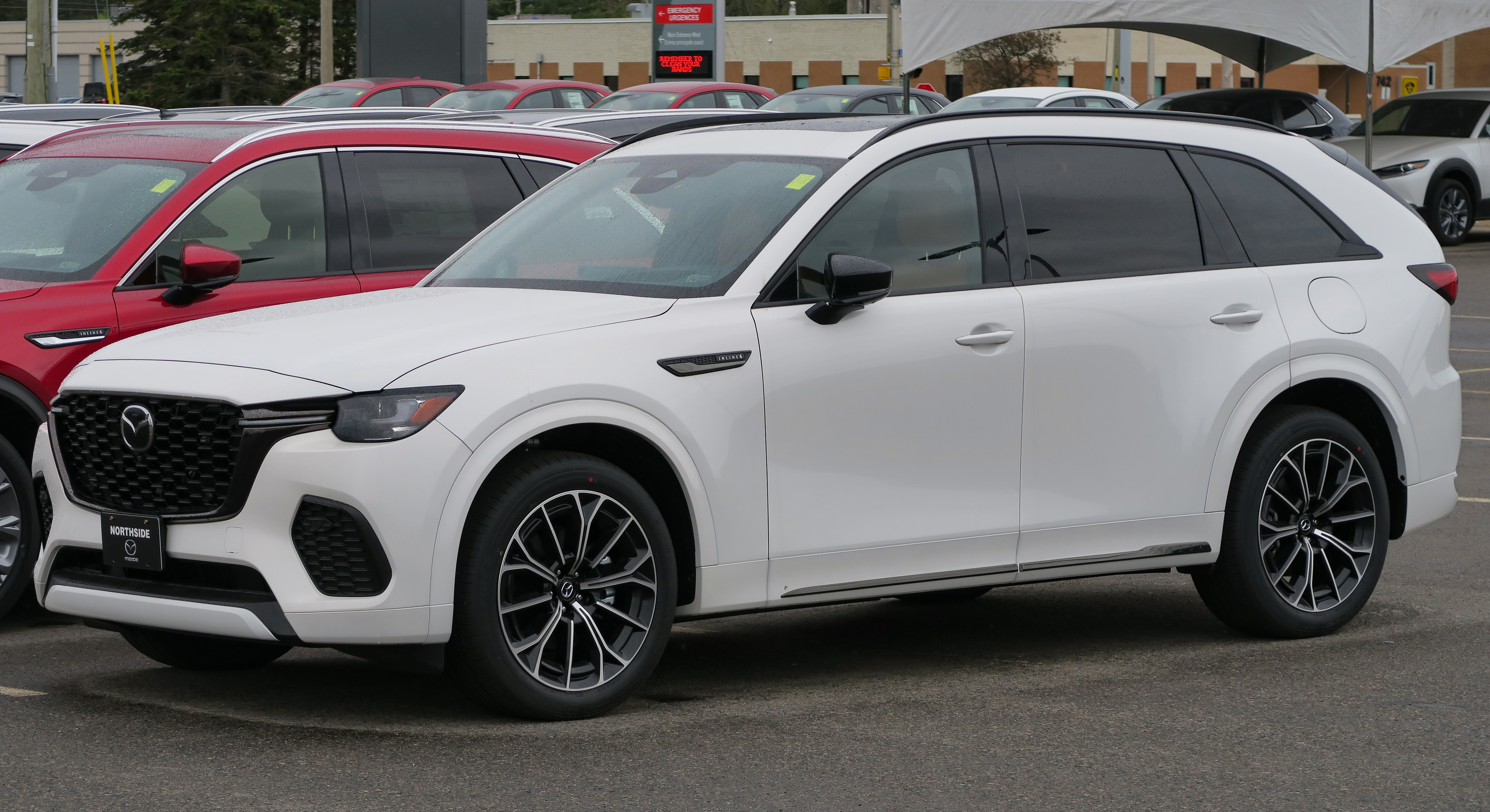
Mazda CX-70

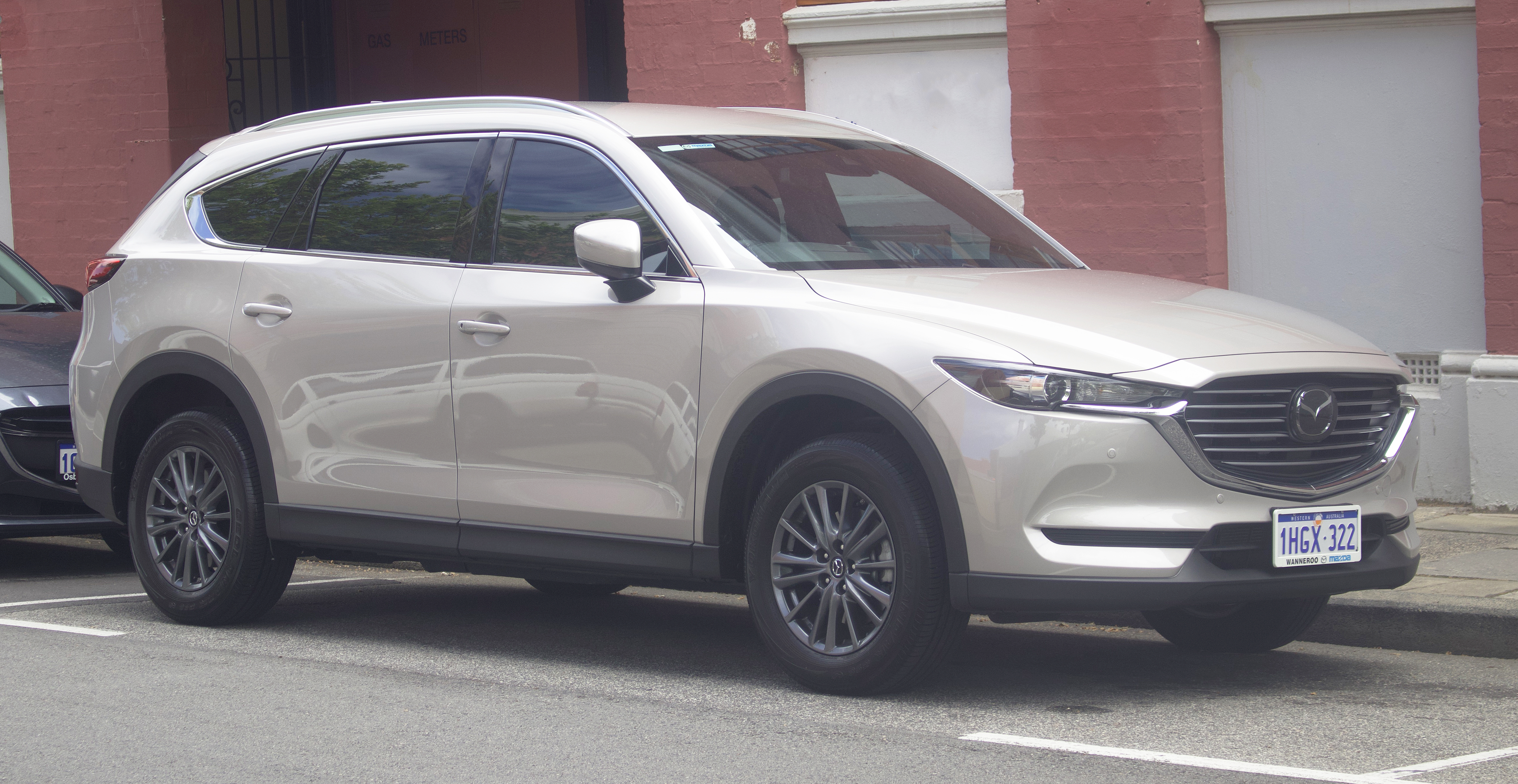
Mazda CX-8

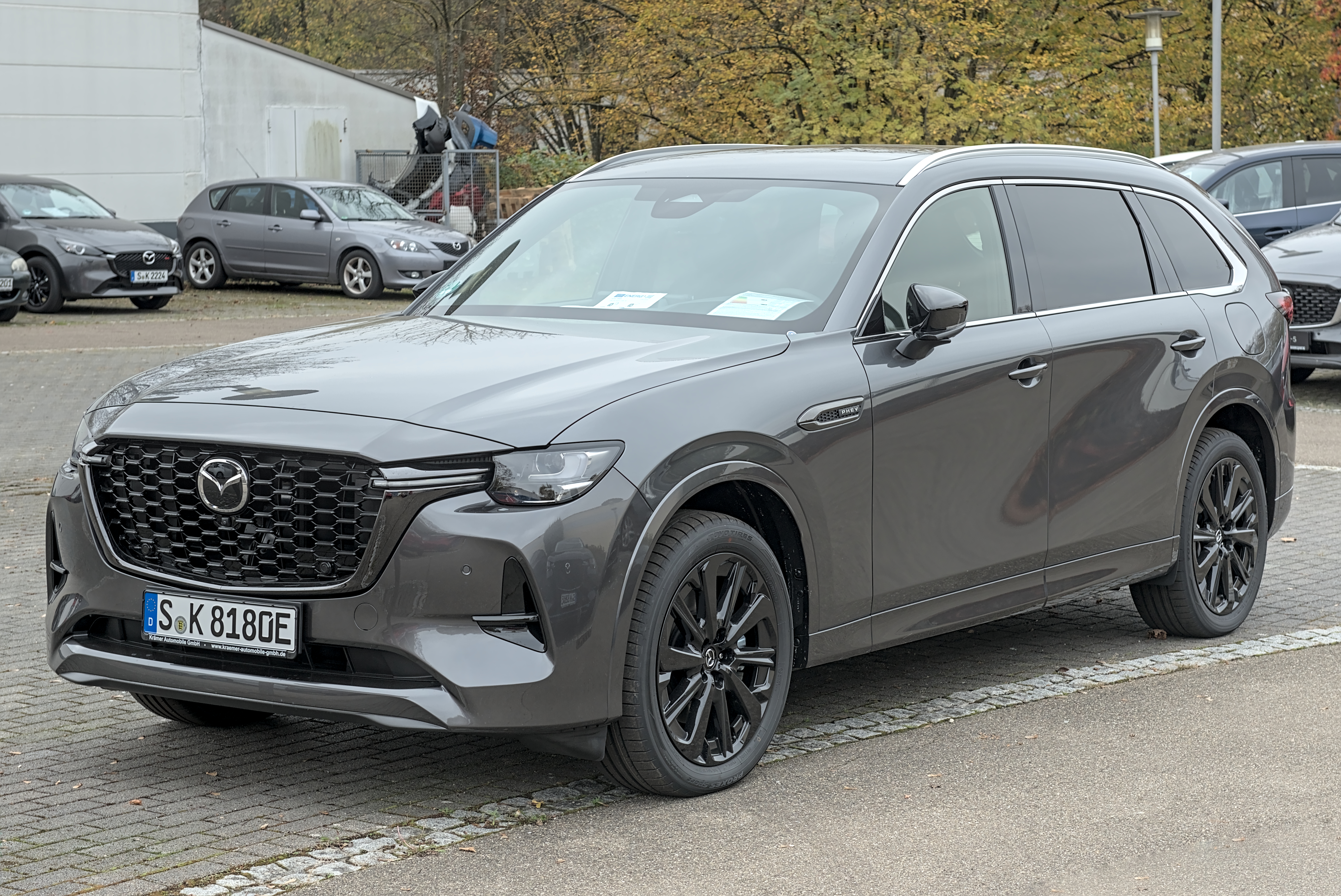
Mazda CX-80

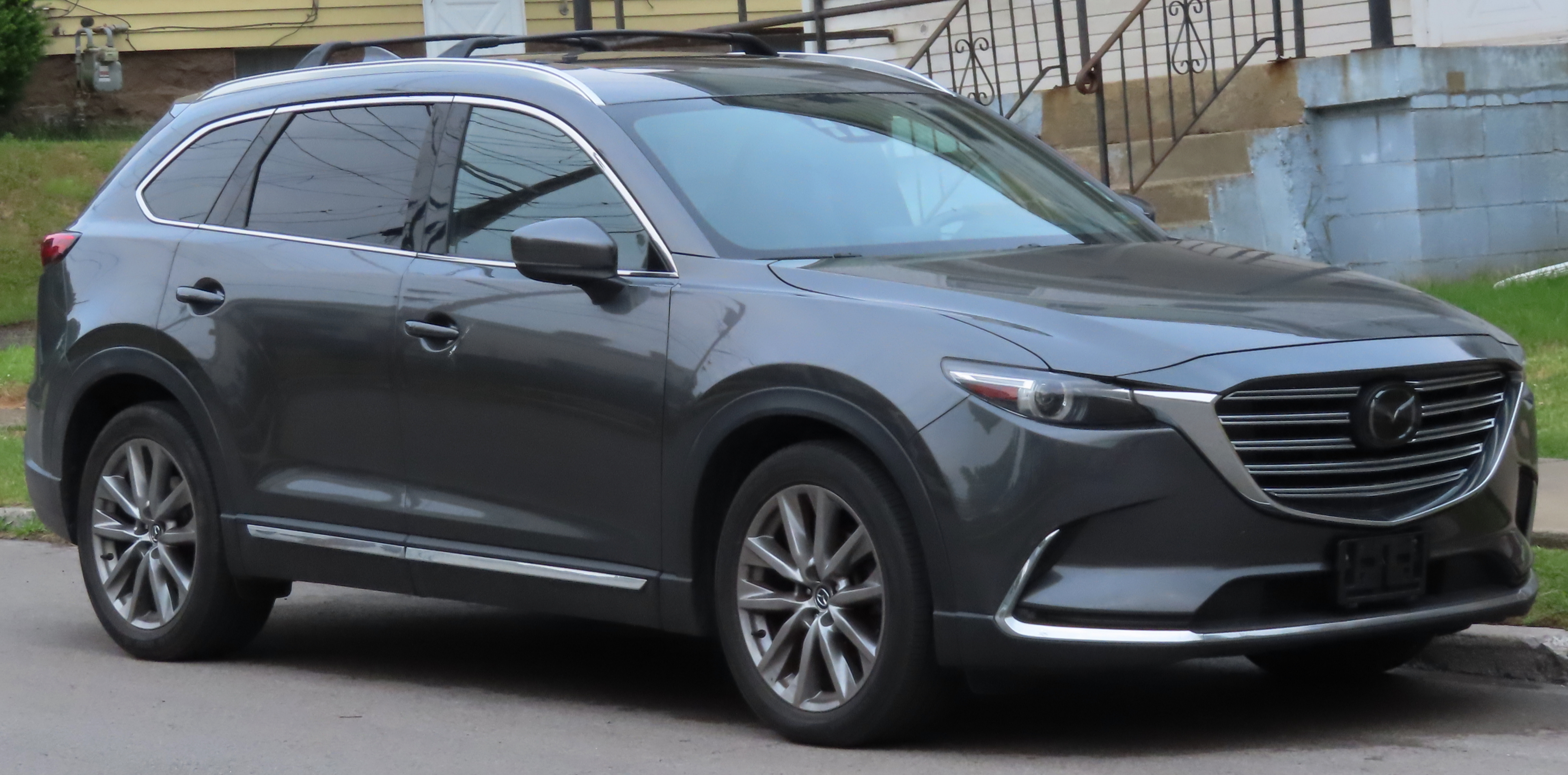
Mazda CX-9

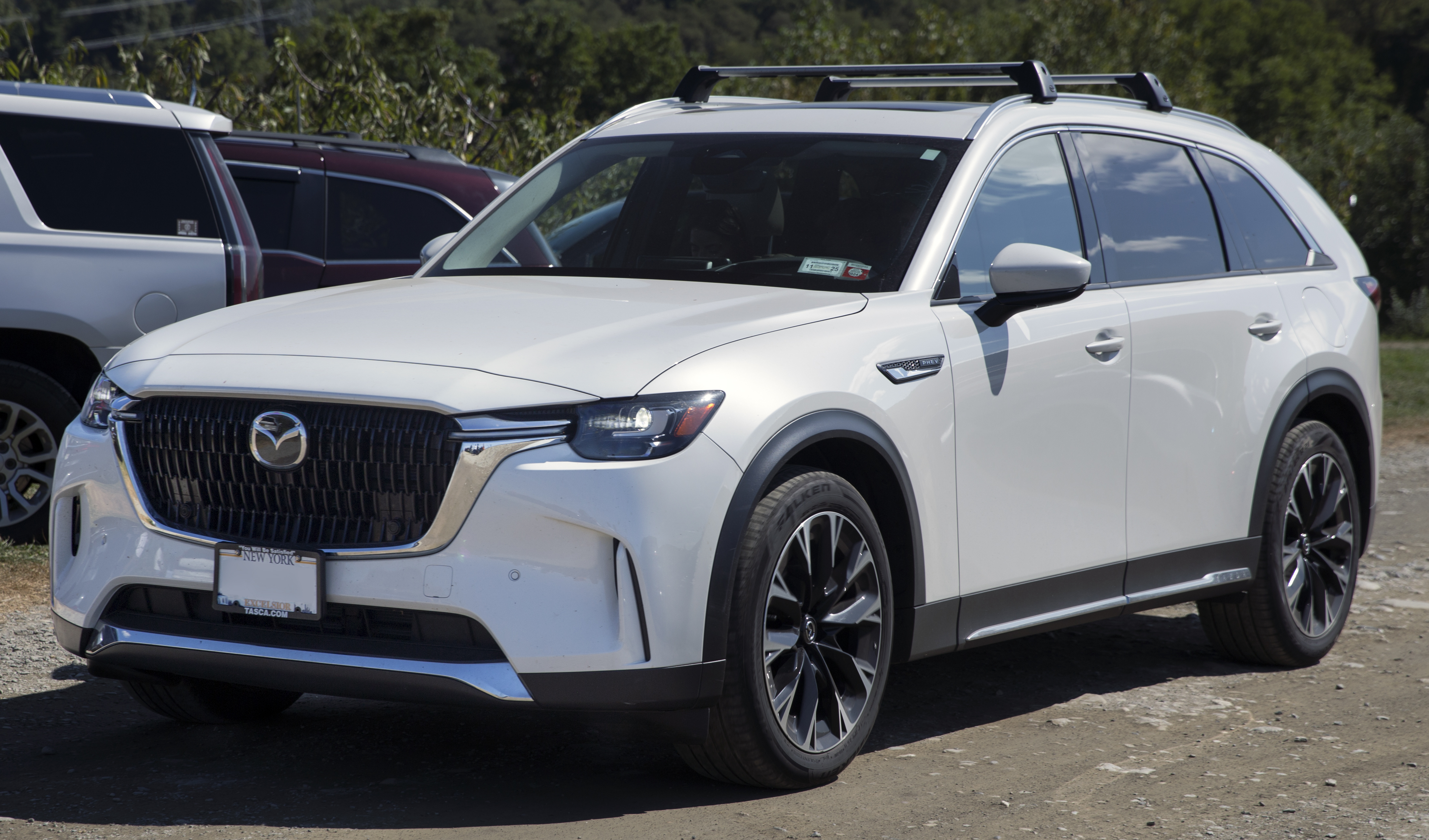
Mazda CX-90
