= Circumflex fibular artery =

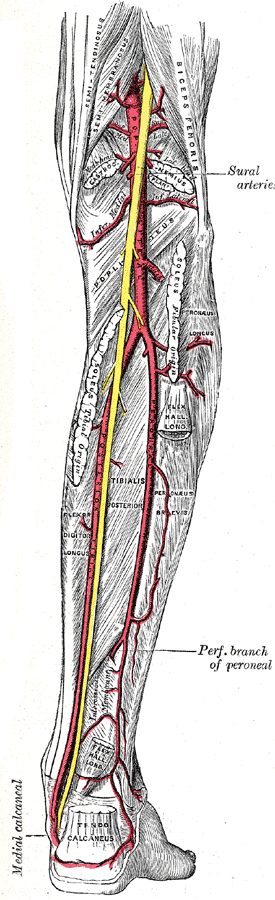
- Major arteries of the leg - posterior view (circumflex fibular artery is not labeled, but region is visible)

Details
- Source: Posterior tibial artery
- Supplies: Knee and some surrounding muscles

Identifiers
- Latin: ramus circumflexus fibularis arteriae tibialis posterioris
- TA98: A12.2.16.056
- TA2: 4722
- FMA: 43918

The circumflex fibular artery (circumflex fibular branch, circumflex branch of posterior tibial artery, or circumflex peroneal branch of posterior tibial artery) is a branch of the posterior tibial artery which supplies blood to the knee.

The artery branch of the anterior tibial artery, at its initial (or superior) segment, winds around the neck of the fibula and joins patellar network.
