= AD 120 =

120 in various calendars
- Gregorian calendar: 120; CXX
- Ab urbe condita: 873
- Assyrian calendar: 4870
- Balinese saka calendar: 41–42
- Bengali calendar: −474 – −473
- Berber calendar: 1070
- Buddhist calendar: 664
- Burmese calendar: −518
- Byzantine calendar: 5628–5629
- Chinese calendar: 己未年 (Earth Goat); 2817 or 2610 — to — 庚申年 (Metal Monkey); 2818 or 2611
- Coptic calendar: −164 – −163
- Discordian calendar: 1286
- Ethiopian calendar: 112–113
- Hebrew calendar: 3880–3881
- Hindu calendars
- Vikram Samvat: 176–177
- Shaka Samvat: 41–42
- Kali Yuga: 3220–3221
- Holocene calendar: 10120
- Iranian calendar: 502 BP – 501 BP
- Islamic calendar: 517 BH – 516 BH
- Javanese calendar: N/A
- Julian calendar: 120; CXX
- Korean calendar: 2453
- Minguo calendar: 1792 before ROC 民前1792年
- Nanakshahi calendar: −1348
- Seleucid era: 431/432 AG
- Thai solar calendar: 662–663
- Tibetan calendar: ས་མོ་ལུག་ལོ་ (female Earth-Sheep); 246 or −135 or −907 — to — ལྕགས་ཕོ་སྤྲེ་ལོ་ (male Iron-Monkey); 247 or −134 or −906

Year 120 (CXX) was a leap year starting on Sunday of the Julian calendar. At the time, it was known as the Year of the Consulship of Severus and Fulvus (or, less frequently, year 873 Ab urbe condita). The denomination 120 for this year has been used since the early medieval period, when the Anno Domini calendar era became the prevalent method in Europe for naming years.

== Events ==
=== By place ===
==== Roman Empire ====
- Emperor Hadrian visits Britain.
- Foss Dyke is constructed in Britain.
- A Kushan ambassadorial contingent visits with Hadrian.
- Suetonius becomes Hadrian's secretary ab epistolis.
- Approximate date
  - Legio IX Hispana last known to be in existence.
  - The Market Gate of Miletus is built at Miletos (moved in modern times to Staatliche Museen zu Berlin, Preußischer Kulturbesitz, Antikensammlung).

==== Asia ====
- Change of era name from Yuanchu (7th year) to Yongning of the Chinese Eastern Han dynasty.
- The Scythians dominate western India: Punjab, Sind, the north of Gujarat and a portion of central India.

== Births ==
- February 8 – Vettius Valens, Greek astrologer (d. 175)
- Irenaeus, Greek bishop and apologist (approximate date)
- Lucian, Syrian rhetorician and satirist (approximate date)
- Tatian, Syrian Christian writer and theologian (d. 180)

== Deaths ==
- Ban Zhao, Chinese historian and philosopher (b. AD 49)
- Dio Chrysostom, Greek historian (approximate date)
- Faustinus and Jovita, Roman Christian martyrs
- Getulius, Roman officer and Christian martyr
- Hermes, Greek Christian martyr and saint
- Marcian of Tortona, Roman bishop (or 117)
- Matthias of Jerusalem, bishop of Jerusalem
- Nicomachus, Greek mathematician (b. AD 60)
- Plutarch, Greek philosopher (approximate date)
- Sextus Pedius, Roman jurist (b. AD 50)
- Tacitus, Roman historian
