= Cisco Compatible EXtensions =

The Cisco Compatible Extensions (CCX) Specification describes a list of functional extensions to the IEEE 802.11 Wireless LAN standard to support fast roaming (CCKM) with upgraded security, reliability, and diagnostic performance. This specification is Cisco proprietary, and a device manufacturer requires a Cisco license agreement in order to develop mobile devices with this technology. Currently, CCX versions 4 (CCXv4) and 5 (CCXv5) are supported.

A working CCX network consists of one or more Cisco wireless access points, along with one or more CCX-enabled mobile devices.

CCX is typically deployed in industrial, enterprise, or institutional environments where 802.11 wireless connectivity or reliability is extremely important. Typical deployments include barcode scanners in a warehouse, VoIP mobile phones in an office environment, and wearable medical devices that report patient status.

The Cisco CCX license agreement does not include the software to actually implement CCX on a mobile device. Device makers will usually license CCX technology from an approved vendor.
