= C series =

C series or series C may refer to:

== Finance and business ==
- C Series Index, a consumer price index
- Series C, venture capital round debenture funding
- Series C banknotes, of Ireland

== Technology ==
- Sony Vaio C series, of laptops
- Sony Ericsson C series, a series of cell phones
- Toshiba Satellite C series, of laptops
- Compaq C series, handheld computers
- Convex Computer C series of vector minisupercomputers

== Transportation ==
- Bombardier C-Series, a family of airplanes, now renamed Airbus A220
- TNCA Series C, WWI Mexican fighter plane
- Transperth C-series train
- Opel Rekord Series C, executive car
- Chevrolet C series trucks, see Chevrolet C/K
- Chevrolet Series C Classic Six, including the Series C
- Ford C series, large trucks
- International C series, pickup trucks
- Isuzu C/E series, including C-series trucks
- Dodge C series, pickup trucks
- Daihatsu C-series engine

== Other uses ==
- QI (C series), a series of the TV quiz show QI
- C series, of ISO 216 paper sizes

== See also ==
- C (disambiguation)
- C class (disambiguation)
- Class C (disambiguation)
- C-size (disambiguation)
