= Ctypes =

Ctypes, ctype or another variant may refer to:

== Science ==
- C-type natriuretic peptide
- C-type lectin
- C-type star, or carbon star
- C-type asteroid

== Software ==
- ctypes, a form of language binding in Python and OCaml that can load C functions from shared libraries or DLLs on-the-fly
- ctype.h, a header in the ANSI C Standard Library for the C programming language that contains declarations for character classification functions

== Vehicles ==
- Audi Type C, roadster
- Citroën Type C, roadster
- Jaguar C-Type, racing sports car
- MG C-type, race car
- Auto Union Type C, Grand Prix race car
- Mercedes-Benz C-Class, sedan car
- Renault C-Type engine, straight-4 car engine
- C-type (New York City Subway car)
- Handley Page Type C, monoplane
- FBA Type C, reconnaissance flying boat
- Díaz Type C, fighter plane
- Sopwith Special torpedo seaplane Type C
- Caudron Navy Experimental Type C Trainer, trainer monoplane
- Consolidated Navy Experimental Type C Flying-Boat
- C class blimp or C type blimp
- Type C submarine of the Imperial Japanese Navy
- Type C escort ship of the Imperial Japanese Navy

== Other uses ==
- Type-C APS film, see APS-C
- Type C print, photographic print
- Type C connector, coaxial RF connector
- Type C videotape
- Type C ration or C-ration

== See also ==
- Class C (disambiguation)
- C class (disambiguation)
- C (disambiguation)
