= Type C2 submarine =

Type C2 submarine may refer to:

- I-46-class submarine, also called Type C2 submarine or Type C submarine Late production model (Junsen Hei-gata Kōki-gata), the 1st class submarine of the Imperial Japanese Navy
- Ha-3-class submarine, also called Type C2 submarine (C2-gata), the 3rd class submarine of the Imperial Japanese Navy

== See also ==
- C-class submarine (disambiguation)
