= C class =

C class may refer to:

== Ships ==
- C-class destroyer (disambiguation), multiple destroyers
- C-class submarine (disambiguation), multiple submarines
- C-class corvette (disambiguation), ships of the Victorian Royal Navy
- C-class cruiser, Royal Navy light cruisers built just before the First World War
- C-class ferry, Canadian ships
- C-class lifeboat, British lifeboats
- International C-class catamaran, sailing catamaran

== Rail vehicles ==
=== Australia ===
- C-class Melbourne tram
- C-class Sydney tram
- Commonwealth Railways C class, 4-6-0 passenger locomotives
- MRWA C class, 4-6-2 steam locomotives
- South Australian Railways C class, 2-4-0 steam locomotives
- Tasmanian Government Railways C class, 2-6-0 steam locomotives
- Victorian Railways C class, 2-8-0 steam locomotives
- Victorian Railways C class (diesel), diesel locomotives
- WAGR C class, axle load steam locomotives
- WAGR C class (1880), steam locomotives
- WAGR C class (diesel), diesel locomotives

=== Ireland ===
- CIÉ 201 Class, locomotives

=== New Zealand ===
- NZR C class (1873), tank locomotives
- NZR C class (1930), steam locomotives

=== United Kingdom ===
- LB&SCR C class, 0-6-0 freight steam locomotives
- LCDR C class, 2-4-0 steam locomotives
- LNWR Class C, 0-8-0 steam locomotives
- NBR C Class, 0-6-0 steam locomotive
- Metropolitan Railway C Class, 0-4-4T tank locomotives
- SECR C class, 0-6-0 locomotives

== Other uses ==
- C-class blimp, United States Navy blimp
- Mercedes-Benz C-Class, mid size passenger vehicle
- c-Class, a type of HP BladeSystem server computer
- C-segment, a European vehicle size class
- WikiProject#WikiProjects and assessments of article importance and quality, on Wikipedia
- C with Classes, an extension of the C programming language and the predecessor language to C++

== See also ==
- Class C (disambiguation)
- C (disambiguation)
- Class (disambiguation)
- C series (disambiguation)
