= Type C1 submarine =

Type C1 submarine may refer to:

- I-16-class submarine, also called Type C1 submarine or Type C submarine (Junsen Hei-gata), the 1st class submarine of the Imperial Japanese Navy
- Ha-1-class submarine, also called Type C1 submarine (C1-gata), the 3rd class submarine of the Imperial Japanese Navy

== See also ==
- C-class submarine (disambiguation)
