= C-size =

C-size may refer to:

- C series in paper size
- C cup size in bra size
- C battery

== See also ==
- Cizer, in Sălaj County, Romania
- sizeof function in C and C++ programming language
- C series (disambiguation)
