= Sony Vaio SZ series =

The SZ is a discontinued series of notebook computers from Sony introduced in mid-2006 to replace the S series. They fall into the ultraportable notebook class, with a 13.3" 16:10 ratio 1280x800 screen, and a weight from 1.69kg for the top model, which featured carbon fiber casing. The first models came with an Intel Core Duo Processor; in later models, this was replaced with an Intel Core 2 Duo.

All models came with a hybrid graphics system, which features an integrated GMA 950 graphics and an Nvidia GeForce Go 7400 (later replaced with GeForce 8400M) graphics and were the first to be able to switch between the two with a reboot of the system.

The chip-sets of SZ series have two basic modifications. There are different BIOS and chipset drivers available. The Napa chip-set line is installed in makes SZ1 to SZ4 and Santa Rosa is installed in SZ5 and up.

Most other hardware parts are gradually upgraded with increasing series number. Typically, the original drivers for advanced series are backward compatible with previous variants. Those drivers contain code for earlier hardware variants and can be installed instead of older driver packages. It is particularly useful since earlier series were not designed for Vista or Windows 7 OS. Sony download pages for earlier SZ series don't have drivers for these systems. All SZ series are capable to run Windows 7 OS if proper RAM and BIOS upgrades are performed.

SZ peripheral hardware contained: Bluetooth, WiFi, Landline modem, WLAN modem, Ethernet, Built-in web camera, memory card reader, fingerprint reader, audio, TPM module, Sony programmable IO module, ALPS touchpad.

The SZ series was superseded by the Z series (high-end, 13.1" screen) and SR series (lower cost, 13.3" screen) in 2008.
