= Sony Vaio C series =

Consumer notebook computers with various colors and graphics options

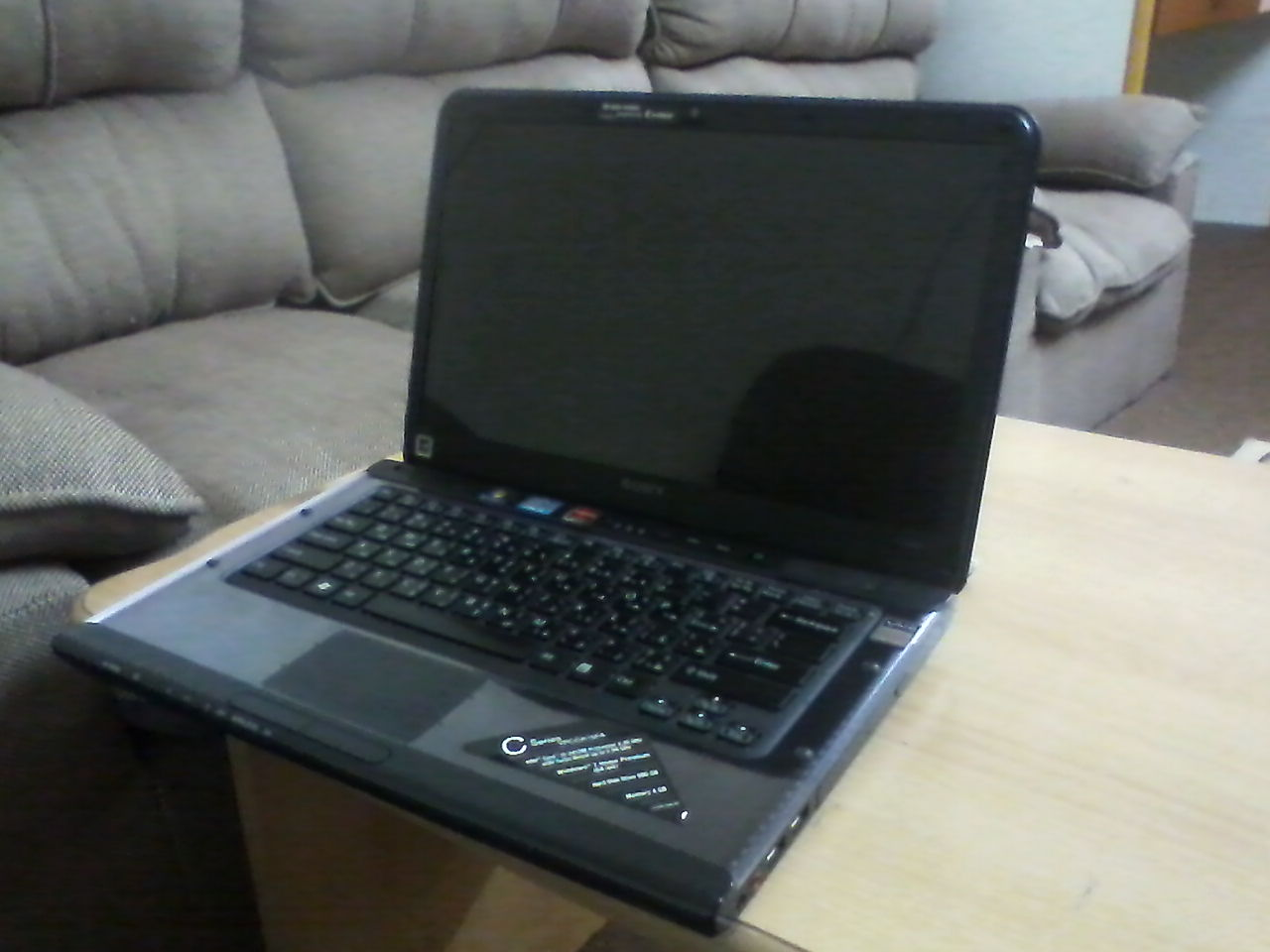
A black Sony Vaio C Series Laptop

The Sony Vaio C Series is a discontinued series of notebook computers from Sony introduced in September 2006 as the consumer alternative follow-up to the then current SZ series. They came with Windows 7 Home Premium 64-bit and 4GB of DDR3 ram, which could be upgraded to 8GB.

== History ==
Like the SZ, the first C series featured a 1280x800 (16:10 widescreen) 13.3" LCD screen, plus Core 2 Duo CPUs; later 15.5" models were released. As a consumer laptop, a variety of colors were offered, while compared with the SZ, the C series was heavier, and lacked the switchable graphics option, instead offering either lower-power Intel GMA 950 or faster Nvidia GeForce 7400 graphics. A crocodile-skin option was offered in Japan.

The C series was superseded by the SR series.

== Models ==
The 13" 2006 C series weighed 5.1 pounds/2.3kg.
