= Japanese Type 6 submarine =

Submarine class used 1906-1920

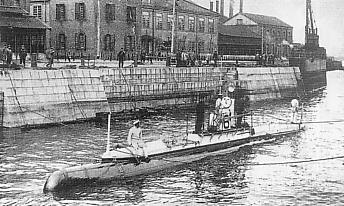
- Holland-type submarine No.6

Class overview
- Builders: Kawasaki Dockyards, Kobe
- Operators: Imperial Japanese Navy
- Preceded by: Kaigun Type 1 class
- Succeeded by: Ha-1 class
- In commission: 1906–1920
- Completed: 2
- Retired: 2

General characteristics
- Type: Submarine
- Displacement: Submarine No.6: 57 long tons (58 t) surfaced; 64 long tons (65 t) submerged; Submarine No.7: 78 long tons (79 t) surfaced; 95 long tons (97 t) submerged
- Length: 22.5 m (73 ft 10 in); 25.5 m (83 ft 8 in) (Submarine No.7)
- Beam: 2.1 m (6 ft 11 in) (Submarine No.6); 2.4 m (7 ft 10 in) (Submarine No.7)
- Draft: 2 m (6 ft 7 in) (Submarine No.6); 2.3 m (7 ft 7 in) (Submarine No.7)
- Installed power: 300 hp (220 kW) (gasoline engines); 22 hp (16 kW) (electric motors)
- Propulsion: Gasoline engines; Electric motors; 1 shaft
- Speed: 8.5 knots (15.7 km/h; 9.8 mph) surfaced; 4 knots (7.4 km/h; 4.6 mph) submerged
- Range: 184 nmi (341 km; 212 mi) at 8 knots (surfaced); 12 nmi (22 km; 14 mi) at 4 knots (submerged)
- Test depth: 30.5 metres (100 ft)
- Complement: 16 officers and enlisted
- Armament: 2 × 18 in (460 mm) bow torpedo tubes (2 × torpedoes)

The No.6-class submarine (第六型潜水艦, Dairoku-gata sensuikan) was the first class of submarines of the Imperial Japanese Navy built domestically in Japan. Consisting of two vessels, these submarines were highly modified versions of Holland-class vessels designed in the United States.

== Background ==
During the Russo-Japanese War, the Japanese government had purchased five modified Holland-class submarines from the Electric Boat Company's Fore River Shipyards in Quincy, Massachusetts. These vessels, known as the Type 1 class were delivered to Japan in knock-down form, and re-assembled at the Yokosuka Naval Arsenal. However, simultaneously, the Japanese government had obtained copies of the blueprints for the Holland-class submarines, and had assigned Kawasaki Dockyards in Kobe the task of building similar vessels in Japan.

== Construction and operational history ==
Kawasaki built two boats (Hulls No. 6 and 7), with the help of two American engineers, Chase and Herbert, who had been assistants to John Philip Holland. The Kawasaki-built submarines displaced 63 or 95 tons when submerged, and measured 73 or 84 feet in overall length, respectively, and were thus longer and displaced less than the original five imported Holland-type submarines which had arrived that same year. However, they had almost double the engine power, which gave extra speed and reduced fuel consumption. On the other hand, both vessels could launch only one 18-inch torpedo, and each was manned by 14 sailors, whereas the imported Holland-type submarines could fire two torpedoes and could be operated by 13 sailors.

The Kaigun Holland #6 was launched at Kobe on 28 September 1905 and was completed six months later at Kure as the first submarine built in Japan. It sank during a training dive in Hiroshima Bay on 15 April 1910. Although the water was only 58 feet deep, there were no provisions for the crew to escape while submerged. The commanding officer, Lieutenant Tsutomu Sakuma, patiently wrote a description of his sailor's efforts to bring the boat back to the surface as their oxygen supply ran out. All of the sailors were later found dead at their duty stations when this submarine was raised the following day. The sailors were regarded as heroes for their calm performance of their duties until death, and the submarine was preserved as a memorial in Kure Until it was dismantled by order of the SCAP in late 1945.

== Ships in class ==
- Japanese submarine No-6 (第六潜水艇, Dai-roku sensuikan), laid down 24 November 1904; launched 28 September 1905; commissioned 30 March 1906; reclassified as 2nd class submersible on 4 August 1916, reclassified as 3rd class submarine on 1 April 1919; decommissioned on 1 December 1920. Became a Memorial at Kure Naval Arsenal.
- Japanese submarine No-7 (第七潜水艇, Dai-nana sensuikan), laid down 26 November 1904; launched 28 September 1905; commissioned 30 March 1906; reclassified as 2nd class submersible on 4 August 1916, reclassified as 3rd class submarine on 1 April 1919; decommissioned on 1 December 1920.
