= C-class corvette =

C-class corvette may refer to vessels of the Victorian Royal Navy:

- Comus-class corvette, a nine-ship class launched between 1876 and 1879
- Calypso-class corvette, a two-vessel class of 1883–84

== See also ==
- C class (disambiguation)
