= C-class submarine =

C-class submarine may refer to:

- British C-class submarine, the last class of petrol-engined submarines of the Royal Navy
- Japanese Type C 1st class submarine, two classes of submarines of the Imperial Japanese Navy:
  - Type C submarine
  - I-52-class submarine (Type C3 submarine)
- Japanese Type C 3rd class submarine, three classes of submarines of the Imperial Japanese Navy:
  - Ha-1-class submarine (Type C1 submarine)
  - Ha-3-class submarine (Type C2 submarine)
  - Ha-7-class submarine (Type C3 submarine)
- Spanish C-class submarine, six submarines of the Spanish Navy
- United States C-class submarine, five submarines of the United States Navy
