= Ha-7-class submarine =

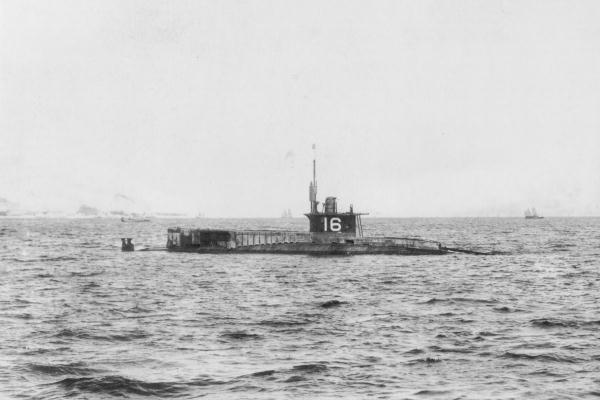
- Japanese submarine Ha-7, in trials off Kure, 1916

Class overview
- Builders: Kure Naval Arsenal, Japan
- Operators: Imperial Japanese Navy
- Preceded by: Ha-3 class
- Succeeded by: Kaichū type
- In commission: 1916–1929
- Completed: 2
- Retired: 2

General characteristics
- Type: Submarine
- Displacement: 286 long tons (291 t) surfaced; 321 long tons (326 t) submerged
- Length: 43.3 m (142 ft 1 in)
- Beam: 4.14 m (13 ft 7 in)
- Draft: 3.43 m (11 ft 3 in)
- Installed power: 600 hp (450 kW) (gasoline engines); 300 hp (220 kW) (electric motors)
- Propulsion: Gasoline engines; Electric motors; 1 shaft
- Speed: 12 knots (22 km/h; 14 mph) surfaced; 7 knots (13 km/h; 8.1 mph) submerged
- Range: 660 nmi (1,220 km; 760 mi) at 12 knots (surfaced); 60 nmi (110 km; 69 mi) at 8.5 knots (15.7 km/h; 9.8 mph) (submerged)
- Test depth: 30.5 m (100 ft)
- Complement: 26 officers and enlisted
- Armament: 4 × 18 in (460 mm) bow torpedo tubes (4 × torpedoes); 1 × machine gun

The Ha-7-class submarine (波七型潜水艦, Ha-nana-gata sensuikan) was an early class of submarines of the Imperial Japanese Navy. It was also called the "Vickers C-3 class".

== Background ==
A final two vessels of the British C-class submarine design were built completely in Japan by the Kure Naval Arsenal as part of the emergency expansion of the Imperial Japanese Navy due to World War I. Although the design was considered obsolete by this time, these vessels were felt necessary to meet the perceived threat of German submarine activity in Japanese coastal waters. Physically almost identical to the Ha-3 class, the two vessels incorporated a number of improvements, including a change in the location of the rudder for better control, and the addition of two externally mounted torpedo tubes to double the attack capability from previous designs. Arriving in Japan during the closing stages of the war, neither vessel was ever used in combat.

== Ships in class ==
- Japanese submarine Ha-7 (波号第七潜水艦, Ha-go Dai-nana sensuikan), laid down 8 January 1916; launched 15 March 1916; commissioned 31 October 1916 as 2nd Class Submersible No.16; reclassified as 3rd class submarine on 1 April 1919; renamed Ha-7 on 15 June 1923, decommissioned on 1 December 1929.
- Japanese submarine Ha-8 (波号第八潜水艦, Ha-go Dai-hachi sensuikan), laid down 8 January 1916; launched 15 March 1916; commissioned 20 February 1917 as 2nd Class Submersible No.17; reclassified as 3rd class submarine on 1 April 1919; renamed Ha-8 on 15 June 1923; decommissioned on 1 December 1929.
