= Class C =

Class C may refer to:

- Class-C amplifier, a category of electronic amplifier
- Class C (baseball), a defunct class in minor league baseball in North America
- Class C stellar classification for a carbon star
- Class C drugs, under the Misuse of Drugs Act (disambiguation) of multiple Commonwealth Nations
  - Class C drug, as defined by the UK's Misuse of Drugs Act 1971
- Class C network, a type of IP address on a Classful network
- Class C, an airspace class as defined by the ICAO
- Class C, a type of driver's license in the United States
- Class C, a large goods vehicle driving licence in the United Kingdom and European driving licence
- Class C, from the List of North American broadcast station classes
- Class C, a type of smooth function in mathematics
- Class C motorhome, a type of recreational vehicle which has a bed over the driver's cab

== See also ==
- C class (disambiguation)
- C (disambiguation)
- Class (disambiguation)
- C series (disambiguation)
