= C-class destroyer =

C-class destroyer may refer to:

- C-class destroyer (1913), a class of Royal Navy destroyers launched from 1894 to 1901
- C and D-class destroyer, a class of Royal Navy destroyers, some served with the Royal Canadian Navy in World War II
- C-class destroyer (1943), a class of Royal Navy destroyers launched from 1943–1945
