= Toshiba Satellite C series =

Budget consumer line of satellite laptops

Satellite C series

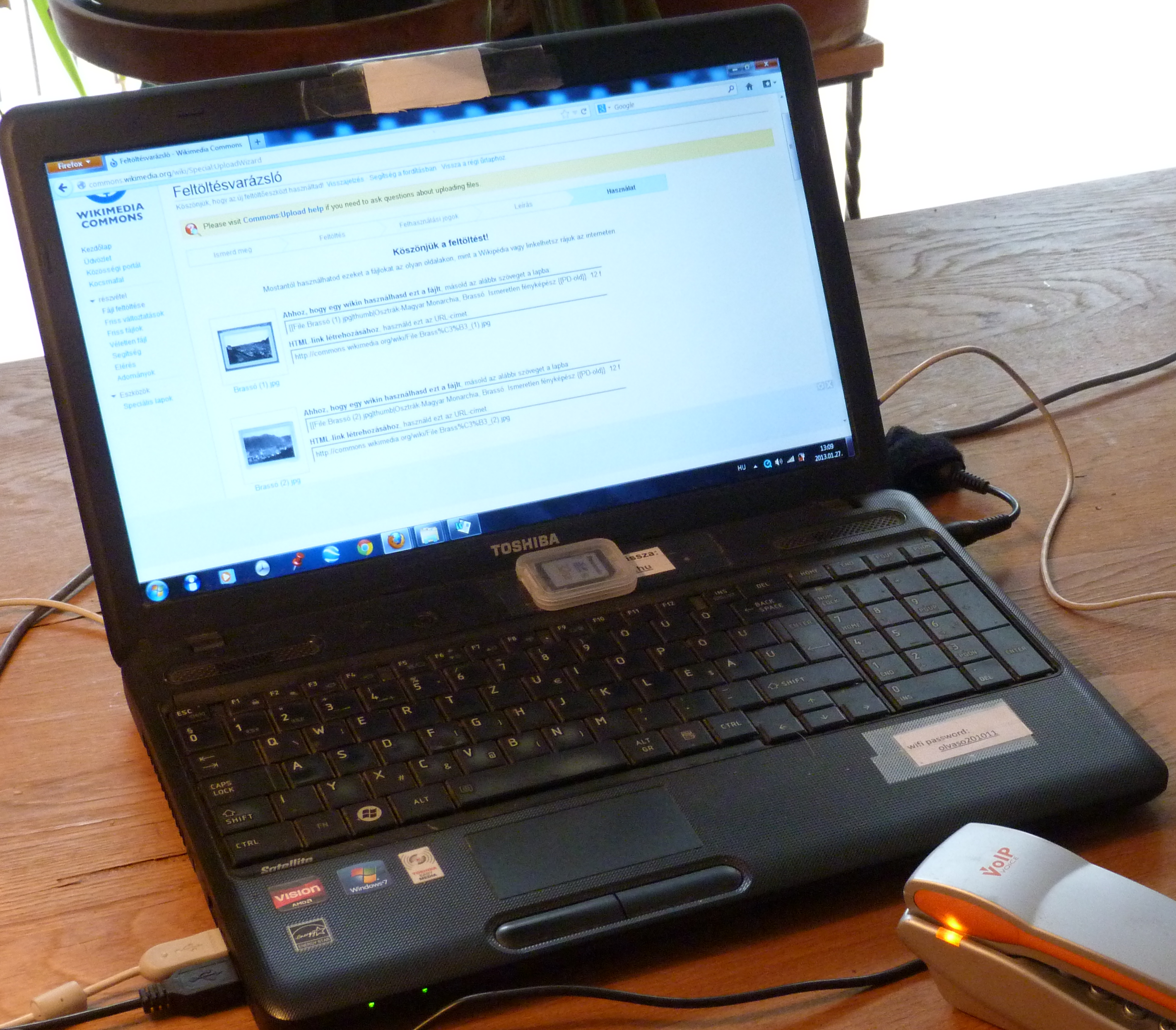
- Satellite C650
- Developer: Toshiba Information Systems Corporation (2010–2016)
- Type: Consumer laptop

The Satellite C series was Toshiba Information Systems's budget consumer line of Satellite laptops. Screen sizes on the C series ranged between 14 and 17-inches diagonally; the laptops were offered with Intel or AMD processors.

The series was introduced in late 2010 with the C655, which retailed for $398 and featured an AMD Fusion processor. The C655 was compared to the then-popular netbooks of the period in terms of having slower processors and lower-capacity hard disk drives. Early entries in the series were basic affairs with matte plastic finishes; in 2015 Toshiba began introducing C-Series Satellites with resin finishes imitating the look of stainless steel, included Skullcandy-manufactured speakers, and were optioned with touchscreen displays.

Toshiba discontinued the Satellite C series in 2016 along with the entire Satellite line of laptops.

== Models ==
Toshiba Satellite C series models
Model no.	Display	Processor	Chipset	Clock speed (GHz)	Graphics	RAM	Storage	Networking	Audio	Operating system	Toshiba datasheet
C45-A4112WL	14" TFT TruBrite with 1366 x 768 native resolution (HD)	Intel Celeron 1037U	Mobile Intel Series 7 Express	1.80	Mobile Intel HD Graphics	4 GB DDR3 @ 1600 MHz (max. 16 GB)	500 GB (5400 RPM) Serial ATA HDD	Ethernet 10/100; Wi-Fi Wireless (802.11b/g/n) LAN; Bluetooth V4.0	Built-in stereo speakers with DTS Sound	Windows 8.1	C45-A4112WL
C45-A4113WL	14" TFT TruBrite with 1366 x 768 native resolution (HD)	Intel Celeron 1037U	Mobile Intel Series 7 Express	1.80	Mobile Intel HD Graphics	4 GB DDR3 @ 1600 MHz (max. 16 GB)	500 GB (5400 RPM) Serial ATA HDD	Ethernet 10/100; Wi-Fi Wireless (802.11b/g/n) LAN; Bluetooth V4.0	Built-in stereo speakers with DTS Sound	Windows 8.1	C45-A4113WL
C45-A4114FL	14" TFT TruBrite with 1366 x 768 native resolution (HD)	Intel Core i3-3110M	Mobile Intel Series 7 Express	2.40	Mobile Intel HD Graphics	4 GB DDR3 @ 1600 MHz (max. 16 GB)	500 GB (5400 RPM) Serial ATA HDD	Ethernet 10/100; Wi-Fi Wireless (802.11b/g/n) LAN; Bluetooth V4.0	Built-in stereo speakers with DTS Sound	Windows 8.1	C45-A4114FL
C45-A4115FL		Intel Core i5-4200M	Mobile Intel Series 8 Express	3.10	Mobile Intel HD Graphics	6 GB DDR3 @ 1600 MHz (max. 16 GB)	750 GB (5400 RPM) Serial ATA HDD	Ethernet 10/100; Wi-Fi Wireless (802.11b/g/n) LAN; Bluetooth V4.0	Built-in stereo speakers with DTS Sound		C45-A4115FL
C45-A4116FL		Intel Core i5-4200M	Mobile Intel Series 8 Express	3.10	Mobile Intel HD Graphics	4 GB DDR3 @ 1600 MHz (max. 16 GB)	500 GB (5400 RPM) Serial ATA HDD	Ethernet 10/100; Wi-Fi Wireless (802.11b/g/n) LAN; Bluetooth V4.0	Built-in stereo speakers with DTS Sound		C45-A4116FL
C50-ABT2N11		Intel Celeron 1005M	Mobile Intel HM76 Express	1.80		2 GB DDR3	320 GB (5400 RPM) Serial ATA HDD				C50-ABT2N11
C50-ABT2N12		Intel Celeron 1005M	Mobile Intel HM76 Express	1.90		2 GB DDR3	320 GB (5400 RPM) Serial ATA HDD				C50-ABT2N12
C50-ASMBNX3		Intel Core i5-3230 with Turbo Boost Technology	Mobile Intel HM76 Express	3.20		4 GB DDR3 @ 1600 MHz (max. 16 GB)	750 GB (5400 RPM) Serial ATA HDD				C50-ASMBNX3
C50-ASMBNX4		Intel Celeron 1005M		1.80		4 GB DDR3 @ 1600 MHz (max. 16 GB)	500 GB (5400 RPM) Serial ATA HDD			Windows 7 Professional (Windows 8.1 Pro license and recovery media included)	C50-ASMBNX4
C50-ASMBNX5		Intel Core i3-3110		2.40		4 GB DDR3 @ 1600 MHz (max. 16 GB)	500 GB (5400 RPM) Serial ATA HDD				C50-ASMBNX5
C50-ASMBNX6		Intel Core i5-3230 with Turbo Boost Technology		3.20		4 GB DDR3 @ 1600 MHz (max. 16 GB)	750 GB (5400 RPM) Serial ATA HDD				C50-ASMBNX6
C50-AST3NX1		Intel Celeron 1005M	Mobile Intel Series 7 Express	1.80		4 GB DDR3 @ 1600 MHz (max. 16 GB)	500 GB (5400 RPM) Serial ATA HDD				C50-AST3NX1
C50-AST3NX2		Intel Core i3-3110		2.40		4 GB DDR3 @ 1600 MHz (max. 16 GB)	750 GB (5400 RPM) Serial ATA HDD				C50-AST3NX2
C50-AST3NX4		Intel Core i3-3110		2.40		6 GB DDR3 @ 1600 MHz (max. 16 GB)	500 GB (5400 RPM) Serial ATA HDD				C50-AST3NX4
C50-BBT2N12		Intel Celeron N2840	Mobile Intel HM76 Express	2.58		4 GB DDR3	500 GB (5400 RPM) Serial ATA HDD				C50-BBT2N12
C50-CBT2N11		Intel Celeron N3050		2.16		4 GB DDR3L	500 GB (5400 RPM) Serial ATA HDD				C50-CBT2N11
C50D-ABT2N11		AMD E1-1200 Dual-Core	AMD A68M	1.40	AMD Radeon HD 7310	2 GB DDR3	320 GB (5400 RPM) Serial ATA HDD				C50D-ABT2N11
C50D-ABT3N11		AMD E1-2100		1.00	AMD Radeon HD 8210	4 GB DDR3	500 GB (5400 RPM) Serial ATA HDD				C50D-ABT3N11
C50D-AST2NX1		AMD E1-1200 Dual-Core	AMD A68M	1.40	AMD Radeon HD 7310	4 GB DDR3 @ 1066 MHz (max. 16 GB)	500 GB (5400 RPM) Serial ATA HDD				C50D-AST2NX1
C50D-AST3NX3		AMD A4-5000 Quad-Core		1.50	AMD Radeon HD 8330	4 GB DDR3 @ 1333 MHz (max. 16 GB)	500 GB (5400 RPM) Serial ATA HDD				C50D-AST3NX3
C55-A5100		Intel Core i3-3120M	Mobile Intel HM76 Express	2.50	Mobile Intel HD Graphics	6 GB DDR3 @ 1600 MHz (max 16 GB)	750 GB (5400 RPM) Serial ATA HDD				C55-A5100
C55-A5104		Intel Celeron N2820		2.39	Intel HD Graphics	4 GB DDR3L @ 1333 MHz (max 8 GB)	500 GB (5400 RPM) Serial ATA HDD				C55-A5104
C55-A5126		Intel Pentium 2020M	Mobile Intel HM70 Express	2.40	Mobile Intel HD Graphics	4 GB DDR3 @ 1333 MHz (max. 16 GB)					C55-A5126
C55-A5166		Intel Core i3-3110M	Mobile Intel HM76 Express	2.40	Mobile Intel HD Graphics						C55-A5166
C55-A5172		Intel Core i3-4000M	Mobile Intel HM86 Express	2.40	Mobile Intel HD Graphics						C55-A5172
C55-A5182		Intel Core i3-4000M	Mobile Intel HM86 Express	2.40	Mobile Intel HD Graphics						C55-A5182
C55-A5195		Intel Core i3-3110M	Mobile Intel HM76 Express	2.40	Mobile Intel HD Graphics						C55-A5195
C55-A5204		Intel Core i3-3120M	Mobile Intel HM76 Express	2.50	Mobile Intel HD Graphics						C55-A5204
C55-A5220		Intel Celeron 1037U	Mobile Intel NM70 Express	1.80	Mobile Intel HD Graphics						C55-A5220
C55-A5242		Intel Celeron 1037U	Mobile Intel NM70 Express	1.80	Mobile Intel HD Graphics						C55-A5242
C55-A5243NR		Intel Pentium 2020M	Mobile Intel HM76 Express	2.40	Mobile Intel HD Graphics						C55-A5243NR
C55-A5245		Intel Core i3-3110M	Mobile Intel HM76 Express	2.40	Mobile Intel HD Graphics						C55-A5245
C55-A5246NR		Intel Core i3-3120M	Mobile Intel HM76 Express	2.50	Mobile Intel HD Graphics						C55-A5246NR
C55-A5246		Intel Core i3-2348M	Mobile Intel HM76 Express	2.30	Mobile Intel HD Graphics						C55-A5246
C55-A5249		Intel Celeron 1037U	Mobile Intel NM70 Express	1.80	Mobile Intel HD Graphics						C55-A5249
C55-A5281		Intel Pentium 2020M	Mobile Intel HM70 Express	2.40	Mobile Intel HD Graphics						C55-A5281
C55-A5282		Intel Pentium 2020M	Mobile Intel HM70 Express	2.40	Mobile Intel HD Graphics						C55-A5282
C55-A5285		Intel Core i3-3120M	Mobile Intel HM76 Express	2.50	Mobile Intel HD Graphics						C55-A5285
C55-A5286		Intel Core i3-3120M	Mobile Intel HM76 Express	2.50	Mobile Intel HD Graphics						C55-A5286
C55-A5300		Intel Celeron 1037U	Mobile Intel NM70 Express	1.80	Mobile Intel HD Graphics						C55-A5300
C55-A5311		Intel Core i3-3120M	Mobile Intel HM76 Express	2.50	Mobile Intel HD Graphics						C55-A5311
C55-A5330		Intel Core i3-3110M	Mobile Intel HM76 Express	2.40	Mobile Intel HD Graphics						C55-A5330
C55-A5332		Intel Core i5-3230M with Intel Turbo Boost Technology	Mobile Intel HM76 Express	3.20	Mobile Intel HD Graphics						C55-A5332
C55-A5347		Intel Core i3-3110M	Mobile Intel HM76 Express	2.40	Mobile Intel HD Graphics						C55-A5347
C55-A5369		Intel Core i3-3110M	Mobile Intel HM76 Express	2.40	Mobile Intel HD Graphics						C55-A5369
C55-A5384		Intel Core i3-3120M	Mobile Intel HM76 Express	2.50	Mobile Intel HD Graphics						C55-A5384
C55-A5386		Intel Core i3-3120M	Mobile Intel HM76 Express	2.50	Mobile Intel HD Graphics						C55-A5386
C55-A5388		Intel Core i3-3110M	Mobile Intel HM76 Express	2.40	Mobile Intel HD Graphics						C55-A5388
C55-A5390		Intel Core i3-3110M	Mobile Intel HM76 Express	2.40	Mobile Intel HD Graphics						C55-A5390
C55-B5100		Intel Celeron N2840		2.58	Mobile Intel HD Graphics						C55-B5100
C55D-A5107		AMD A6-5200 Quad-Core		2.00	AMD Radeon HD 8400						C55D-A5107
C55D-A5120		AMD E2-3800 Quad-Core		1.30	AMD Radeon HD 8280						C55D-A5120
C55D-A5146		AMD A4-5000 Quad-Core		1.50	AMD Radeon HD 8330						C55D-A5146
C55D-A5150		AMD A6-5200 Quad-Core		2.00	AMD Radeon HD 8400						C55D-A5150
C55D-A5175		AMD A6-5200 Quad-Core		2.00	AMD Radeon HD 8400						C55D-A5175
C55D-A5201		AMD E1-1200 Dual-Core	AMD A68M	1.40	AMD Radeon HD 7310						C55D-A5201
C55D-A5206		AMD A4-5000 Quad-Core		1.50	AMD Radeon HD 8330						C55D-A5206
C55D-A5208		AMD A6-5200 Quad-Core		2.00	AMD Radeon HD 8400						C55D-A5208
C55D-A5240NR		AMD E1-1200 Dual-Core	AMD A68M	1.40	AMD Radeon HD 7310						C55D-A5240NR
C55D-A5240		AMD E1-1200 Dual-Core	AMD A68M	1.40	AMD Radeon HD 7310						C55D-A5240
C55D-A5333		AMD A6-5200 Quad-Core		2.00	AMD Radeon HD 8400						C55D-A5333
C55D-A5340		AMD E1-1200 Dual-Core	AMD A68M	1.40	AMD Radeon HD 7310						C55D-A5340
C55D-A5346		AMD A4-5000 Quad-Core		1.50	AMD Radeon HD 8330						C55D-A5346
C55D-A5362		AMD A6-5200 Quad-Core		2.00	AMD Radeon HD 8400						C55D-A5362
C55D-A5372		AMD A4-5000 Quad-Core		1.50	AMD Radeon HD 8330						C55D-A5372
C55D-A5380		AMD E1-1200 Dual-Core		1.40	AMD Radeon HD 7310						C55D-A5380
C55D-A5381		AMD E1-1200 Dual-Core		1.40	AMD Radeon HD 7310						C55D-A5381
C55D-A5382		AMD A4-5000 Quad-Core		1.50	AMD Radeon HD 8330						C55D-A5382
C55D-A5392		AMD A4-5000 Quad-Core		1.50	AMD Radeon HD 8330						C55D-A5392
C55D-B5102		AMD A8-6410 Quad-Core			AMD Radeon R5				Built-in stereo speakers		C55D-B5102
C55D-B5160		AMD E1-6010 Dual-Core		1.35	AMD Radeon R2				Built-in stereo speakers		C55D-B5160
C55D-B5203		AMD A8-6410 Quad-Core			AMD Radeon R5				Built-in stereo speakers		C55D-B5203
C55D-B5206		AMD A8-6410 Quad-Core			AMD Radeon R5						C55D-B5206
C55D-B5212		AMD A8-6410 Quad-Core			AMD Radeon R4						C55D-B5212
C55D-B5214		AMD A8-6410 Quad-Core			AMD Radeon R5						C55D-B5214
C55D-B5219		AMD A6-6310 Quad-Core		2.40	AMD Radeon R4						C55D-B5219
C55D-B5241		AMD A4-6210 Quad-Core		1.80	AMD Radeon R3						C55D-B5241
C55D-B5242		AMD A4-6210 Quad-Core		1.80	AMD Radeon R3						C55D-B5242
C55D-B5244		AMD A6-6310 Quad-Core		2.40	AMD Radeon R4						C55D-B5244
C55D-B5253		AMD A8-6410 Quad-Core		2.40	AMD Radeon R5						C55D-B5253
C55D-B5310		AMD A8-6410 Quad-Core			AMD Radeon R5						C55D-B5310
C55D-B5351		AMD A8-6410 Quad-Core			AMD Radeon R5						C55D-B5351
C55D-B5385		AMD A8-6410 Quad-Core			AMD Radeon R5						C55D-B5385
C55D-C5137		AMD A6-7310 Quad-Core			AMD Radeon R4						C55D-C5137
C55D-C5251		AMD A8-7410 Quad-Core			AMD Radeon R5						C55D-C5251
C55D-C5271		AMD A4-7210 Quad-Core			AMD Radeon R3						C55D-C5271
C55DT-A5106		AMD A6-5200 Quad-Core		2.00	AMD Radeon HD 8400						C55DT-A5106
C55DT-A5148		AMD A4-5000 Quad-Core		1.50	AMD Radeon HD 8330						C55DT-A5148
C55DT-A5231		AMD E1-1200 Dual-Core	AMD A68M	1.40	AMD Radeon HD 7310						C55DT-A5231
C55DT-A5233		AMD A4-5000 Quad-Core		1.50	AMD Radeon HD 8330						C55DT-A5233
C55DT-A5241		AMD E1-1200 Dual-Core		1.40	AMD Radeon HD 7310						C55DT-A5241
C55DT-A5244		AMD A4-5000 Quad-Core		1.50	AMD Radeon HD 8330						C55DT-A5244
C55DT-A5250		AMD E1-1200 Dual-Core	AMD A68M	1.40	AMD Radeon HD 7310						C55DT-A5250
C55DT-A5305		AMD A6-5200 Quad-Core		2.00	AMD Radeon HD 8400						C55DT-A5305
C55DT-A5306		AMD A6-5200 Quad-Core		2.00	AMD Radeon HD 8400						C55DT-A5306
C55DT-A5307		AMD A6-5200 Quad-Core		2.00	AMD Radeon HD 8400						C55DT-A5307
C55DT-B5128		AMD A6-6310 Quad-Core		2.40	AMD Radeon R4						C55DT-B5128
C55DT-B5153		AMD A8-6410 Quad-Core			AMD Radeon R5						C55DT-B5153
C55DT-B5205		AMD A8-6410 Quad-Core			AMD Radeon R5						C55DT-B5205
C55DT-B5208		AMD A8-6410 Quad-Core			AMD Radeon R5						C55DT-B5208
C55DT-B5245		AMD A4-6210 Quad-Core		1.80	AMD Radeon R3						C55DT-B5245
C55DT-B5386	15.6” TruBrite TFT @ 1366x768 native resolution (HD) with touchscreen	AMD A8-6410 Quad-Core			AMD Radeon R5	8 GB DDR3L @ 1600 MHz	1 TB (5400 RPM) Serial ATA HDD			Windows 10 Home	C55DT-B5386
C55DT-C5230		AMD A4-7210 Quad Core			AMD Radeon R3	4 GB DDR3L @ 1600 MHz					C55DT-C5230
C55DT-C5245		AMD A8-7410 Quad-Core			AMD Radeon R5	6 GB @ DDR3L 1600 MHz					C55DT-C5245
C55T-A5218		Intel Pentium 2020M	Mobile Intel HM70 Express	2.40	Mobile Intel HD Graphics	4 GB DDR3 @ 1600 MHz (max 16 GB)					C55T-A5218
C55T-A5222		Intel Celeron 1005M	Mobile Intel HM70 Express	1.90	Mobile Intel HD Graphics	4 GB DDR3 @ 1600 MHz (max 16 GB)					C55T-A5222
C55T-A5247		2nd Gen Intel Core i3-2348M	Mobile Intel HM76 Express	2.30	Mobile Intel HD Graphics	4 GB DDR3 @ 1333 MHz (max 16 GB)					C55T-A5247
C55T-A5287		2nd Gen Intel Core i3-2348M	Mobile Intel HM76 Express	2.30	Mobile Intel HD Graphics						C55T-A5287
C55T-A5350		3rd Gen Intel Core i3-3110M	Mobile Intel HM76 Express	2.40	Mobile Intel HD Graphics						C55T-A5350
C55T-A5370		3rd Gen Intel Core i3-3110M	Mobile Intel HM76 Express	2.40	Mobile Intel HD Graphics						C55T-A5370
C55T-A5378		3rd Gen Intel Core i3-3110M	Mobile Intel HM76 Express	2.40	Mobile Intel HD Graphics						C55T-A5378
C55T-A5394		3rd Gen Intel Core i3-3110M	Mobile Intel HM76 Express	2.40	Mobile Intel HD Graphics						C55T-A5394
C55T-C5383		5th Gen Intel Core i3-5005U		2.00	Mobile Intel HD Graphics						C55T-C5383
C605-SP4101L		Intel Pentium T4500	Mobile Intel GL40 Express	2.30	Intel Graphics Media Accelerator 4500M						C605-SP4101L
C605-SP4102L		Intel Pentium T4500	Mobile Intel GM45 Express	2.30	NVIDIA GeForce 315M with 512 MB GDDR3						C605-SP4102L
C605-SP4104L		Intel Pentium T4500	Mobile Intel GL40 Express	2.30	Intel Graphics Media Accelerator 4500M						C605-SP4104L
C605-SP4160M		Intel Celeron 925		2.30							C605-SP4160M
C605-SP4161M		Intel Pentium T4500		2.30							C605-SP4161M
C605-SP4162M		Intel Celeron 925		2.30							C605-SP4162M
C605-SP4163M		Intel Pentium T4500		2.30							C605-SP4163M
C605-SP4164M		Intel Pentium T4500		2.30							C605-SP4164M
C645D-S4024		AMD Athlon II P320 Dual-Core	AMD M880G	2.10	ATI Mobility Radeon HD 4250	3 GB DDR3 (max 8 GB)					C645D-S4024
C645D-SP4007		AMD Athlon II P320 Dual-Core	AMD M880G	2.10	ATI Mobility Radeon HD 4250	2 GB DDR3 (max 8 GB)					C645D-SP4007
C645D-SP4018		AMD Athlon II Dual-Core Mobile P340	AMD M880G	2.20	ATI Mobility Radeon HD 4250	2 GB DDR3 (max 8 GB)					C645D-SP4018
C645D-SP4130L		AMD Athlon II Dual-Core Mobile P360		2.30							C645D-SP4130L
C645D-SP4143L		AMD E-300 Dual-Core		1.30	AMD Radeon HD 6310						C645D-SP4143L
C645D-SP4144L		AMD E-450 Dual-Core		1.65	AMD Radeon HD 6320						C645D-SP4144L
C645D-SP4160M		AMD Athlon II Dual-Core Mobile P360		2.30	ATI Mobility Radeon HD 4250						C645D-SP4160M
C645D-SP4283M		AMD E-300 Dual-Core		1.30	AMD Radeon HD 6310						C645D-SP4283M
C645-SP4011		Intel Pentium P6100	Mobile Intel HM55 Express	2.00	Mobile Intel HD Graphics @ 64-763 MB						C645-SP4011
C645-SP4131		Intel Pentium P6200	Mobile Intel HM55 Express	2.13	Mobile Intel HD Graphics @ 64-763 MB						C645-SP4131
C645-SP4132L		Intel Pentium P6200	Mobile Intel HM55 Express	2.13	ATI Mobility Radeon HD 5470						C645-SP4132L
C645-SP4162M		Intel Pentium P6200	Mobile Intel HM55 Express	2.13	Mobile Intel HD Graphics @ 64-1275 MB						C645-SP4162M
C650-BT2N11		Intel Pentium T4500	Mobile Intel GL40 Express	2.30	Intel Graphics Media Accelerator 4500M						C650-BT2N11
C650-BT5N11		Intel Celeron B815	Mobile Intel HM65 Express	1.60	Mobile Intel HD Graphics						C650-BT5N11
C650D-BT2N13		AMD V140		2.30	ATI Mobility Radeon HD 4250						C650D-BT2N13
C650D-BT2N15		AMD E-240		1.50	AMD Radeon HD 6310						C650D-BT2N15
C650D-BT5N11		AMD E-300		1.30–1.65	AMD Radeon HD 6310						C650D-BT5N11
C650D-ST2N01		AMD Athlon Dual Core P320		2.10	ATI Mobility Radeon HD 4250						C650D-ST2N01
C650D-ST2N02		AMD Athlon II Dual-Core Mobile P340		2.20	ATI Mobility Radeon HD 4250						C650D-ST2N02
C650D-ST2N03		AMD Athlon II Dual-Core Mobile P360		2.30	ATI Mobility Radeon HD 4250						C650D-ST2N03
C650D-ST2NX1		AMD Athlon II Dual Core P320		2.10	ATI Mobility Radeon HD 4250						C650D-ST2NX1
C650D-ST2NX2		AMD Athlon II Dual-Core Mobile P340		2.20	ATI Mobility Radeon HD 4250						C650D-ST2NX2
C650D-ST3NX2		AMD E-240		1.50	AMD Radeon HD 6310						C650D-ST3NX2
C650D-ST4NX1		AMD C-50 Dual-Core		1.00	AMD Radeon HD 6250						C650D-ST4NX1
C650D-ST5N01		AMD E-450		1.65	AMD Radeon HD 6320						C650D-ST5N01
C650D-ST5NX1		AMD E-300 Dual-Core		1.30	AMD Radeon HD 6310						C650D-ST5NX1
C650D-ST6N02		AMD E-300 Dual-Core		1.30	AMD Radeon HD 6310						C650D-ST6N02
C650D-ST6NX2		AMD E-300 Dual-Core		1.30	AMD Radeon HD 6310						C650D-ST6NX2
C650-ST2NX1		Intel Pentium T4500	Mobile Intel GL40 Express	2.30	Intel Graphics Media Accelerator 4500M						C650-ST2NX1
C650-ST4N02		Intel Pentium B940	Mobile Intel HM65 Express	2.00	Mobile Intel HD Graphics @ 64-1696 MB						C650-ST4N02
C650-ST5N02		Intel Pentium B950	Mobile Intel HM65 Express	2.10	Mobile Intel HD Graphics @ 64-1696 MB						C650-ST5N02
C650-ST5N03		Intel Core i3-2310M	Mobile Intel HM65 Express	2.10	Mobile Intel HD Graphics @ 64-1696 MB						C650-ST5N03
C650-ST6N01		Intel Pentium B960	Mobile Intel HM65 Express	2.20	Mobile Intel HD Graphics @ 64-1696 MB						C650-ST6N01
C650-ST6N02		Intel Pentium B960	Mobile Intel HM65 Express	2.20	Mobile Intel HD Graphics						C650-ST6N02
C650-ST6N03		Intel Core i3-2350M	Mobile Intel HM65 Express	2.30	Mobile Intel HD Graphics						C650-ST6N03
C650-ST6NX3		Intel Pentium B960	Mobile Intel HM65 Express	2.20	Mobile Intel HD Graphics @ 64-1696 MB						C650-ST6NX3
C650-ST6NX4		Intel Pentium B960	Mobile Intel HM65 Express	2.20	Mobile Intel HD Graphics						C650-ST6NX4
C650-ST6NX5		Intel Core i3-2350M	Mobile Intel HM65 Express	2.30	Mobile Intel HD Graphics						C650-ST6NX5
C655D-S5048		AMD Athlon II Dual-Core P320	AMD M880G	2.10	ATI Mobility Radeon HD 4250						C655D-S5048
C655D-S5051		AMD Athlon II Dual-Core P320	AMD M880G	2.10	ATI Mobility Radeon HD 4250						C655D-S5051
C655D-S5057		AMD Athlon II Dual-Core P320	AMD M880G	2.10	ATI Mobility Radeon HD 4250						C655D-S5057
C655D-S5064		AMD Athlon II Dual-Core P320	AMD M880G	2.10	ATI Mobility Radeon HD 4250						C655D-S5064
C655D-S5084		AMD Athlon II Mobile Dual-Core P340	AMD M880G	2.20	ATI Mobility Radeon HD 4250						C655D-S5084
C655D-S50853		AMD Athlon II Mobile Dual-Core P340	AMD M880G	2.20	ATI Mobility Radeon HD 4250						C655D-S50853
C655D-S50854		AMD Athlon II Mobile Dual-Core P340	AMD M880G	2.20	ATI Mobility Radeon HD 4250						C655D-S50854
C655D-S5088		AMD Athlon II Mobile Dual-Core P340	AMD M880G	2.20	ATI Mobility Radeon HD 4250						C655D-S5088
C655D-S5120		AMD Athlon II Mobile Dual-Core P340	AMD M880G	2.20	ATI Mobility Radeon HD 4250						C655D-S5120
C655D-S5126		AMD E-240		1.50	AMD Radeon HD 6310						C655D-S5126
C655D-S5130		AMD E-240		1.50	AMD Radeon HD 6310						C655D-S5130
C655D-S5133		AMD E-240		1.50	AMD Radeon HD 6310						C655D-S5133
C655D-S5135		AMD E-240		1.50	AMD Radeon HD 6310						C655D-S5135
C655D-S5136		AMD Athlon II Dual-Core Mobile P340		2.20	ATI Mobility Radeon HD 4250						C655D-S5136
C655D-S5138		AMD E-240		1.50	AMD Radeon HD 6310						C655D-S5138
C655D-S5139		AMD E-240		1.60	AMD Radeon HD 6310						C655D-S5139
C655D-S5192		AMD E-240		1.50	AMD Radeon HD 6310						C655D-S5192
C655D-S5200		AMD C-50 Dual-Core		1.00	AMD Radeon HD 6250						C655D-S5200
C655D-S5202		AMD C-50 Dual-Core		1.00	AMD Radeon HD 6250						C655D-S5202
C655D-S5209		AMD E-350		1.60	AMD Radeon HD 6310						C655D-S5209
C655D-S5210		AMD E-350		1.00	AMD Radeon HD 6310						C655D-S5210
C655D-S5228		AMD C-50 Dual-Core		1.00	AMD Radeon HD 6250						C655D-S5228
C655D-S5230		AMD C-50 Dual-Core		1.00	AMD Radeon HD 6250						C655D-S5230
C655D-S5232		AMD C-50 Dual-Core		1.00	AMD Radeon HD 6250						C655D-S5232
C655D-S5233		AMD C-50 Dual-Core		1.00	AMD Radeon HD 6250						C655D-S5233
C655D-S5234		AMD C-50 Dual-Core		1.00	AMD Radeon HD 6250						C655D-S5234
C655D-S5236		AMD C-50 Dual-Core		1.00	AMD Radeon HD 6250						C655D-S5236
C655D-S5300		AMD E-300		1.30	AMD Radeon HD 6310						C655D-S5300
C655D-S5302		AMD E-300		1.30	AMD Radeon HD 6310						C655D-S5302
C655D-S5303		AMD E-350		1.60	AMD Radeon HD 6310						C655D-S5303
C655D-S5304		AMD E-450 Dual-Core		1.65	AMD Radeon HD 6320						C655D-S5304
C655D-S5330		AMD E-300		1.30	AMD Radeon HD 6310						C655D-S5330
C655D-S5331		AMD E-300		1.30	AMD Radeon HD 6310						C655D-S5331
C655D-S5332		AMD E-300		1.30	AMD Radeon HD 6310						C655D-S5332
C655D-S5334		AMD E-450 Dual-Core		1.65	AMD Radeon HD 6320						C655D-S5334
C655D-S5336		AMD E-450 Dual-Core		1.65	AMD Radeon HD 6320						C655D-S5336
C655D-S5338		AMD E-300		1.30							C655D-S5338
C655D-S5508		AMD E-300		1.30							C655D-S5508
C655D-S5509		AMD E-300		1.30							C655D-S5509
C655D-S5511		AMD E-300		1.30							C655D-S5511
C655D-S5515		AMD E-300		1.30							C655D-S5515
C655D-S5518		AMD E-300		1.30							C655D-S5518
C655D-S5531		AMD E-300		1.30							C655D-S5531
C655D-S5533		AMD E-300		1.30							C655D-S5533
C655D-S5535		AMD E-300		1.30							C655D-S5535
C655D-S5536		AMD E-300		1.30							C655D-S5536
C655D-S5540		AMD E-450		1.65							C655D-S5540
C655D-S9511D		AMD E-240		1.50							C655D-S9511D
C655D-SP4131L		AMD E-240		1.50							C655D-SP4131L
C655D-SP4151M		AMD E-240		1.50							C655D-SP4151M
C655-S5047		Intel Celeron 900	Mobile Intel GL40 Express	2.20	Intel Graphics Media Accelerator 4500M						C655-S5047
C655-S5049		Intel Celeron 900	Mobile Intel GL40 Express	2.20							C655-S5049
C655-S5052		Intel Pentium T4500	Mobile Intel GL40 Express	2.30							C655-S5052
C655-S5053		Intel Celeron 900	Mobile Intel GL40 Express	2.20							C655-S5053
C655-S5054		Intel Celeron 900	Mobile Intel GL40 Express	2.20							C655-S5054
C655-S5056		Intel Pentium T4500	Mobile Intel GL40 Express	2.30							C655-S5056
C655-S5060		Intel Pentium	Mobile Intel GL40 Express	2.30							C655-S5060
C655-S5068		Intel Pentium		2.30							C655-S5068
C655-S5082		Intel Celeron		2.20							C655-S5082
C655-S5118		Intel Core i3-370M		2.40							C655-S5118
C655-S5119		Intel Pentium P6100		2.00							C655-S5119
C655-S5122		Intel Core i3-380M		2.53							C655-S5122
C655-S5125		Intel Celeron		2.30							C655-S5125
C655-S5127		Intel Core i3-380M		2.53							C655-S5127
C655-S5128		Intel Core i3-380M		2.53							C655-S5128
C655-S5129		Intel Pentium P6200		2.13							C655-S5129
C655-S5132		Intel Celeron		2.30							C655-S5132
C655-S5137		Intel Core i3-380M		2.53							C655-S5137
C655-S5140		Intel Core i3-380M		2.53							C655-S5140
C655-S5141		Intel Core i3-380M		2.53							C655-S5141
C655-S5142		Intel Celeron		2.30							C655-S5142
C655-S5193		Intel Pentium P6200		2.13							C655-S5193
C655-S5195		Intel Core i3-380M		2.53							C655-S5195
C655-S5206		Intel Core i3-2310M		2.10							C655-S5206
C655-S5208		Intel Core i3-2310M		2.10							C655-S5208
C655-S5211		Intel Pentium B940		2.00							C655-S5211
C655-S5212		Intel Core i3-2310M		2.10							C655-S5212
C655-S5221		Intel Pentium B940		2.00							C655-S5221
C655-S5225		Intel Pentium		2.30							C655-S5225
C655-S5229		Intel Core i3-2310M		2.10							C655-S5229
C655-S5231		Intel Core i3-2310M		2.10							C655-S5231
C655-S5235		Intel Pentium B940		2.00							C655-S5235
C655-S5240		Intel Celeron		2.30							C655-S5240
C655-S5301		Intel Core i3-2330M		2.20							C655-S5301
C655-S5305		Intel Core i3-2330M		2.20							C655-S5305
C655-S5307		Intel Core i3-2330M		2.20							C655-S5307
C655-S5310		Intel Pentium B950		2.10							C655-S5310
C655-S5312		Intel Pentium B950		2.10							C655-S5312
C655-S5314		Intel Pentium B950		2.10							C655-S5314
C655-S5333		Intel Core i3-2330M		2.20							C655-S5333
C655-S5335		Intel Celeron		1.50							C655-S5335
C655-S5339		Intel Pentium B950		2.10							C655-S5339
C655-S5340		Intel Core i3-2330M		2.20							C655-S5340
C655-S5341		Intel Core i3-2330M		2.20							C655-S5341
C655-S5342		Intel Core i3-2330M		2.20							C655-S5342
C655-S5503		Intel Core i3-2350M		2.30							C655-S5503
C655-S5505		Intel Pentium B960		2.20							C655-S5505
C655-S5507		Intel Pentium B960		2.20							C655-S5507
C655-S9510D		Intel Celeron		2.30							C655-S9510D
C655-S9520D		Intel Pentium P6100		2.00							C655-S9520D
C655-S9532D		Intel Core i3-380M		2.53							C655-S9532D
C655-S9533D		Intel Core i3-380M		2.53							C655-S9533D
C655-SP4132L		Intel Pentium P6200		2.13							C655-SP4132L
C655-SP4163M		Intel Celeron 900		2.20							C655-SP4163M
C655-SP4164M		Intel Celeron 925		2.30							C655-SP4164M
C655-SP4168M		Intel Core i3-380M		2.53							C655-SP4168M
C655-SP4169M		Intel Celeron		2.20							C655-SP4169M
C655-SP5018		Intel Celeron		2.20							C655-SP5018
C655-SP5019		Intel Pentium P6100		2.00							C655-SP5019
C655-SP5030		Intel Pentium		2.30							C655-SP5030
C655-SP5133L		Intel Pentium B940		2.00							C655-SP5133L
C655-SP5135L		Intel Pentium B940		2.00							C655-SP5135L
C655-SP5183M		Intel Core i3-2310M		2.10							C655-SP5183M
C655-SP6001		Intel Celeron		2.20							C655-SP6001
C655-SP6007		Intel Celeron		2.20							C655-SP6007
C655-SP6008		Intel Pentium		2.30							C655-SP6008
C655-SP6009		Intel Pentium		2.30							C655-SP6009
C655-SP6010		Intel Pentium		2.30							C655-SP6010
C655-SP6011		Intel Pentium		2.30							C655-SP6011
C675D-S7101		AMD E-series		1.30							C675D-S7101
C675D-S7109		AMD E-series		1.30							C675D-S7109
C675D-S7212		AMD C-50		1.00							C675D-S7212
C675D-S7325		AMD E-series		1.30							C675D-S7325
C675D-S7328		AMD E-450									C675D-S7328
C675-S7104		Intel Pentium B960	Mobile Intel HM65 Express	2.20							C675-S7104
C675-S7106		Intel Core i3-2350M	Mobile Intel HM65 Express	2.30							C675-S7106
C675-S7200		Intel Pentium B940	Mobile Intel HM65 Express	2.00							C675-S7200
C675-S7308		Intel Core i3-2330M	Mobile Intel HM65 Express	2.20							C675-S7308
C675-S7318		Intel Pentium B950	Mobile Intel HM65 Express	2.10							C675-S7318
C675-S7322		Intel Core i3-2330M	Mobile Intel HM65 Express	2.20							C675-S7322
C70-ABT2N12		Intel Celeron 1005M	Mobile Intel Series 7 Express	1.90							C70-ABT2N12
C70-ABT3N11		Intel Celeron 1005M	Mobile Intel Series 7 Express	1.80							C70-ABT3N11
C70-ASMBNX2		Intel Core i3-3120		2.50							C70-ASMBNX2
C70-AST3NX1		Intel Celeron 1005M		1.80							C70-AST3NX1
C70-AST3NX2		Intel Core i3-3120		2.50							C70-AST3NX2
C70-BBTN11		Intel Core i3-4025U		1.90							C70-BBTN11
C70-CBT2N11		5th Gen Intel Core: i3-5005U; i5-5200U		2.00–2.70							C70-CBT2N11
C70D-BBT2N11		AMD E1-6010		1.30	AMD Radeon R2						C70D-BBT2N11
C70D-BST2NX1		AMD A4-6210 Quad-Core		1.80	AMD Radeon R3						C70D-BST2NX1
C70D-CBT2N11		AMD E1-7010		1.50	AMD Radeon R2						C70D-CBT2N11
C70D-CST2NX1		AMD A4-7210 Quad-Core									C70D-CST2NX1
C75-A7390		Intel Core i3-3120M	Mobile Intel HM76 Express	2.50	Mobile Intel HD Graphics						C75-A7390
C75D-A7102		AMD A6-5200M Quad-Core		2.00	AMD Radeon HD 8400						C75D-A7102
C75D-A7213		AMD A4-5000M Quad-Core		1.50	AMD Radeon HD 8330						C75D-A7213
C75D-A7223		AMD A4-5000M Quad-Core		1.50	AMD Radeon HD 8330						C75D-A7223
C75D-A7226		AMD A4-5000M Quad-Core		1.50	AMD Radeon HD 8330						C75D-A7226
C75D-A7265NR		AMD A6-5200M Quad-Core		2.00	AMD Radeon HD 8400						C75D-A7265NR
C75D-A7286		AMD A4-5000M Quad-Core		1.50	AMD Radeon HD 8330						C75D-A7286
C75D-A7340		AMD A6-5200M Quad-Core		2.00	AMD Radeon HD 8400						C75D-A7340
C75D-A7370		AMD A6-5200M Quad-Core		2.00	AMD Radeon HD 8400						C75D-A7370
C75D-B7100		AMD A8-6410 Quad-Core		2.00	AMD Radeon R5						C75D-B7100
C75D-B7202		AMD A8-6410 Quad-Core		2.00	AMD Radeon R5						C75D-B7202
C75D-B7215		AMD A8-6410 Quad-Core			AMD Radeon R4						C75D-B7215
C75D-B7220		AMD A4-6210		1.80							C75D-B7220
C75D-B7230		AMD A6-6310		2.40							C75D-B7230
C75D-B7260		AMD A6-6310		2.40							C75D-B7260
C75D-B7280		AMD A8									C75D-B7280
C75D-B7300		AMD A8-6410									C75D-B7300
C75D-B7304		AMD A6-6310		2.40							C75D-B7304
C75D-B7320		AMD A8									C75D-B7320
C75D-B7350		AMD A4-6210		1.80							C75D-B7350
C75D-B7360		AMD A8-6410									C75D-B7360
C75D-C7220		AMD A6									C75D-C7220
C75D-C7220X		AMD A6									C75D-C7220X
C75D-C7224		AMD A8									C75D-C7224
C75D-C7232		AMD A6									C75D-C7232
C845D-SP4216SL		AMD E-300		1.30							C845D-SP4216SL
C845D-SP4275FM		AMD E1-1200									C845D-SP4275FM
C845D-SP4277FM		AMD E2-1800		1.70							C845D-SP4277FM
C845D-SP4278 km		AMD E-300		1.30							C845D-SP4278KM
C845-S4230		Intel Pentium B970	Mobile Intel 7 Series Express	2.30	Mobile Intel HD Graphics						C845-S4230
C845-SP4201SL		Intel Pentium B960	Mobile Intel 7 Series Express	2.20	Mobile Intel HD Graphics						C845-SP4201SL
C845-SP4214SL		Intel Celeron B815	Mobile Intel 7 Series Express	1.60	Mobile Intel HD Graphics						C845-SP4214SL
C850-BT2N12		Intel Celeron 1000M	Mobile Intel 7 Series Express	1.80	Mobile Intel HD Graphics						C850-BT2N12
C850D-00G00F		AMD E1-1200	AMD A68M	1.40	AMD Radeon HD 7310						C850D-00G00F
C850D-BT2N11		AMD E1-1200 Dual-Core	AMD A68M	1.40–1.70							C850D-BT2N11
C850D-BT3N11		AMD E1-1200	AMD A68M	1.40–1.70							C850D-BT3N11
C850D-ST2N02		AMD E1-1200	AMD A68M	1.40							C850D-ST2N02
C850D-ST3N01		AMD E1-1200	AMD A68M	1.40							C850D-ST3N01
C850D-ST3NX1		AMD E1-1200	AMD A68M	1.40							C850D-ST3NX1
C850-ST4NX4		Intel Core i3-2348M	Mobile Intel 7 Series Express	2.30	Mobile Intel HD Graphics						C850-ST4NX4
C850-ST4NX5		Intel Core i5-3230M	Mobile Intel HM76 Express	3.20	Mobile Intel HD Graphics						C850-ST4NX5
C850-ST4NX8		Intel Celeron 1000M	Mobile Intel 7 Series Express	1.80	Mobile Intel HD Graphics						C850-ST4NX8
C855D-S5100		AMD E-300 Dual-Core	AMD A68M	1.30	AMD Radeon HD 6310	4 GB DDR3 @ 1066 MHz (max 16 GB)	320 GB (5400 RPM) Serial ATA HDD				C855D-S5100
C855D-S5103		AMD E-300 Dual-Core	AMD A68M	1.30	AMD Radeon HD 6310	4 GB DDR3 @ 1066 MHz (max 16 GB)	320 GB (5400 RPM) Serial ATA HDD				C855D-S5103
C855D-S5104		AMD E-300 Dual-Core	AMD A68M	1.30	AMD Radeon HD 6310	4 GB DDR3 @ 1066 MHz (max 16 GB)	500 GB (5400 RPM) Serial ATA HDD				C855D-S5104
C855D-S5105		AMD E-300 Dual-Core	AMD A68M	1.30	AMD Radeon HD 6310	4 GB DDR3 @ 1066 MHz (max 16 GB)	320 GB (5400 RPM) Serial ATA HDD				C855D-S5105
C855D-S5106		AMD E-300 Dual-Core	AMD A68M	1.30	AMD Radeon HD 6310	4 GB DDR3 @ 1066 MHz (max 16 GB)	320 GB (5400 RPM) Serial ATA HDD				C855D-S5106
C855D-S5109		AMD A6-4400M	AMD A70M	2.70 (	AMD Radeon HD 7520G	4 GB DDR3 @ 1600 MHz (max 16 GB)	500 GB (5400 RPM) Serial ATA HDD				C855D-S5109
C855D-S5110		AMD A6-4400M	AMD A70M	2.70 (	AMD Radeon HD 7520G	4 GB DDR3 @ 1600 MHz (max 16 GB)	500 GB (5400 RPM) Serial ATA HDD				C855D-S5110
C855D-S5116		AMD A6-4400M	AMD A70M	2.70 (	AMD Radeon HD 7520G	4 GB DDR3 @ 1600 MHz (max 16 GB)	500 GB (5400 RPM) Serial ATA HDD				C855D-S5116
C855D-S5135NR		AMD A6-4400M	AMD A70M	2.70 (	AMD Radeon HD 7520G	6 GB DDR3 @ 1600 MHz (max 16 GB)	640 GB (5400 RPM) Serial ATA HDD				C855D-S5135NR
C855D-S5196		AMD E1-1200		1.40							C855D-S5196
C855D-S5201		AMD E1-1200		1.40							C855D-S5201
C855D-S5202		AMD E-300		1.30							C855D-S5202
C855D-S5205		AMD E-450		1.65							C855D-S5205
C855D-S5209		AMD A6-4400M		2.70							C855D-S5209
C855D-S5228		AMD E1-1200		1.40							C855D-S5228
C855D-S5229		AMD E1-1200		1.40							C855D-S5229
C855D-S5230		AMD E1-1200		1.40							C855D-S5230
C855D-S5232		AMD E1-1200		1.40							C855D-S5232
C855D-S5235		AMD E1-1200		1.40							C855D-S5235
C855D-S5237		AMD A6-4400M		2.70							C855D-S5237
C855D-S5238		AMD A6-4400M		2.70							C855D-S5238
C855D-S5302		AMD E-300		1.30							C855D-S5302
C855D-S5303		AMD E-300		1.30							C855D-S5303
C855D-S5305		AMD E-450		1.70							C855D-S5305
C855D-S5307		AMD A6-4400M		2.70							C855D-S5307
C855D-S5315		AMD E-300		1.30							C855D-S5315
C855D-S5320		AMD E2-1800		1.70							C855D-S5320
C855D-S5339		AMD E-300		1.30							C855D-S5339
C855D-S5340		AMD E1-1200		1.40	AMD Radeon HD 7310		320 GB (5400 RPM) Serial ATA HDD				C855D-S5340
C855D-S5344		AMD E1-1200		1.40							C855D-S5344
C855D-S5351		AMD A6-4400M		2.70							C855D-S5351
C855D-S5353		AMD A6-4400M		2.70							C855D-S5353
C855D-S5354		AMD E-300		1.30							C855D-S5354
C855D-S5357		AMD E-300		1.30							C855D-S5357
C855D-S5359		AMD E1-1200		1.40							C855D-S5359
C855D-S5900		AMD E-300		1.30							C855D-S5900
C855D-S5950		AMD E-300		1.30							C855D-S5950
C855D-SP5265FM		AMD E1-1200									C855D-SP5265FM
C855-S5107		Intel Pentium 2020M	Mobile Intel HM70 Express	2.40	Mobile Intel HD Graphics						C855-S5107
C855-S5108		Intel Core i3-3120M	Mobile Intel HM76 Express	2.50	Mobile Intel HD Graphics						C855-S5108
C855-S5111		Intel Core i3-3120M	Mobile Intel HM76 Express	2.50	Mobile Intel HD Graphics						C855-S5111
C855-S5115		Intel Core i3-3120M	Mobile Intel HM76 Express	2.50	Mobile Intel HD Graphics						C855-S5115
C855-S5118		Intel Celeron 847	Mobile Intel NM70 Express	1.10	Mobile Intel HD Graphics						C855-S5118
C855-S5122		Intel Core i3-3120M	Mobile Intel HM76 Express	2.50	Mobile Intel HD Graphics						C855-S5122
C855-S5123		Intel Core i3-3120M	Mobile Intel HM76 Express	2.50	Mobile Intel HD Graphics						C855-S5123
C855-S5132NR		Intel Pentium 2020M		2.40							C855-S5132NR
C855-S5133		Intel Core i3-2348M		2.30							C855-S5133
C855-S5134		Intel Pentium 2020M		2.40							C855-S5134
C855-S5137		Intel Core i3-3120M		2.50							C855-S5137
C855-S5153		Intel Core i3-3120M		2.50							C855-S5153
C855-S5158		Intel Core i3-2348M		2.30							C855-S5158
C855-S5190		Intel Pentium 2020M		2.40							C855-S5190
C855-S5192		Intel Core i3-3120M		2.50							C855-S5192
C855-S5194		Intel Core i3-3120M		2.50							C855-S5194
C855-S5206		Intel Core i3-2370M		2.40							C855-S5206
C855-S5231		Intel Pentium B970		2.30							C855-S5231
C855-S5233		Intel Celeron B820		1.70							C855-S5233
C855-S5234		Intel Pentium B970		2.30							C855-S5234
C855-S5236		Intel Pentium B970		2.30							C855-S5236
C855-S5239		Intel Core i3-2370M		2.40							C855-S5239
C855-S5239P		Intel Core i3-2370M		2.40							C855-S5239P
C855-S5241		Intel Pentium B970		2.30							C855-S5241
C855-S5245		Intel Core i3-2370M		2.40							C855-S5245
C855-S5247		Intel Core i3-2370M		2.40							C855-S5247
C855-S5306		Intel Core i3-3110M		2.40							C855-S5306
C855-S5308		Intel Core i3-3110M		2.40							C855-S5308
C855-S5346		Intel Celeron 847		1.10	Mobile Intel HD Graphics				Built-in stereo speakers with Toshiba Audio Enhancments		C855-S5346
C855-S5347		Intel Celeron B830		1.80	Mobile Intel HD Graphics				Built-in stereo speakers with Toshiba Audio Enhancments		C855-S5347
C855-S5348		Intel Pentium B980		2.40							C855-S5348
C855-S5349N		Intel Pentium B980		2.40							C855-S5349N
C855-S5350N		Intel Pentium B980		2.40							C855-S5350N
C855-S5350		Intel Pentium B980		2.40							C855-S5350
C855-S5352		Intel Core i3-3110M		2.40							C855-S5352
C855-S5356		Intel Core i3-2328M		2.20							C855-S5356
C855-S5358		Intel Core i3-2328M		2.20							C855-S5358
C855-S5630		Intel Core i3-2348M		2.30							C855-S5630
C870-BT2N11		Intel Pentium B970 or Core i3-2370M		2.30–2.40							C870-BT2N11
C875D-S7105		AMD A6-4400M	AMD A70M	2.70	AMD Radeon HD 7520G						C875D-S7105
C875D-S7120		AMD E2-1800 Dual-Core	AMD A68M	1.70	AMD Radeon HD 7340						C875D-S7120
C875D-S7220		AMD E1-1200 Dual-Core	AMD A68M	1.40	AMD Radeon HD 7310						C875D-S7220
C875D-S7222		AMD E1-1200	AMD A68M	1.40	AMD Radeon HD 7310						C875D-S7222
C875D-S7223		AMD E1-1200		1.40							C875D-S7223
C875D-S7225		AMD A6-4400M		2.70							C875D-S7225
C875D-S7226		AMD E2-1800		1.70							C875D-S7226
C875D-S7330		AMD A4-4300M		2.50							C875D-S7330
C875D-S7331		AMD A4-4300M		2.50							C875D-S7331
C875D-S7345		AMD E1-1200		1.40							C875D-S7345
C875-S7103		Intel Core i3-3120M	Mobile Intel HM76 Express	2.50	Mobile Intel HD Graphics						C875-S7103
C875-S7132NR		Intel Core i3-3120M	Mobile Intel HM76 Express	2.50	Mobile Intel HD Graphics						C875-S7132NR
C875-S7132		Intel Core i3-3120M	Mobile Intel HM76 Express	2.50	Mobile Intel HD Graphics						C875-S7132
C875-S7228		Intel Core i3-2370M	Mobile Intel HM76 Express	2.40	Mobile Intel HD Graphics						C875-S7228
C875-S7303		Intel Core i3-3110M	Mobile Intel HM76 Express	2.40	Mobile Intel HD Graphics						C875-S7303
C875-S7304		Intel Core i3-3110M	Mobile Intel HM76 Express	2.40	Mobile Intel HD Graphics						C875-S7304
C875-S7340		Intel Core i3-3110M	Mobile Intel HM76 Express	2.40	Mobile Intel HD Graphics						C875-S7340
C875-S7341		Intel Core i3-2328M	Mobile Intel HM76 Express	2.40	Mobile Intel HD Graphics						C875-S7341
C875-S7344		Intel Core i3-2328M	Mobile Intel HM76 Express	2.40	Mobile Intel HD Graphics						C875-S7344
