= Ha-1-class submarine =

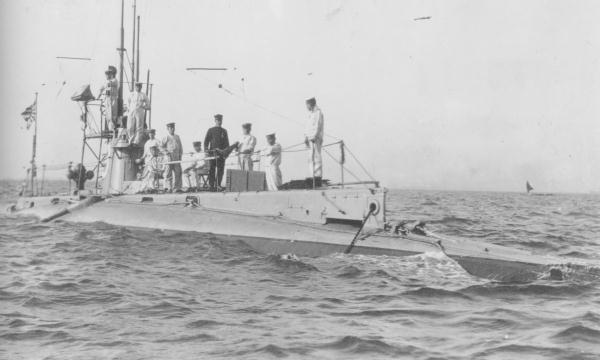
- Japanese submarine Ha-2, in 1921

Class overview
- Builders: Vickers, Barrow-in-Furness, UK
- Operators: Imperial Japanese Navy
- Succeeded by: Ha-3 class
- In commission: 1909–1924
- Completed: 2
- Retired: 2

General characteristics
- Type: Submarine
- Displacement: 286 long tons (291 t) surfaced; 321 long tons (326 t) submerged
- Length: 43.3 m (142 ft 1 in)
- Beam: 4.14 m (13 ft 7 in)
- Draft: 3.43 m (11 ft 3 in)
- Installed power: 600 hp (450 kW) (gasoline engines); 300 hp (220 kW) (electric motors)
- Propulsion: Gasoline engines; Electric motors; 1 shaft
- Speed: 12 knots (22 km/h; 14 mph) surfaced; 7 knots (13 km/h; 8.1 mph) submerged
- Range: 660 nmi (1,220 km; 760 mi) at 12 knots (surfaced); 60 nmi (110 km; 69 mi) at 4 knots (submerged)
- Test depth: 30.5 metres (100 ft)
- Complement: 26 officers and enlisted
- Armament: 2 × 18 in (460 mm) bow torpedo tubes (4 × torpedoes); 1 × machine gun

The Ha-1-class submarine (波一型潜水艦, Ha-ichi-gata sensuikan) was an early class of submarines of the Imperial Japanese Navy, and were essentially British C-class submarines, which had been imported for evaluation and reverse engineering.

== Background ==
Following its experiment during and after the Russo-Japanese War with modified versions of the Holland-class vessels designed in the United States, the Imperial Japanese Navy turned to the United Kingdom, which had continued development of the Holland design with 13 vessels in its A class, 11 vessels in its B class and 38 vessels in its C class. The Japanese government contracted Vickers at Barrow-in-Furness for two vessels, which were laid down just after HMS C32 towards the end of the C-class production run for the Royal Navy. The completed vessels were shipped to Japan on a specially modified cargo vessel.

With limited endurance and only a ten percent reserve of buoyancy over their surface displacement, The Ha-1 class were poor surface vessels, but their spindle shaped hull made for good underwater performance compared to their contemporaries. They also had three times the displacement of their predecessors in the Imperial Japanese Navy, and were the first submarines considered usable as combat vessels by the Japanese.

== Design and description ==
The British C-class submarines were similar in design to the preceding B class and were intended for coastal patrol work and harbor defense. They had a petrol engine for surface propulsion and batteries for underwater propulsion. The design was intended to overcome the limitations of speed, endurance and seakeeping that had affected earlier Holland-type submarines, such as the Type 1 and Type 6 submarines in Japanese service, and were substantially larger. Their additional size increased their buoyancy and made them far less liable to unexpectedly plunge beneath the surface in bad weather. The addition of a deck casing above the hull also improved their seakeeping abilities. The design lacked any internal bulkheads which exposed the crew to the petrol engine's exhaust fumes. Mice were used to detect any concentrations of carbon monoxide inside the hull. Ventilation was provided for the batteries, but none for the crew's living area. No accommodations were provided for the crew and they were forced to improvise while at sea. In recognition of this issue, the crew's endurance was only expected to be four days during the summer and three days during the winter.

=== Propulsion ===
The C-class submarines had a single 16-cylinder petrol engine that had a designed output of 600 horsepower (450 kW) and drove a single propeller. This engine was developed by Vickers from the 450-horsepower (340 kW) Wolseley engine used in the A-class.

=== Armament ===
The Ha-1-class boats were armed with a pair of 18-inch (457 mm) torpedo tubes side-by-side in the bow and angled slightly downwards. Space was provided for a pair of reloads.

== Ships in class ==
- Japanese submarine Ha-1 (波号第一潜水艦, Ha-go Dai-ichi sensuikan), laid down 3 August 1907; launched 19 May 1908; commissioned 26 February 1909 as Submersible No.8; reclassified as 2nd class submersible on 4 August 1916, reclassified as 3rd class submarine on 1 April 1919; renamed Ha-1 on 15 June 1923, decommissioned on 1 April 1924.
- Japanese submarine Ha-2 (波号第二潜水艦, Ha-go Dai-ni sensuikan), laid down 3 August 1907; launched 19 May 1908; commissioned 9 March 1909 as Submersible No.9; reclassified as 2nd class submersible on 4 August 1916, reclassified as 3rd class submarine on 1 April 1919; renamed Ha-2 on 15 June 1923; decommissioned on 1 April 1924.
