= Japanese Type 1 submarine =

Imperial Japanese Navy Submarine type

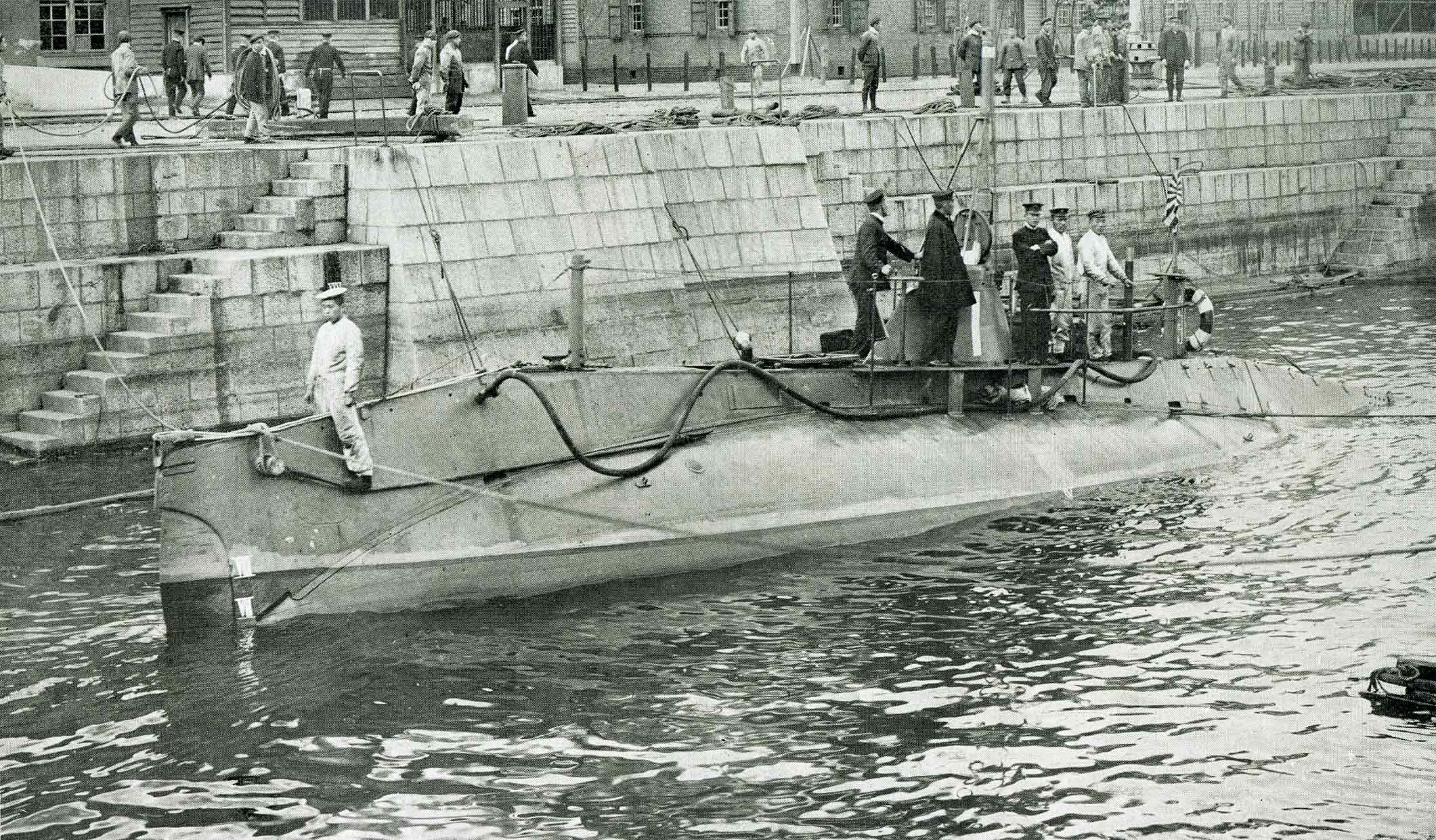
- Holland 1-class submarine purchased during the Russo-Japanese War

Class overview
- Builders: Fore River Shipbuilding, Quincy, Massachusetts, USA
- Operators: Imperial Japanese Navy
- Preceded by: none
- Succeeded by: Kaigun Type 6
- In commission: 1905–1921
- Completed: 5
- Retired: 5

General characteristics
- Type: Submarine
- Displacement: 103.25 long tons (104.91 t) surfaced; 124 long tons (126 t) submerged
- Length: 20.42 m (67.0 ft)
- Beam: 3.63 m (11.9 ft)
- Draft: 3.12 m (10.2 ft)
- Installed power: 180 hp (130 kW) (gasoline engines); 70 hp (52 kW) (electric motors)
- Propulsion: Gasoline engines; Electric motors; 1 shaft
- Speed: 8.868 knots (16.424 km/h; 10.205 mph) surfaced; 6.871 knots (12.725 km/h; 7.907 mph) submerged
- Range: 264 nm @ 8 knots (surfaced); 20.25 nm @ 6.75 knots (submerged)
- Test depth: 45.7 metres (150 ft)
- Complement: 16 officers and enlisted
- Armament: 2 × 18 in (460 mm) bow torpedo tubes (2 × torpedoes)

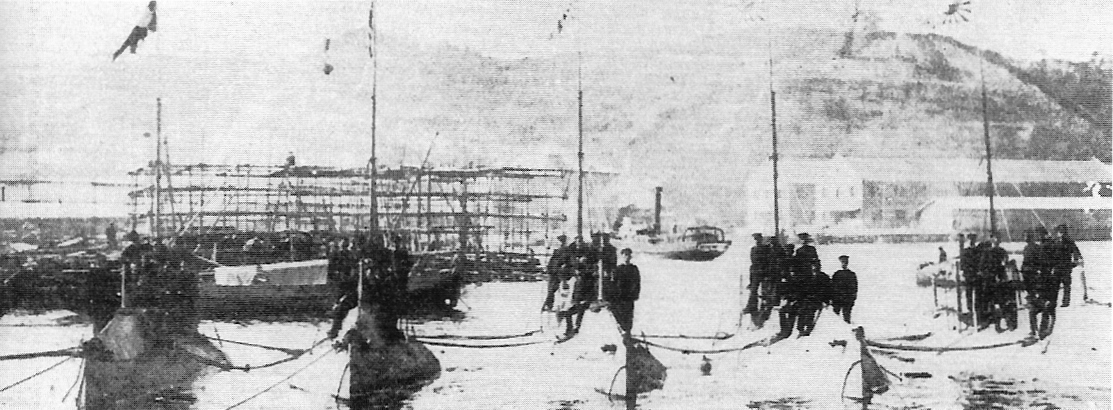
Japan's first fleet of submarines (Nos. 1 to 5, all Holland designs), assembled by Arthur Leopold Busch in the Naval Review of October 1905.

The No.1-class submarine (第一型潜水艦, Daiichi-gata sensuikan) was the first class submarine of the Imperial Japanese Navy. Consisting of five vessels, they were modified Holland-class vessels built in the United States.

== Background ==
The Japanese government was aware that the Imperial Russian Navy had obtained Fulton, a prototype of the United States A class or Plunger class in 1904 and had ordered an additional six vessels, designed by the Electric Boat Company and built in Russia under a 1904 emergency budget for use in the Russo-Japanese War. These vessels, known as the Som class, were assembled in St. Petersburg and were designed to be transportable by train.

In order to counter this threat to naval operations against the Russian Pacific Fleet, the Imperial Japanese Navy also made a contract with the Electric Boat Company and its Fore River Shipyard subcontractor for the construction of five Type VII submarines, a more advanced design than the Russian version, which had been developed in Lewis Nixon's Crescent Shipyard in an unsuccessful bid for the US Navy's United States B-class submarine contract.

== Construction and operational history ==
These vessels were built at the Fore River Shipyard in Quincy, Massachusetts, from August–October 1904. Arthur Leopold Busch oversaw construction of the vessels, their dismantling, transport to Seattle by rail, shipment to Yokohama and reassembly at the Yokosuka Naval Arsenal in Yokosuka, Japan. The project was done in complete secrecy, as the United States was officially neutral in the Russo-Japanese War.

The vessels arrived on 12 December 1904 in sections at the Yokohama dockyards. The entire project was completed in twelve months and were fully assembled and ready for combat operations by August 1905.Frank Taylor Cable, an electrician who was working for Isaac Rice's Electro-Dynamic and Electric Storage Battery Companies along with Rice's Electric Boat, arrived some six months after Busch, training the Imperial Japanese Navy in the operation of the newly introduced submarines. However, hostilities with Russia were nearing its end by that date, and no submarines saw action during the war. Busch was honored with the Order of the Rising Sun, 4th class by Emperor Meiji for his efforts. These submarines were used primarily for training duties. Submarine No-4 sank at Kure in a gasoline explosion on 14 November 1916, but was raised, repaired and placed back into service.

== Ships in class ==
- Japanese submarine No-1 (第一潜水艇, Dai-ichi sensuikan), laid down 30 November 1904; launched 20 March 1905; commissioned 31 July 1905; reclassified as 2nd class submersible on 4 August 1916, reclassified as 3rd class submarine on 1 April 1919; decommissioned on 30 April 1921.
- Japanese submarine No-2 (第二潜水艇, Dai-ni sensuikan), laid down 1 December 1904; launched 2 May 1905; commissioned 5 September 1905; reclassified as 2nd class submersible on 4 August 1916, reclassified as 3rd class submarine on 1 April 1919; decommissioned on 30 April 1921.
- Japanese submarine No-3 (第三潜水艇, Dai-san sensuikan), laid down 30 November 1904; launched 16 May 1905; commissioned 5 September 1905; reclassified as 2nd class submersible on 4 August 1916, reclassified as 3rd class submarine on 1 April 1919; decommissioned on 1 April 1921.
- Japanese submarine No-4 (第四潜水艇, Dai-yon sensuikan), laid down 4 December 1904; launched 27 May 1905; commissioned 1 October 1905; reclassified as 2nd class submersible on 4 August 1916, reclassified as 3rd class submarine on 1 April 1919; decommissioned on 1 April 1921.
- Japanese submarine No-5 (第五潜水艇, Dai-go sensuikan), laid down 30 November 1904; launched 13 May 1905; commissioned 1 October 1905; reclassified as 2nd class submersible on 4 August 1916, reclassified as 3rd class submarine on 1 April 1919; decommissioned on 1 April 1921.
