= Díaz Type C =

Type C

General information
- Type: Fighter
- National origin: Spain
- Manufacturer: Getafe
- Designer: Amalio Díaz
- Number built: 1

History
- First flight: April 1919

The Díaz Type C, (C standing for Caza - in Spanish, avion de caza refers to aircraft designed for air-to-air combat) was a Spanish fighter prototype in the late 1910s. It competed in the Concurso de Aviones in 1919.

== Development ==
The Type C was based on a 1917 design by Julio Adaro which was never completed. The aircraft itself was a two-bay equi-span biplane powered by a 180 hp Hispano-Suiza engine.

== Operational history ==
The Type C failed to qualify in the Concurso de Aviones in April 1919 at Cuatro Vientos as it did not meet the requirements set out by the specification from the Spanish Aviación Militar's fighter contest. The contest was later won by the Hispano Barrón. Only one was ever produced. Very little data for the Type C have survived.

== Specifications ==
General characteristics

- Crew: 1
- Powerplant: 1 × Hispano-Suiza 8Ab V-8 water-cooled piston engine, 134 kW (180 hp)

Performance
