= C Series Index =

Australian consumer price index 1921–1961

The C Series Index (or C Series) was a consumer price index constructed by the Australian Bureau of Statistics in 1921 (back calculated to 1914) and discontinued in 1961. It was notable for its role in centralised wage bargaining in Australia, and for the indexation of working class wages over an extended period of time.

== Adoption ==
Australia's Bureau of Statistics maintained an A Series Index of prices from 1912, back calculated to 1901, the date of Australian Federation. As a result of the 1920 Royal Inquiry into the Basic Wage the ABS developed the C Series Index of different price bundles. The importance of statistical price series was caused by the Australian basic wage, a conception of minimal requirements for a family of four or five, based on a single male unskilled wage earner, as given in the Harvester Judgement. The basic wage was a common component of almost all Australian workers' wages (supplemented in most cases by a margin paid for advanced skills by award), and due to inflation the judgement required periodic updating to account for inflation.

=== Adoption as a wage setting device ===
Despite being crafted as a result of a Royal Commission into basic wages, the C Series was only adopted by the courts as a basic wage adjusting measure in 1934 by the Commonwealth Court of Conciliation and Arbitration. Wages were then adjusted by the C Series by the Court until 1953 when indexation was discontinued. After indexation of wages based on the C Series was discontinued, trade unions and employee associations maintained demands for C Series wage indexation or wage indexation in general into the late 1960s.

== Coverage ==
The C Series Index covered, "food and groceries, house rents (4 and 5-roomed houses), clothing, household drapery, household utensils, fuel, lighting, urban transport fares, smoking and some miscellaneous items."

== Emendation and discontinuance ==
The C Series was emended in 1936 to reflect changed living requirements. Notably, in the post war environment, the C Series was not adjusted until its discontinuance.

== Bibliography ==
- Australian Bureau of Statistics, "History of retail/consumer price indexes in Australia" In Year Book Australia, 2005 (ABS 1301.0), Canberra, ACT: Australian Bureau of Statistics, 2005.
