= South Australian Railways C class =

Class of Australian 2-4-0 locomotives

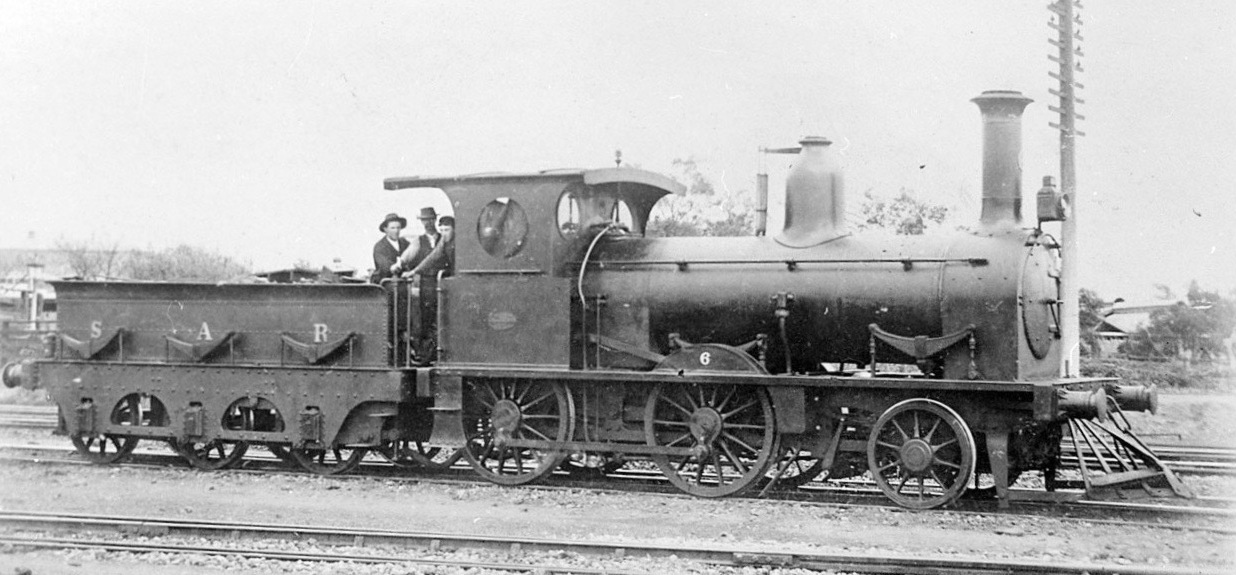
- South Australian Railways C class locomotive no. 6
Type and origin
- Power type: Steam
- Builder: Robert Stephenson and Company
- Order number: 1045, 1046
- Build date: 1856
- Total produced: 2
- Rebuilder: Islington Railway Workshops
- Rebuild date: 1884 (no. 5), 1885 & 1914 (no. 6)
- Number rebuilt: 2
Specifications
- Configuration
  - Whyte: 2-4-0
  - UIC: 1′B 3
- Gauge: 1600 mm (5 ft 3 in)
- Driver dia.: 4 ft 6 in (1372 mm)
- Length: 42 ft 10 in (13.06 m)
- Width: 7 ft 6 in (2286 mm) over running boards
- Height: 12 ft 8 in (3861 mm)
- Frame type: Plate
- Axle load: 9 long tons 9 cwt (9.6 t)
- Total weight: 42 long tons 1 cwt (42.7 t)
- Fuel type: Coal
- Fuel capacity: 3 long tons 15 3/4 cwt (3.85 t)
- Water cap.: 1060 imp gal (4800 L; 1270 US gal)
- Firebox
  - Grate area: 12.71 sq ft (1.181 m^{2})
- Boiler pressure: 130 lbf/in^{2} (0.90 MPa)
- Heating surface
  - Firebox: 73.1 sq ft (6.79 m^{2})
  - Tubes: 780 sq ft (72 m^{2})
- Cylinders: Two
- Cylinder size: 14 in × 20 in (356 mm × 508 mm)
Performance figures
- Tractive effort: Original: 7548 lbf (33.58 kN); As rebuilt: 8021 lbf (35.68 kN)
Career
- Operators: South Australian Railways
- Class: C
- Number in class: 2
- Numbers: 5 & 6
- First run: November 1856
- Withdrawn: 1906, 1926
- Disposition: All scrapped

The South Australian Railways C class locomotives were built by the Robert Stephenson and Company for the South Australian Railways in 1856. The first locomotive (no. 5) was in service by November 1856; the second (no. 6) by January 1857. They were both withdrawn after long service lives, with no. 5 being withdrawn after 50 years working on the SAR. No. 6 lasted well into Commissioner Webb's era, being withdrawn in 1926 at almost 70 years old.

== History ==
After the South Australian Railways had its new B class tank engines built to run on the railway line to Gawler, two more locomotives were purchased to also run this service on the lightly engineered line. These locomotives were designated the "C class". Their range was increased to include stops at Roseworthy and Kapunda following the opening of the new line extension in August 1860. The C class was later used in constructing the Tarlee line. In 1884 and 1885, both locomotives were rebuilt and put back into traffic, having acquired new cabs which were complete with circular front and side windows.

The C class worked on the northern lines until they were superseded by more powerful locomotives. No. 5 was condemned in 1906 at the age of 50 years; no. 6 continued to work on the suburban system and performed shunting duties at Mile End and Port Adelaide, eventually being withdrawn and scrapped in 1926 after 70 years of service.
