= Sony Vaio SR series =

The Sony Vaio SR series was a line of consumer-grade notebook computers from Sony introduced in July/August 2008 to replace the Sony Vaio C series range (they could also be seen as competing with the lower end SZ models), as a part of the Intel Centrino 2 launch. They are equipped with a 13.3" screen and weigh approximately 1.95kg, significantly lighter than the C series, similar to the non-premium carbon fiber models of the SZ, but significantly heavier than the Z Series (which, unlike the SR, uses carbon fiber to reduce weight).

As with the SZ and C series laptops, the SR uses a 16:10 ratio 1280x800 LED-backlit screen. All are configured with Intel Core 2 Duo CPUs and DDR2 RAM. SSD storage, instead of hard drive, is an option.

Base-line models feature integrated Intel 4500MHD graphics, while higher-end laptops are equipped with ATI Mobility Radeon HD 3470 graphics (in later models the ATI Mobility Radeon HD 4570 is the discrete graphics option). Compared with the higher-end Z series, which has GeForce 9300M GS graphics (producing less heat in the smaller chassis of the Z series), the ATI-equipped SR offers better gaming performance, marking it out as the consumer/gamer's option. The SR also features a 1.3 megapixel webcam to the 0.3 megapixel found on the Z.

Options available on the Z series that were not available on the SR are WWAN (HSDPA), and RAID SSD. CPU, RAM and hard drive options are the same on both models, and, as with the Z, the SR features a Blu-ray drive option.
