= Ha-3-class submarine =

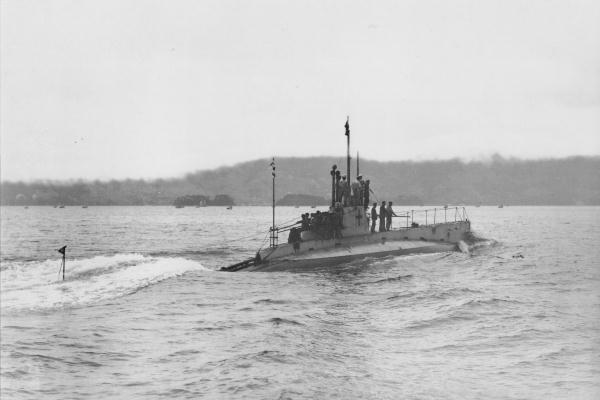
- Japanese submarine Ha-3, in August 1911

Class overview
- Name: Ha-3 class
- Builders: Vickers, Barrow-in-Furness, UK
- Operators: Imperial Japanese Navy
- Preceded by: Ha-1 class
- Succeeded by: Ha-7 class
- In commission: 1911–1929
- Completed: 3
- Retired: 3

General characteristics
- Type: Submarine
- Displacement: 291 long tons (296 t) surfaced; 326 long tons (331 t) submerged
- Length: 43.3 m (142 ft 1 in)
- Beam: 4.14 m (13 ft 7 in)
- Draft: 3.43 m (11 ft 3 in)
- Installed power: 600 hp (450 kW) (gasoline engines); 300 hp (220 kW) (electric motors)
- Propulsion: Gasoline engines; Electric motors; 1 shaft
- Speed: 12 knots (22 km/h; 14 mph) surfaced; 7 knots (13 km/h; 8.1 mph) submerged
- Range: 660 nmi (1,220 km; 760 mi) at 12 knots (surfaced); 60 nmi (110 km; 69 mi) at 4 knots (7.4 km/h; 4.6 mph) (submerged)
- Test depth: 30.5 m (100 ft)
- Complement: 26 officers and enlisted
- Armament: 2 × 18 in (460 mm) bow torpedo tubes (4 × torpedoes); 1 × machine gun

The Ha-3-class submarine (波三型潜水艦, Ha-san-gata sensuikan) was an early class of submarines of the Imperial Japanese Navy.

== Background ==
Along with placing orders with Vickers at Barrow-in-Furness in the UK for two British C-class submarines, which were commissioned into the Imperial Japanese Navy as the Ha-1 class, the Japanese government ordered another three vessels, which were received as knock-down kits. These kits were assembled at the Kure Naval Arsenal.

== Design ==
Physically almost identical to the Ha-1 class, the three vessels assembled in Japan incorporated a number of improvements, including extended bow for improved seaworthiness, improved rudder for surface handling, and an increase in the size of the bridge and conning tower.

== Ships in class ==
- Japanese submarine Ha-3 (波号第三潜水艦, Ha-go Dai-san sensuikan), laid down 1 August 1910; launched 5 March 1911; commissioned 12 August 1911 as Submersible No.10; reclassified as 2nd class submersible on 4 August 1916, reclassified as 3rd class submarine on 1 April 1919; renamed Ha-3 on 15 June 1923, decommissioned on 1 December 1929.
- Japanese submarine Ha-4 (波号第四潜水艦, Ha-go Dai-yon sensuikan), laid down 1 August 1910; launched 13 March 1911; commissioned 26 August 1911 as Submersible No.11; reclassified as 2nd class submersible on 4 August 1916, reclassified as 3rd class submarine on 1 April 1919; renamed Ha-4 on 15 June 1923; decommissioned on 1 December 1929.
- Japanese submarine Ha-5 (波号第五潜水艦, Ha-go Dai-go sensuikan), laid down 1 August 1910; launched 27 March 1911; commissioned 3 August 1911 as Submersible No.12; reclassified as 2nd class submersible on 4 August 1916, reclassified as 3rd class submarine on 1 April 1919; renamed Ha-5 on 15 June 1923; decommissioned on 1 December 1929.
