= Naimer =

Naimer may refer to:

- Kraus & Naimer, Austrian company producing switchgear, co-founded by Lorentz Naimer (1868–1944)
- Karen Naimer, Canadian lawyer
