= Arc flash =

Heat and light produced during an electrical arc fault

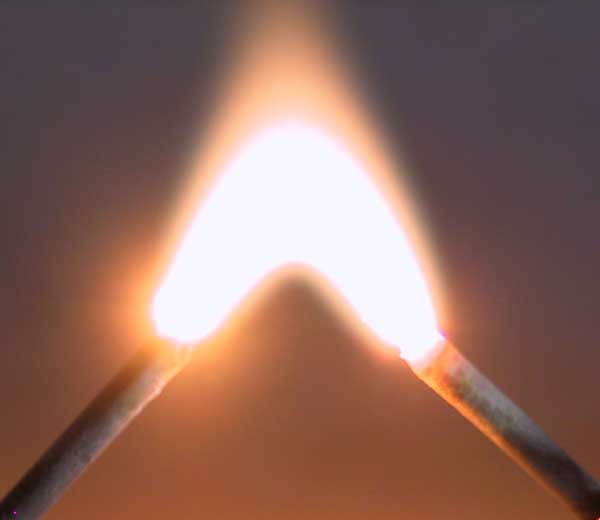
An electric arc between two nails

An arc flash is the light and heat produced as part of an arc fault (sometimes referred to as an electrical flashover), a type of electrical explosion or discharge that results from a connection through air to ground or another voltage phase in an electrical system.

Arc flash is different from the arc blast, which is the supersonic shockwave produced when the conductors and surrounding air are heated by the arc, becoming a rapidly expanding plasma. Both are part of the same arc fault, and are often referred to as simply an arc flash, but from a safety standpoint they are often treated separately. For example, personal protective equipment (PPE) can be used to effectively shield a worker from the radiation of an arc flash, but that same PPE may likely be ineffective against the flying objects, molten metal, and violent concussion that the arc blast can produce. (For example, category-4 arc-flash protection, similar to a bomb suit, is unlikely to protect a person from the concussion of a very large blast, although it may prevent the worker from being fatally burned by the intense light of the flash.) For this reason, other safety precautions are usually taken in addition to wearing PPE, helping to prevent injury. However, the phenomenon of the arc blast is sometimes used to extinguish the electric arc by some types of self-blast–chamber circuit breakers.

== Definition ==
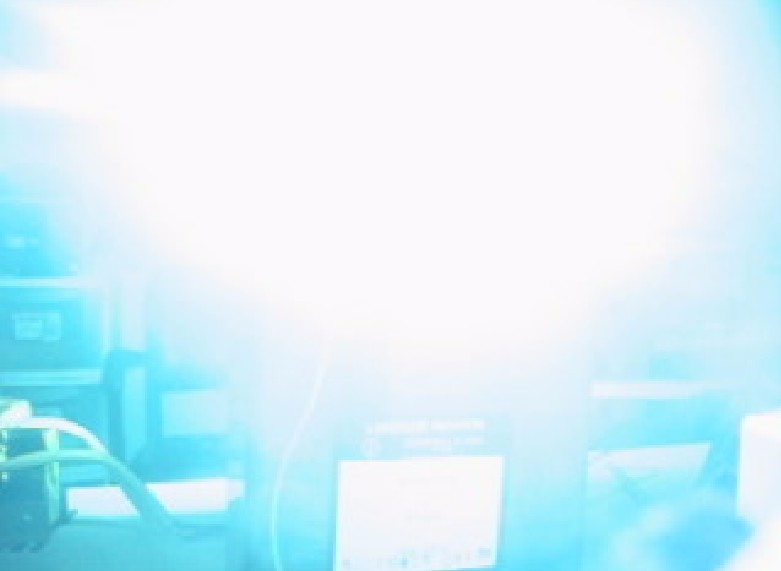
A controlled arc-flash, produced in a flashtube. Even though the energy level used is fairly low (85 joules), the low-impedance, low-inductance circuit produces a flash of 24,000,000 watts. With an arc temperature of 17,000 K (16,700 °C), the radiation output is centered at 170 nanometers, in the far UV. The intense burst of radiation easily penetrates the shade #10 welding filter which shields the camera.

An arc flash is the light and heat produced from an electric arc supplied with sufficient electrical energy to cause substantial damage, harm, fire, or injury. Electrical arcs experience negative incremental resistance, which causes the electrical resistance to decrease as the arc temperature increases. Therefore, as the arc develops and gets hotter the resistance drops, drawing more and more current (runaway) until some part of the system melts, trips, or evaporates, providing enough distance to break the circuit and extinguish the arc. Electrical arcs, when well controlled and fed by limited energy, produce very bright light, and are used in arc lamps (enclosed, or with open electrodes), for welding, plasma cutting, and other industrial applications. Welding arcs can easily turn steel into a liquid with an average of only 24 DC volts. When an uncontrolled arc forms at high voltages, and especially where large supply-wires or high-current conductors are used, arc flashes can produce deafening noises, supersonic concussive forces, super-heated shrapnel, temperatures far greater than the Sun's surface, and intense, high-energy radiation capable of vaporizing nearby materials.

Arc flash temperatures can reach or exceed 35,000 °F (19,400 °C) at the arc terminals. The massive energy released in the fault rapidly vaporizes the metal conductors involved, blasting molten metal and expanding plasma outward with extraordinary force. A typical arc flash incident can be inconsequential but could conceivably easily produce a more severe explosion (see calculation below). The result of the violent event can cause destruction of equipment involved, fire, and injury not only to an electrical worker but also to bystanders. During the arc flash, electrical energy vaporizes the metal, which changes from solid state to gas vapor, expanding it with explosive force. For example, when copper vaporizes it suddenly expands by a factor of 67,000 in volume.

In addition to the explosive blast, called the arc blast of such a fault, destruction also arises from the intense radiant heat produced by the arc. The metal plasma arc produces tremendous amounts of light energy from far infrared to ultraviolet. Surfaces of nearby objects, including people, absorb this energy and are instantly heated to vaporizing temperatures. The effects of this can be seen on adjacent walls and equipment – they are often ablated and eroded from the radiant effects.

== Examples ==
Most 400 V and above electrical services have sufficient capacity to cause an arc flash hazard. Medium-voltage equipment (above 1000 V) is higher potential and therefore a higher risk for an arc flash hazard. Higher voltages can cause a spark to jump, initiating an arc flash without the need for physical contact, and can sustain an arc across longer gaps. Most powerlines use voltages exceeding 1000 volts and can be an arc-flash hazard to birds, squirrels, people, or equipment such as vehicles or ladders. Arc flashes, as bright flashes like lightning that can be seen from long distances, are often witnessed from lines or transformers just before a power outage.

High-voltage powerlines often operate in the range of tens to hundreds of kilovolts, which can result in very long arc-flashes, often referred to as a flashover. Care must usually be taken to ensure that the lines are insulated with a proper "flashover rating" and sufficiently spaced from each other to prevent an arc flash from spontaneously developing. If the high-voltage lines become too close, either to each other or ground, a corona discharge may form between the conductors. This is typically a blue or reddish light caused by ionization of the air, accompanied by a hissing or frying sound. The corona discharge can easily lead to an arc flash, by creating a conductive pathway between the lines. This ionization can be enhanced during electrical storms, causing spontaneous arc-flashes and leading to power outages.

As an example of the energy released in an arc flash incident, in a single phase-to-phase fault on a 480 V system with 20,000 amps of fault current, the resulting power is 9.6 MW. If the fault lasts for 10 cycles at 60 Hz, the resulting energy would be 1.6 megajoules. For comparison, TNT releases 2,175 J/g or more when detonated (a conventional value of 4,184 J/g is used for TNT equivalent). Thus, this fault energy is equivalent to 380 grams (approximately 0.8 pounds) of TNT. The character of an arc flash blast is quite different from a chemical explosion (more heat and light, less mechanical shock), but the resulting devastation is comparable. The rapidly expanding superheated vapor produced by the arc can cause serious injury or damage, and the intense UV, visible, and IR light produced by the arc can temporarily and sometimes even permanently blind or cause eye damage to people.

There are four different arc flash type events to be assessed when designing safety programs:

- Open air
- Ejected
- Equipment focused (arc-in-a-box)
- Tracking

== Precautions ==
=== Switching ===
One of the most common causes of arc-flash injuries happens when switching on electrical circuits and, especially, tripped circuit-breakers. A tripped circuit-breaker often indicates a fault has occurred somewhere down the line from the panel. The fault must usually be isolated before switching the power on, or an arc flash can easily be generated. Small arcs usually form in switches when the contacts first touch, and can provide a place for an arc flash to develop. If the voltage is high enough, and the wires leading to the fault are large enough to allow a substantial amount of current, an arc flash can form within the panel when the breaker is turned on. Generally, either an electric motor with shorted windings or a shorted power-transformer is the culprit, being capable of drawing the energy needed to sustain a dangerous arc-flash. Motors over two horsepower usually have magnetic starters, to both isolate the operator from the high-energy contacts and to allow disengagement of the contactor if the breaker trips.

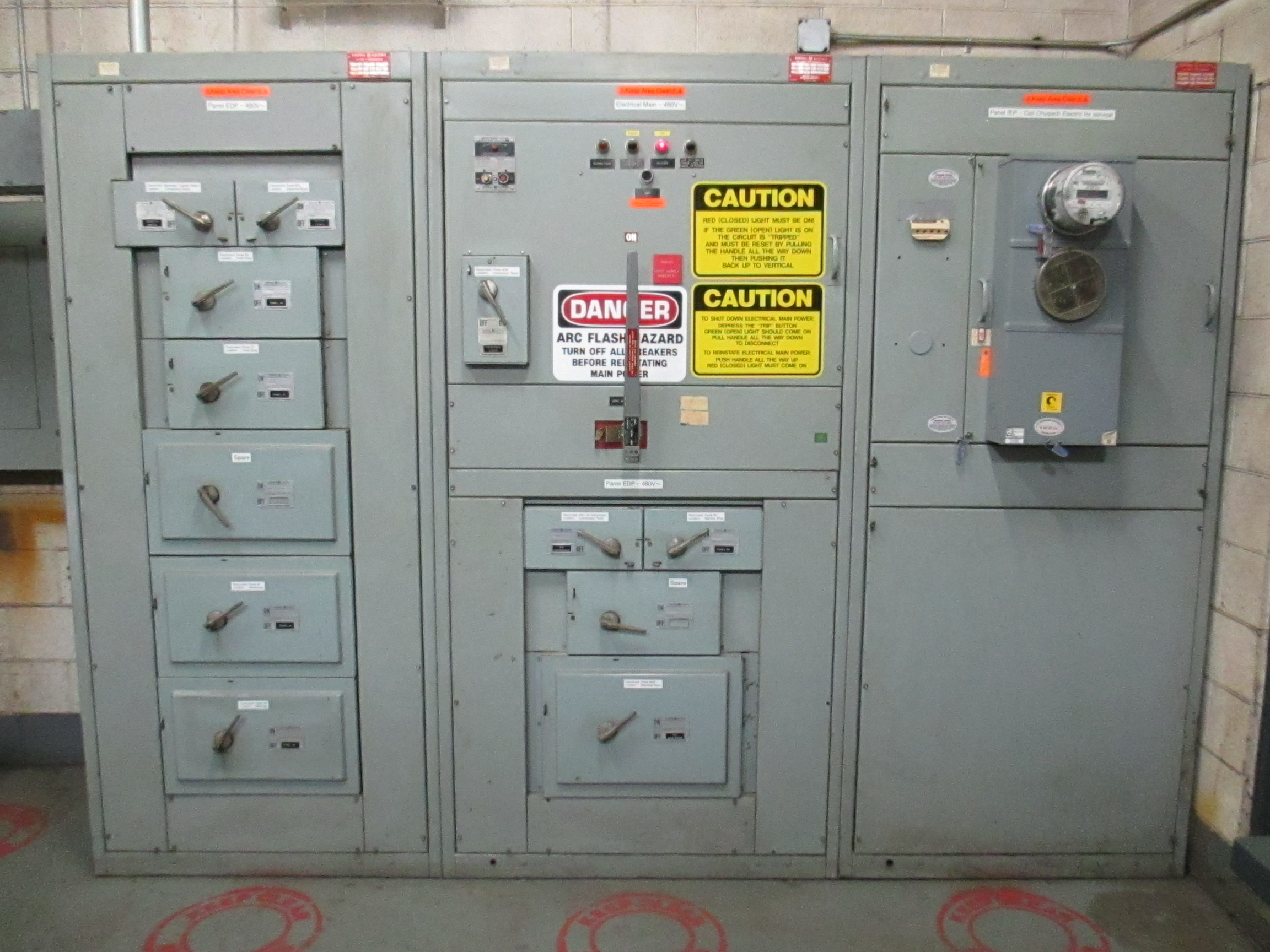
A 480 volt switchgear and distribution panel, requiring category-4 arc-flash protection

Circuit breakers are often the primary defense against current runaway, especially if there are no secondary fuses, so if an arc flash develops in a breaker there may be nothing to stop a flash from going out of control. Once an arc flash begins in a breaker, it can quickly migrate from a single circuit to the busbars of the panel itself, allowing very high energies to flow. Precautions must usually be used when switching circuit breakers, such as standing off to the side while switching to keep the body out of the way, wearing protective clothing, or turning off equipment, circuits and panels downline prior to switching. Very large switchgear is often able to handle very high energies and, thus, many places require the use of full protective equipment before switching one on.

In addition to the heat, light and concussive forces, an arc flash also produces a cloud of plasma and ionized particles. When inhaled, this ionized gas can cause severe burns to the airways and lungs. The charged plasma may also be attracted to metallic objects worn by people in the vicinity, such as earrings, belt buckles, keys, body jewelry, or the frames of glasses, causing severe localized burns. When switching circuits, a technician should take care to remove any metals from their body, hold their breath, and close their eyes. An arc flash is more likely to form in a switch that is closed slowly, by allowing time for an arc to form between the contacts, so it is usually more desirable to "throw" switches with a fast motion, quickly and firmly making good contact. High-current switches often have a system of springs and levers or even pneumatic assists to assist with this.

=== Live testing ===
When testing in energized high-power circuits, technicians will observe precautions for care and maintenance of testing equipment and to keep the area clean and free of debris. A technician would use protective equipment such as rubber gloves and other personal protective equipment, to avoid initiating an arc and to protect personnel from any arc that may start while testing.

== Protecting personnel ==
A video describing the dangers of arc flashes and measures that can be taken to reduce risk to workers

There are many methods of protecting personnel from arc flash hazards. This can include personnel wearing arc flash personal protective equipment (PPE) or modifying the design and configuration of electrical equipment. The best way to remove the hazards of an arc flash is to de-energize electrical equipment when interacting with it; however, de-energizing electrical equipment is in and of itself an arc flash hazard. In this case, one of the newest solutions is to allow the operator to stand far back from the electrical equipment by operating equipment remotely; this can be done with equipment that has remotely operated switches or with remote racking.

=== Arc flash protection equipment ===
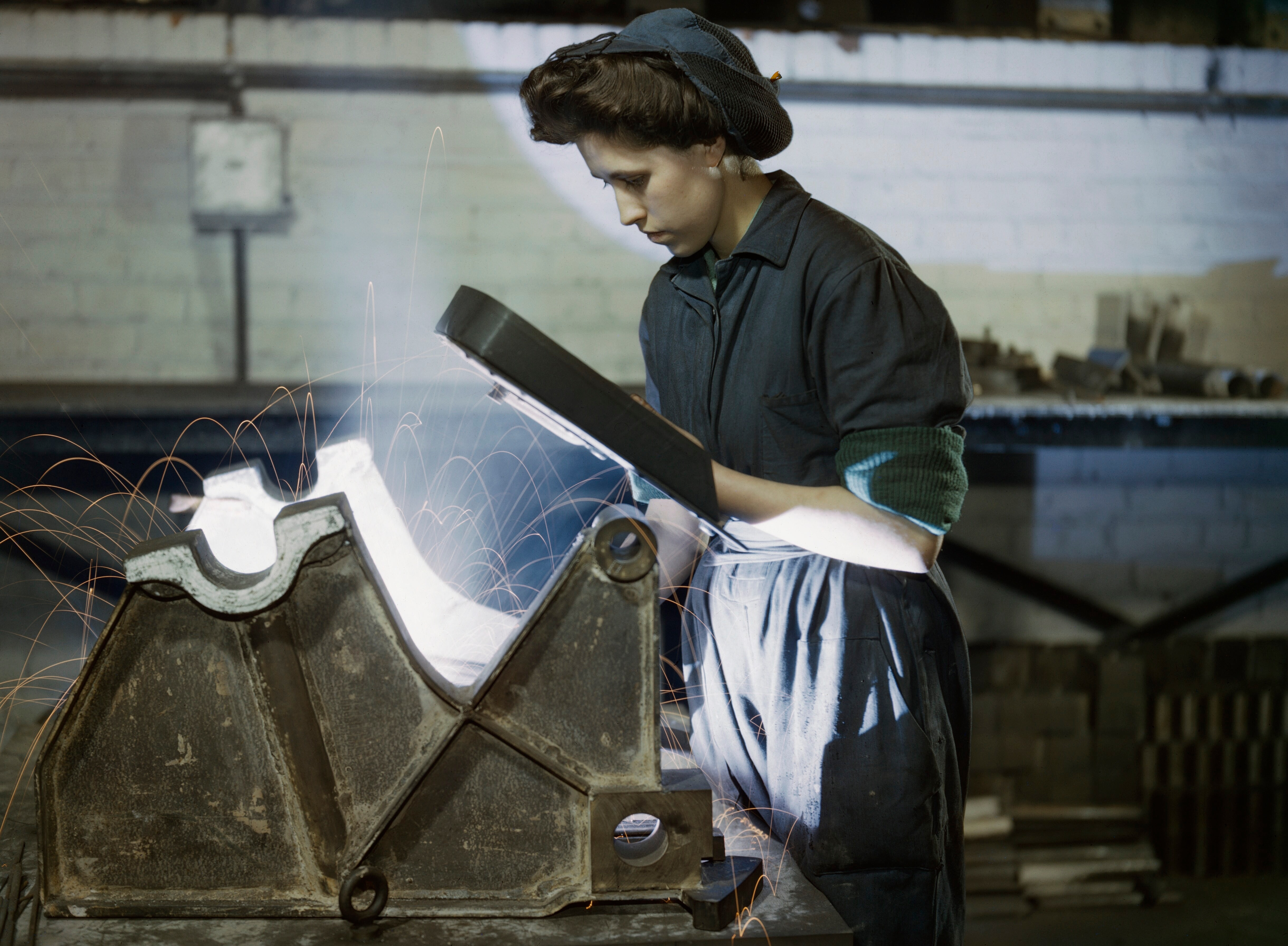
A welder protecting her eyes with a shield with an optical filter, like those in welding helmets, during World War II. The light from the arc flash is visible on her boilersuit and the wall in the background.

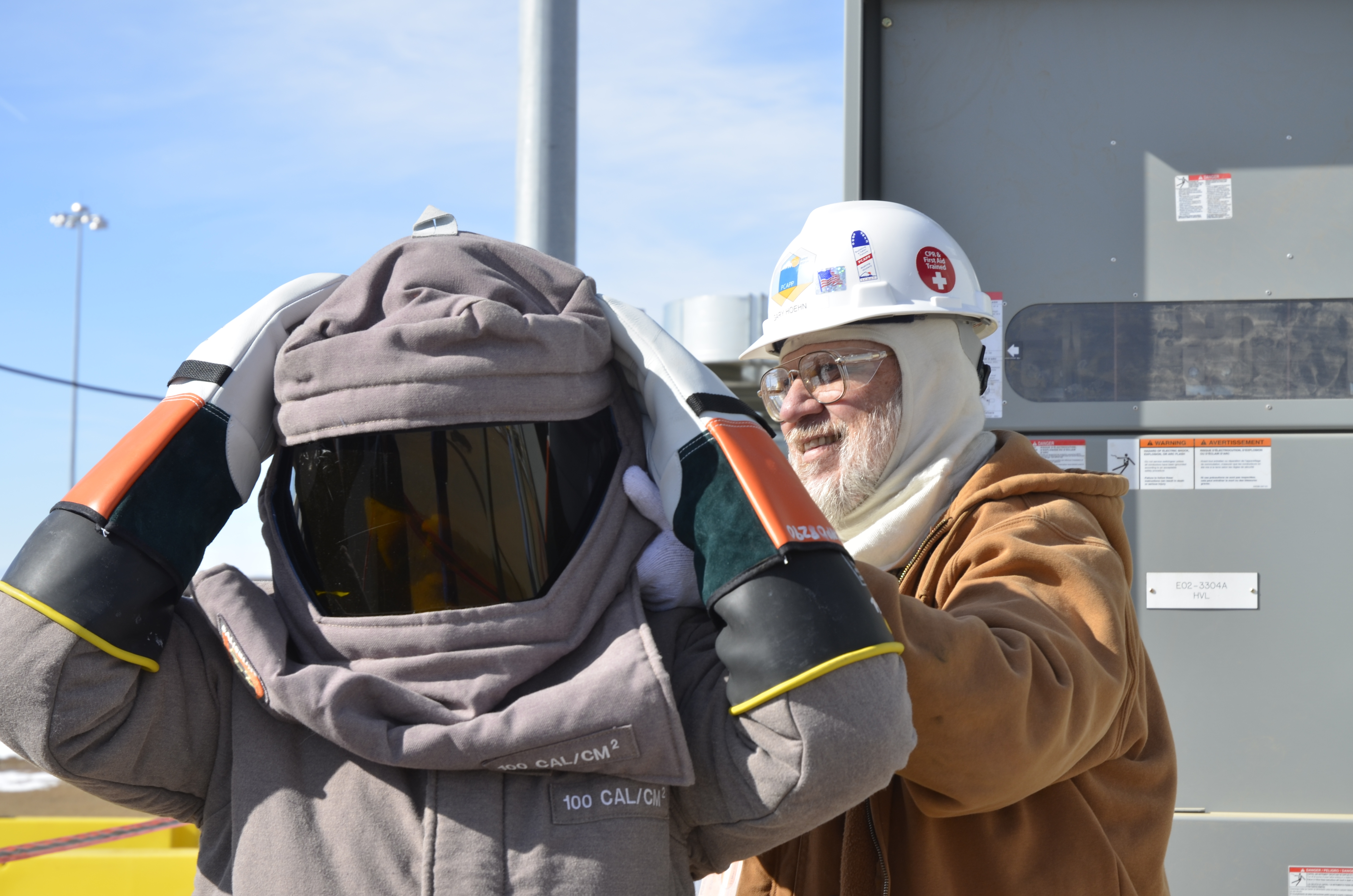
An electrician assists a fellow worker to suit up in special arc flash protection gear in preparation for an electrical inspection.

With recent increased awareness of the dangers of arc flash, there have been many companies that offer arc flash personal protective equipment (PPE), such as suits, overalls, helmets, boots, and gloves.

The effectiveness of protective equipment is measured by its arc rating. The arc rating is the maximum incident energy resistance demonstrated by a material prior to breakopen (a hole in the material) or necessary to pass through and cause a 50% probability of second degree burns. Arc rating is normally expressed in cal/cm^{2} (or small calories of heat energy per square centimeter). The tests for determining arc rating are defined in ASTM F1506 Standard Performance Specification for Flame Resistant Textile Materials for Wearing Apparel for Use by Electrical Workers Exposed to Momentary Electric Arc and Related Thermal Hazards.

The selection of appropriate PPE, given a certain task to be performed, is normally handled in one of two possible ways. The first method is to consult a hazard category classification table, like that found in NFPA 70E. Table 130.7(C)(15)(a) lists a number of typical electrical tasks by various voltage levels and recommends the category of PPE that should be worn. For example, when working on 600 V switchgear and performing a removal of bolted covers to expose bare, energized parts, the table recommends a Category 3 Protective Clothing System. This Category 3 system corresponds to an ensemble of PPE that together offers protection up to 25 cal/cm^{2} (105 J/cm^{2}; 1.05 MJ/m^{2}). The minimum rating of PPE necessary for any category is the maximum available energy for that category. For example, a Category 3 arc-flash hazard requires PPE rated for no less than 25 cal/cm^{2} (1.05 MJ/m^{2}).

The second method of selecting PPE is to perform an arc flash hazard calculation to determine the available incident arc energy. IEEE 1584 provides a guide to perform these calculations given that the maximum fault current, duration of faults, and other general equipment information is known. Once the incident energy is calculated the appropriate ensemble of PPE that offers protection greater than the energy available can be selected.

PPE provides protection after an arc flash incident has occurred and should be viewed as the last line of protection. Reducing the frequency and severity of incidents should be the first option and this can be achieved through a complete arc flash hazard assessment and through the application of technology such as high-resistance grounding which has been proven to reduce the frequency and severity of incidents.

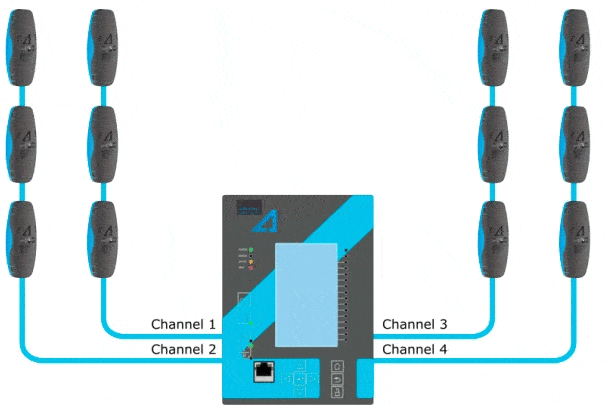
Example of IED equipped with arc protection

=== Reducing hazard by design ===
Three key factors determine the intensity of an arc flash on personnel. These factors are the quantity of fault current available in a system, the time until an arc flash fault is cleared, and the distance an individual is from a fault arc. Various design and equipment configuration choices can be made to affect these factors and in turn reduce the arc flash hazard.

==== Fault current ====
Fault current can be limited by using current limiting devices such as current limiting breakers, grounding resistors, arc suppression coils or fuses. If the fault current is limited to 5 amperes or less, then many ground faults self-extinguish and do not propagate into phase-to-phase faults.

==== Arcing time ====
Arcing time can be reduced by temporarily setting upstream protective devices to lower setpoints during maintenance periods, or by employing zone-selective interlocking protection (ZSIP). With zone-selective interlocking, a downstream breaker that detects a fault communicates with an upstream breaker to delay its instantaneous tripping function. In this way "selectivity" will be preserved, in other words faults in the circuit are cleared by the breaker nearest to the fault, minimizing the effect on the entire system. A fault on a branch circuit will be detected by all breakers upstream of the fault (closer to the source of power). The circuit breaker closest to the downstream fault will send a restraining signal to prevent upstream breakers from tripping instantaneously. The presence of the fault will nevertheless activate the preset trip delay timer(s) of the upstream circuit breaker(s); this will allow an upstream circuit breaker to interrupt the fault, if still necessary after the preset time has elapsed. The ZSIP system allows faster instantaneous trip settings to be used, without loss of selectivity. The faster trip times reduce the total energy in an arc fault discharge.

Arcing time can significantly be reduced by protection based on detection of arc-flash light. Optical detection is often combined with overcurrent information. Light and current based protection can be set up with dedicated arc-flash protective relays, or by using normal protective relays equipped with an add-on arc-flash option.

One of the most efficient means to reduce arcing time is to use an active arc flash mitigation device, e.g., an ultra-fast earthing switch (UFES). This type of arc flash mitigation device operates rapidly within a few milliseconds, creating a three-phase short-circuit to ground, which safely redirects fault currents away from the location of the arc flash. Upon activation by an external relay, a fast-moving contact pin makes physical contact with the energized bus, creating the short circuit. By redirecting the fault current, this action provides robust protection for personnel in close proximity to the arc flash and limits damage to equipment by reducing the exposure time to the high-energy event. After operation, the single-use contact pin needs to be replaced, while the main unit remains intact.

Another way to mitigate arc flash is to use a triggered current limiter or commutating current limiter which inserts a low rated continuous current limiting fuse that melts and interrupts the arc flash within 4 ms. The advantage of this device is that it eliminates the arc flash at the source and does not divert it to another section of the system. A triggered current limiter will always be "Current Limiting" which means it will interrupt the circuit before the first peak current occurs. These devices are electronically controlled and sensed and provide feedback to the user about their operational status. They can also be turned ON and OFF as desired. These devices must be replaced after an operation.

==== Distance ====
The radiant energy released by an electric arc is capable of permanently injuring or killing a human being at distances of up to 20 feet (6.1 m). The distance from an arc flash source within which an unprotected person has a 50% chance of receiving a second degree burn is referred to as the "flash protection boundary". The incident energy of 1.2 cal/cm^{2} on a bare skin was selected in solving the equation for the arc flash boundary in IEEE 1584. The IEEE 1584 arc flash boundary equations can also be used to calculate the arc flash boundaries with boundary energy other than 1.2 cal/cm^{2} such as onset to 2nd degree burn energy. Those conducting flash hazard analyses must consider this boundary, and then must determine what PPE should be worn within the flash protection boundary. Remote operators or robots can be used to perform activities that have a high risk for arc flash incidents, such as inserting draw-out circuit breakers on a live electrical bus. Remote racking systems are available which keep the operator outside the arc flash hazard zone.

== Research ==
Both the Institute of Electrical and Electronics Engineers (IEEE) and the National Fire Protection Association (NFPA) have joined forces in an initiative to fund and support research and testing to increase the understanding of arc flash. The results of this collaborative project will provide information that will be used to improve electrical safety standards, predict the hazards associated with arcing faults and accompanying arc blasts, and provide practical safeguards for employees in the workplace.

== Standards ==
- OSHA Standards 29 CFR, Parts 1910 and 1926. Occupational Safety and Health Standards. Part 1910, subpart S (electrical) §§ 1910.332 through 1910.335 contain generally applicable requirements for safety-related work practices. On April 11, 2014, OSHA adopted revised standards for electric power generation, transmission, and distribution work at part 1910, § 1910.269 and part 1926, subpart V, which contain requirements for arc flash protection and guidelines for assessing arc-flash hazards, making reasonable estimates of incident heat energy from electric arcs, and selecting appropriate protective equipment (79 FR 20316 et seq., April 11, 2014). All of these OSHA standards reference NFPA 70E.
- The National Fire Protection Association (NFPA) Standard 70 "The National Electrical Code" (NEC) contains requirements for warning labels.
- NFPA 70E provides guidance on implementing appropriate work practices that are required to safeguard workers from injury while working on or near exposed electrical conductors or circuit parts that could become energized.
- The Canadian Standards Association's CSA Z462 Arc Flash Standard is Canada's version of NFPA70E. Released in 2008.
- The Underwriters Laboratories of Canada's Standard on Electric Utility Workplace Electrical Safety for Generation, Transmission, and Distribution CAN/ULC S801.
- The Institute of Electronics and Electrical Engineers IEEE 1584.

== Notable incidents ==
In a notable industrial accident at an Astoria, Queens Con Edison substation on December 27, 2018 a 138,000 volt coupling capacitor potential device failed, resulting in an arc flash which in turn burned aluminum, lighting up the sky with a blue-green spectacle visible for miles around. The event was extensively covered in social media and LaGuardia Airport temporarily lost power, but there were neither deaths nor injuries.
