= AuCom Electronics =

AuCom Electronics Ltd
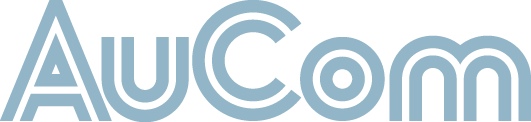
- Company type: Limited company
- Industry: Industrial switchgear
- Founded: 1978
- Founder: Ray Archer & Mark Empson
- Headquarters: Christchurch, New Zealand
- Products: Soft starters, switchgear
- Website: www.aucom.com

AuCom Electronics Ltd is a global company headquartered in Christchurch, New Zealand. It is one of the top 50 technology exporters in New Zealand.

== History ==
AuCom was established in 1978 by engineer Mark Empson and entrepreneur Ray Archer. The company was originally set up to manufacture a range of top end stereo amplifiers, but was also involved in the design energy saving devices for single and three phase induction motors.

AuCom Electronics began manufacturing these energy saving devices under licence from American space agency NASA. From this technology AuCom developed a range of commercially viable soft starters.

AuCom has since expanded its range to include a wider range of industrial electronics, motor control centres and switchgear.

On 17 December 2019 AuCom Electronics Ltd merged with Benshaw Inc. as part of Unico Technologies Group. Unico Technologies Group was founded by Sun Capital when it acquired Benshaw and Unico Drives from Regal Beloit Corporation in 2019. Both AuCom and Benshaw will continue to operate under their own brand names.

== Sales and distribution ==
AuCom has sales offices in New Zealand, Germany, USA, China, and Dubai. It has over 40 distributors in more than 80 countries throughout the world.

== Products ==
Some examples of AuCom's industrial motor control offerings are:

- Low Voltage Soft Starters: EMX4, EMX3, CSXi, CSX, IMS2
- Medium Voltage Soft Starters: MVS, MVX, MVE
