= True DC =

Type of Switch Disconnect

True DC is a type of switch disconnect (isolator) used in solar photovoltaic installations, in accordance with EN 60364–7–712. It was created by UK based IMO Precision Controls Ltd, and later adopted by other manufacturers such as Senton and ABB. The isolator design ensures a very fast break/make action by incorporating a user-independent switching action. As the handle is moved, it interacts with a spring mechanism causing the contacts to "snap" over upon reaching a set point. This mechanism means that the disconnection of the load circuits and the suppression of the electrical arc, produced by a constant DC load, is normally extinguished in a maximum of 5 milliseconds (MS), using the specific pole suppression chambers incorporated into the design.

Many alternative solutions, particularly those based upon an AC Switch Disconnect design which use bridge contacts, have been modified and rated for DC operation. These types of products have a switching speed that is directly linked to the operator speed, therefore slow operation of the handle results in slow contact separation of the contacts which can produce arcing times of 100 MS or more. Additionally in these switches, the contact surface is also the surface upon which electrical arcs tend to form, therefore any surface damage or shooting caused by arcing is likely to have a detrimental effect on the isolators contact resistance and its longevity.

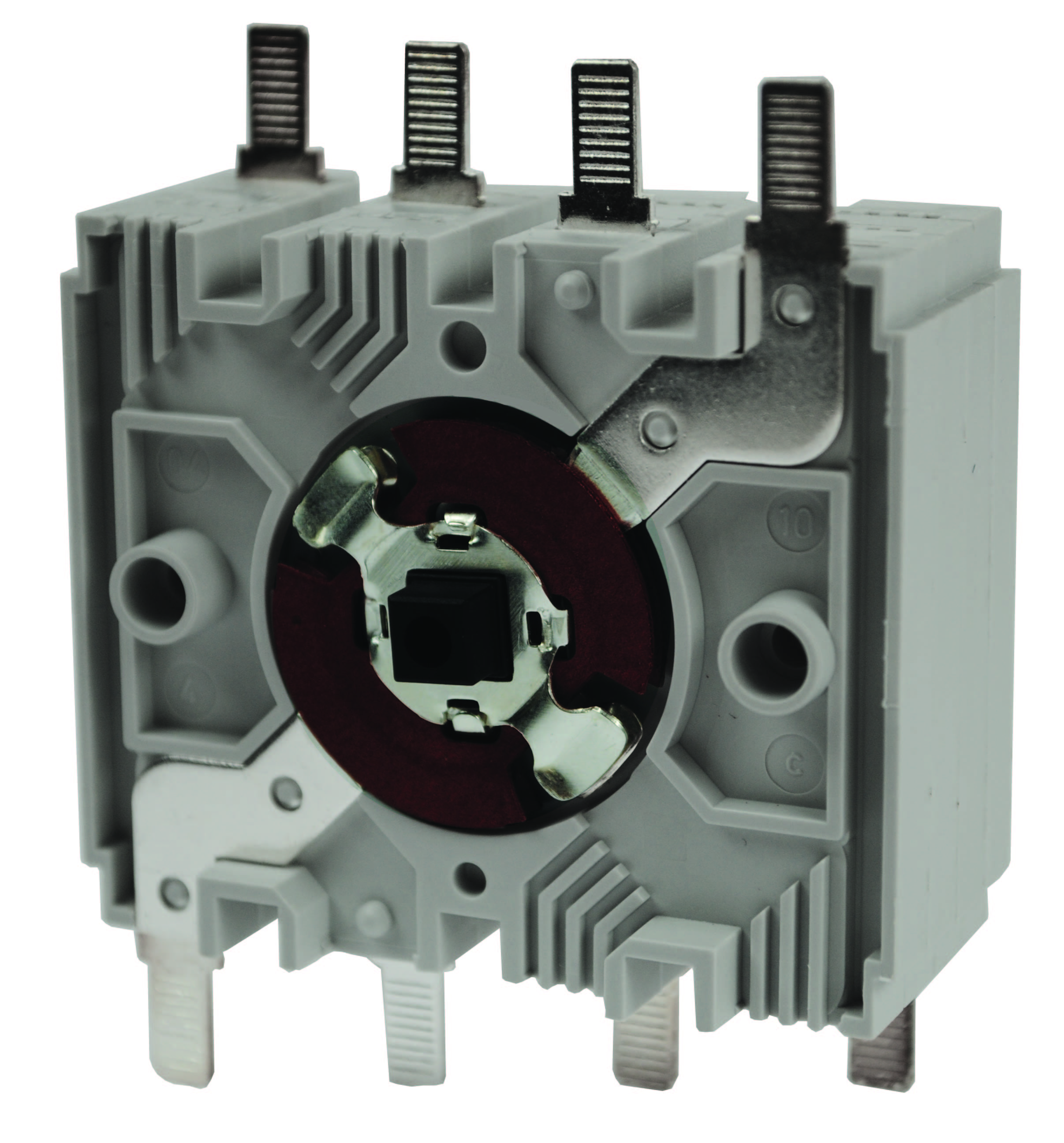
Rotary "Knife Contacts" found in True DC isolators

True DC Solar Isolators use a rotary knife contact mechanism, so when the unit is operated, the handle movement gives a double make/break per contact set. As DC load switching creates electrical arcing, the design is such that this only occurs on the corners of the switching parts meaning that the main contact is made on an area where no arcing has occurred. The rotary contact mechanism methodology used in True DC solar isolators means that when the isolator is operated, a self-cleaning action occurs on the arcing points and contact surfaces thereby producing high-vibration resistant contact integrity, with reduced contact resistance. This contact system ensures that power loss per pole is kept as low as possible, and is consistent over the life of the product.

The overall design of a True DC solar isolator is satisfactory for use in installations classified as either DC-21A, DC-21B or DC-22A, and so suitable for a high number of "off load" operations (without current) and also a high number of operating cycles "on load" (with current).

A further advantage of the True DC mechanism is that, in the event of the supply to earth failure, the high short circuit current pulls the contacts together, thereby giving high short circuit withstand current of up to 2400 A (product dependent). Residential photovoltaic installations are typically 1000 V DC, however the majority of the True DC isolators available on the market today already have the capability to operate up to 1500 V DC.

In the move towards safer installations of PV systems, whether it be in a domestic or industrial environment, consideration has to often be given to the materials and the risk of fire hazard that they pose. Ratings referred to under the UL 94 category are deemed generally acceptable for compliance with this requirement as this cover tests for flammability of polymeric materials used for parts in devices and appliances. Although there are 12 flame classifications specified in UL 94, there are 6 which relate to materials commonly used in manufacturing enclosures, structural parts and insulators found in consumer electronic products. These are 5VA, 5VB, V-0, V-1, V-2 and HB.

With the advent of more worldwide installations, and the requirements laid down in many countries' national wiring publications for the use of DC switches in PV installations, True DC Solar Isolators are assessed and tested under the latest UL standard UL508I which has been specifically written to cover the use of “Manual Disconnect Switches intended for use in Photovoltaic Systems”.

This UL508I standard specifically covers switches rated up to 1500 V that are intended for use in an ambient temperatures of -20 °C to +60 °C, and that are suitable for use on the load side of PV branch protection devices.
