= Switchgear =

Control gear of an electric power system

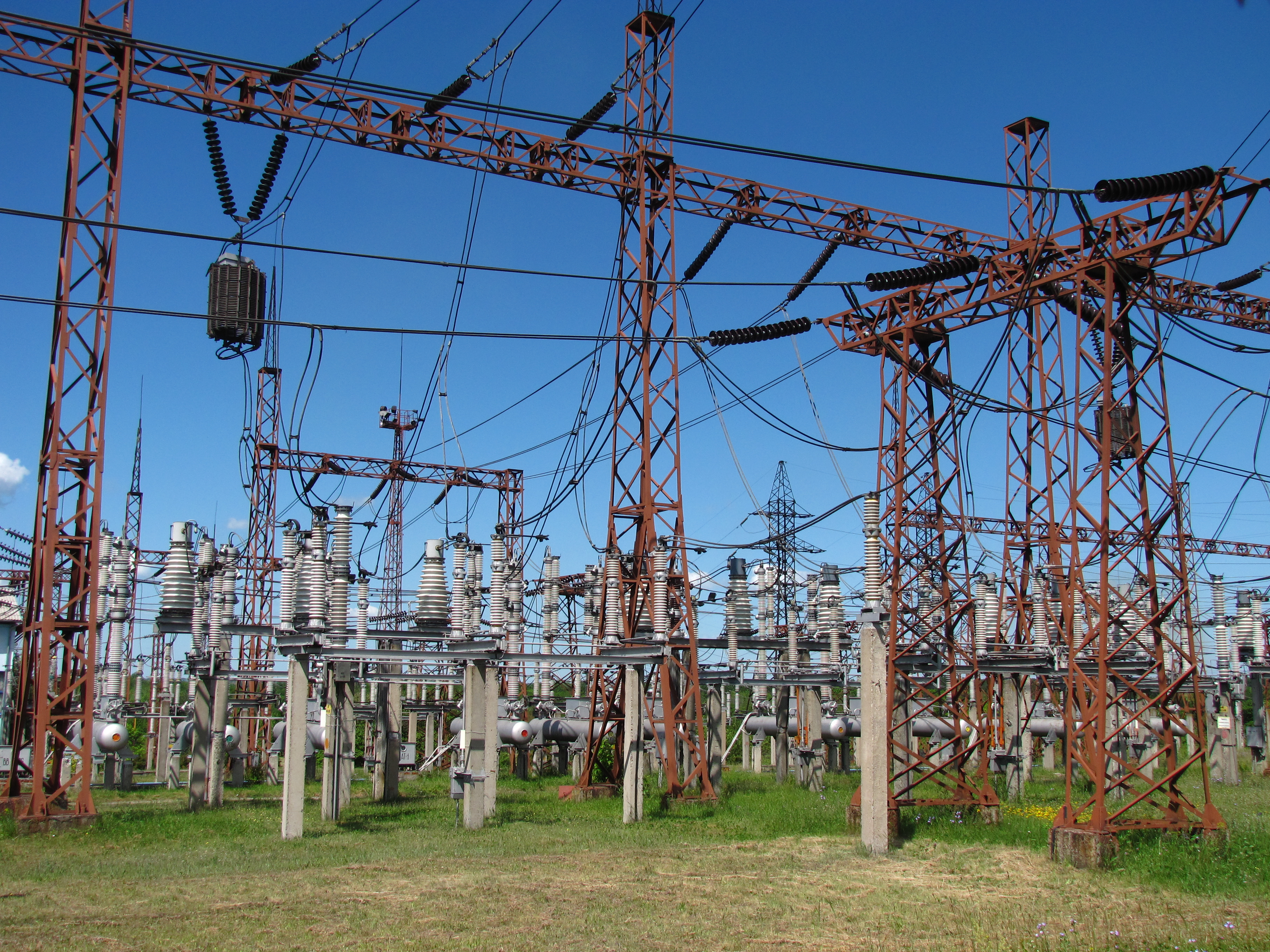
High-voltage switchgear

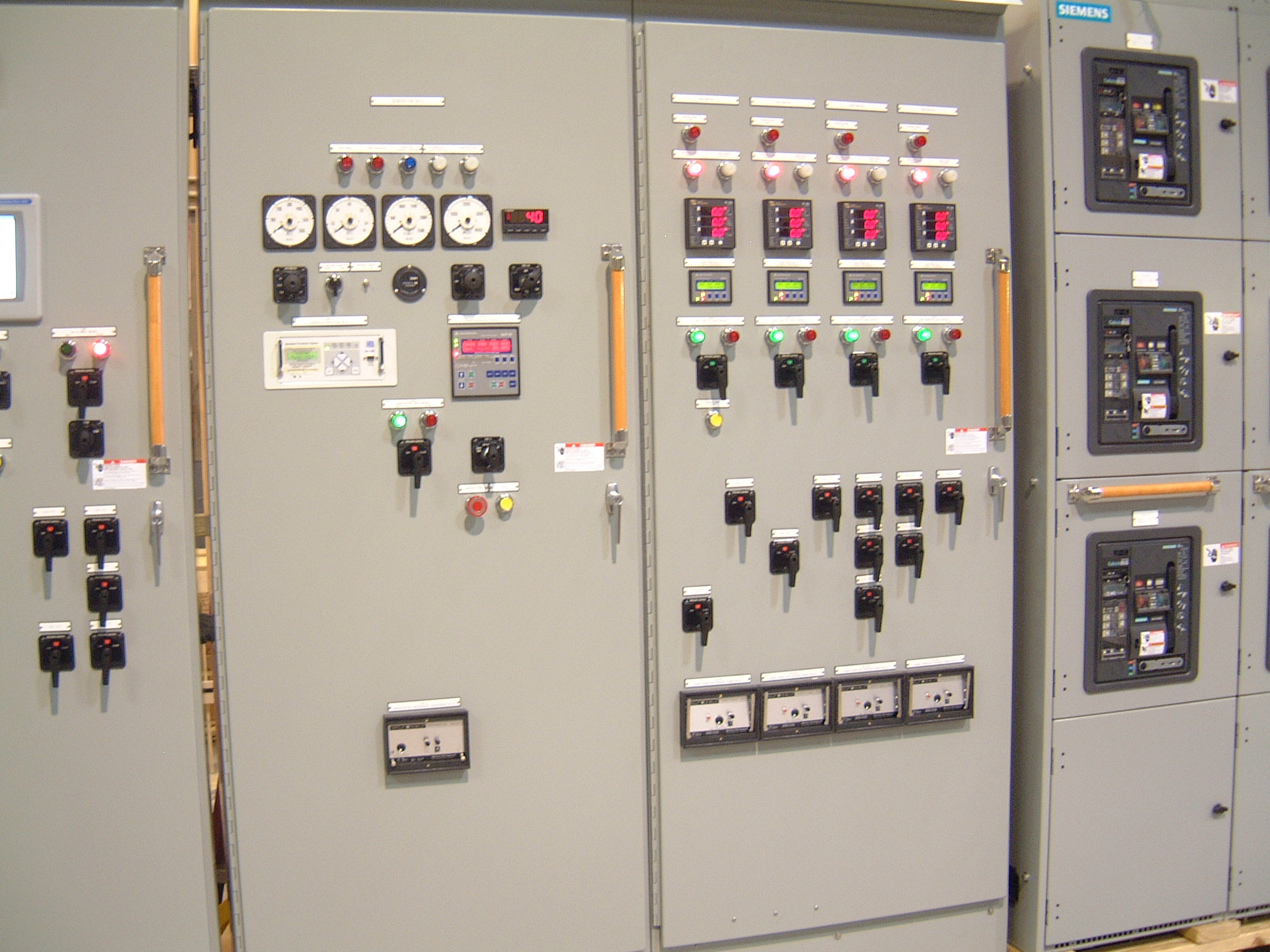
A section of a large switchgear panel

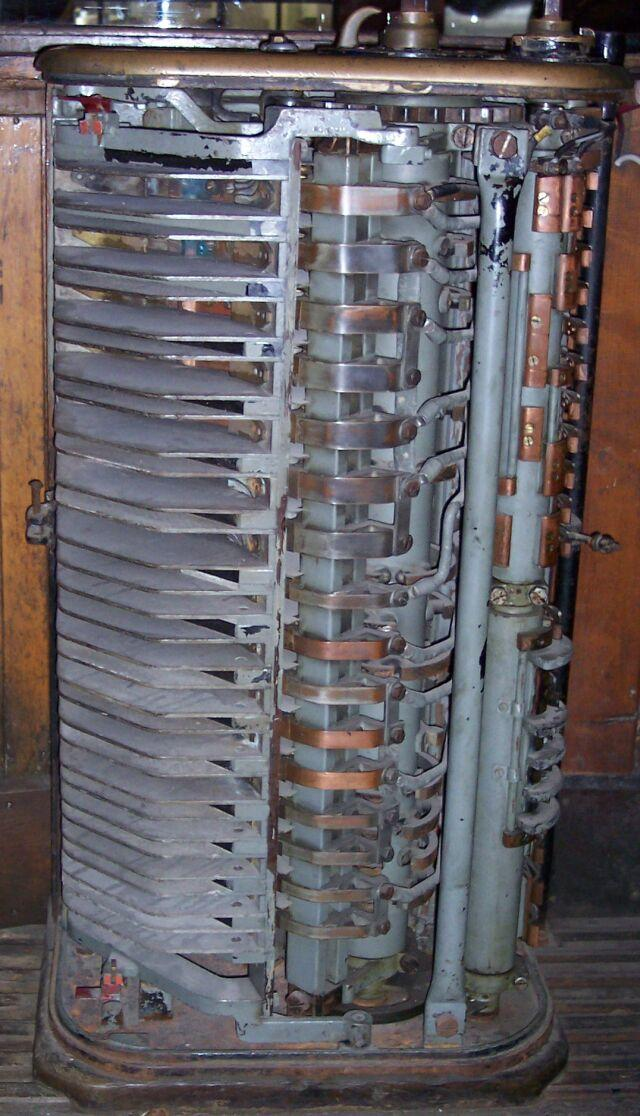
Tram switchgear

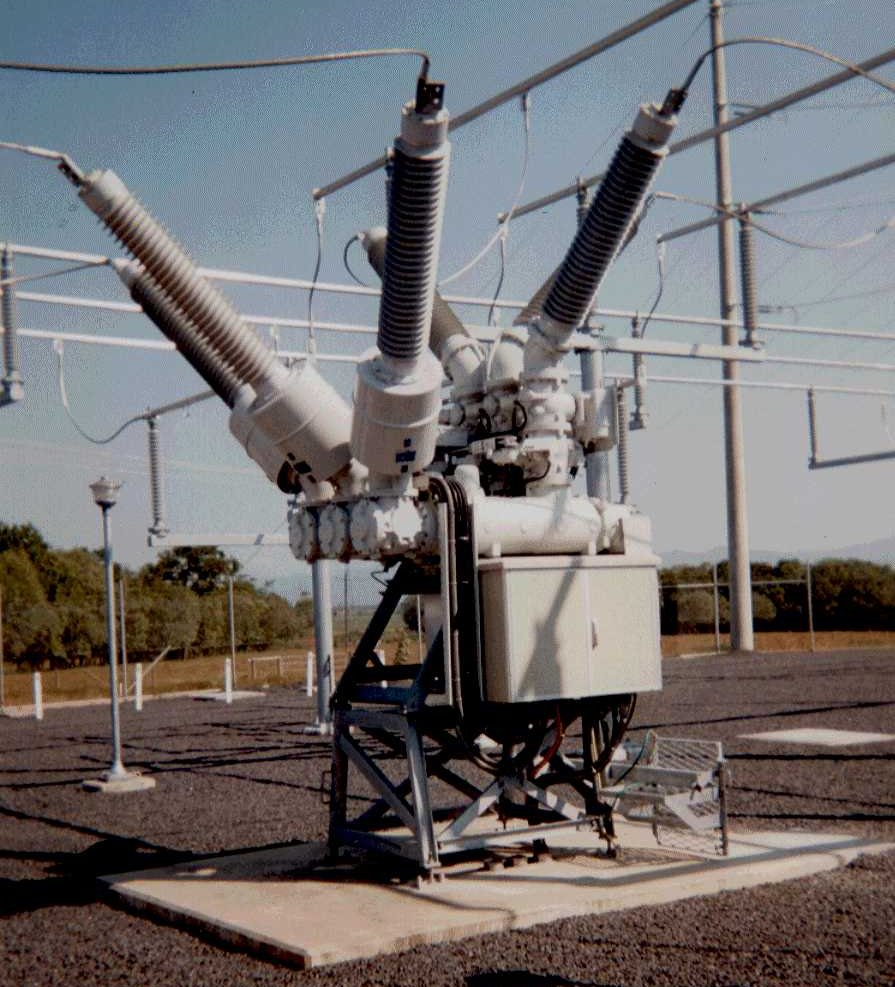
This circuit breaker uses both SF_{6} and air as insulation.

In an electric power system, a switchgear is composed of electrical disconnect switches, fuses or circuit breakers used to control, protect and isolate electrical equipment. Switchgear is used both to de-energize equipment to allow work to be done and to clear faults downstream. This type of equipment is directly linked to the reliability of the electricity supply.

The earliest central power stations used simple open knife switches, mounted on insulating panels of marble or asbestos. Power levels and voltages rapidly escalated, making opening manually operated switches too dangerous for anything other than isolation of a de-energized circuit. Oil-filled switchgear equipment allows arc energy to be contained and safely controlled. By the early 20th century, a switchgear line-up would be a metal-enclosed structure with electrically operated switching elements using oil circuit breakers. Today, oil-filled equipment has largely been replaced by air-blast, vacuum, or SF_{6} equipment, allowing large currents and power levels to be safely controlled by automatic equipment.

High-voltage switchgear was invented at the end of the 19th century for operating motors and other electric machines. The technology has been improved over time and can now be used with voltages up to 1,100 kV.

Typically, switchgear in substations is located on both the high- and low-voltage sides of large power transformers. The switchgear on the low-voltage side of the transformers may be located in a building, with medium-voltage circuit breakers for distribution circuits, along with metering, control, and protection equipment. For industrial applications, a transformer and switchgear line-up may be combined in one housing, called a unitized substation (USS). According to the latest research by Visiongain, a market research company, the worldwide switchgear market is expected to achieve $152.5 billion by 2029 at a CAGR of 5.9%. Growing investment in renewable energy and enhanced demand for safe and secure electrical distribution systems are expected to generate the increase.

== Components ==
A switchgear assembly has two types of components:

- Power-conducting components, such as switches, circuit breakers, fuses, and lightning arrestors, that conduct or interrupt the flow of electrical power.
- Control systems such as control panels, current transformers, potential transformers, protective relays, and associated circuitry, that monitor, control, and protect the power-conducting components.

== Functions ==
One of the basic functions of switchgear is protection, which is interruption of short-circuit and overload fault currents while maintaining service to unaffected circuits. Switchgear also provides isolation of circuits from power supplies. Switchgear is further used to enhance system availability by allowing more than one source to feed a load.

== History ==
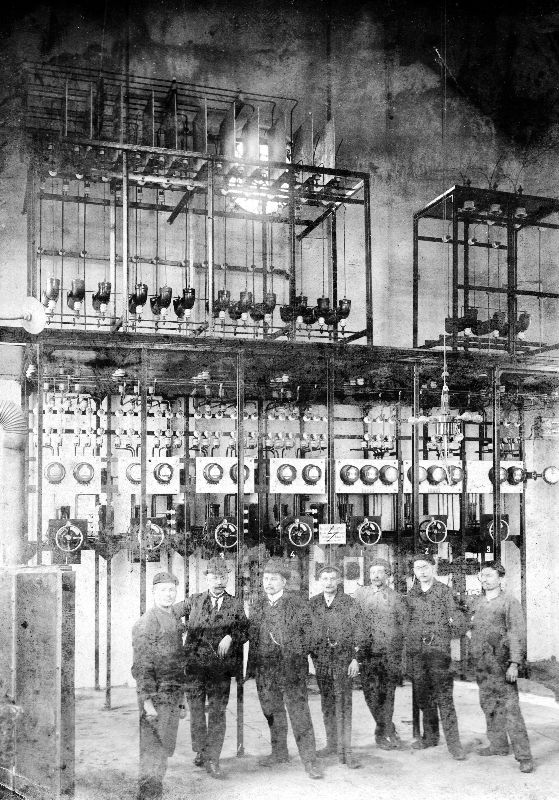
Early switchgear (about 1910)

Switchgear is as old as electricity generation. The first models were very primitive: all components were simply fixed to a wall. Later they were mounted on wooden panels. For reasons of fire protection, the wood was replaced by slate or marble. This led to a further improvement, because the switching and measuring devices could be attached to the front, while the wiring was on the back.

== Housing ==
Switchgear for lower voltages may be entirely enclosed within a building. For higher voltages (over about 66 kV), switchgear is typically mounted outdoors and insulated by air, although this requires a large amount of space. Gas-insulated switchgear saves space compared with air-insulated equipment, although the equipment cost is higher. Oil-insulated switchgear presents an oil spill hazard.

Switches may be manually operated or have motor drives to allow for remote control.

== Circuit breaker types ==
A switchgear may be a simple open-air isolator switch or it may be insulated by some other substance. An effective although more costly form of switchgear is the gas-insulated switchgear (GIS), where the conductors and contacts are insulated by pressurized dielectric gas. Other common types are oil- and vacuum-insulated switchgear.

The combination of equipment within the switchgear enclosure allows them to interrupt fault currents of thousands of amps. A circuit breaker (within a switchgear enclosure) is the primary component that interrupts fault currents. The quenching of the arc when the circuit breaker pulls apart the contacts (disconnects the circuit) requires careful design. Circuit breakers fall into these six types:

=== Oil ===
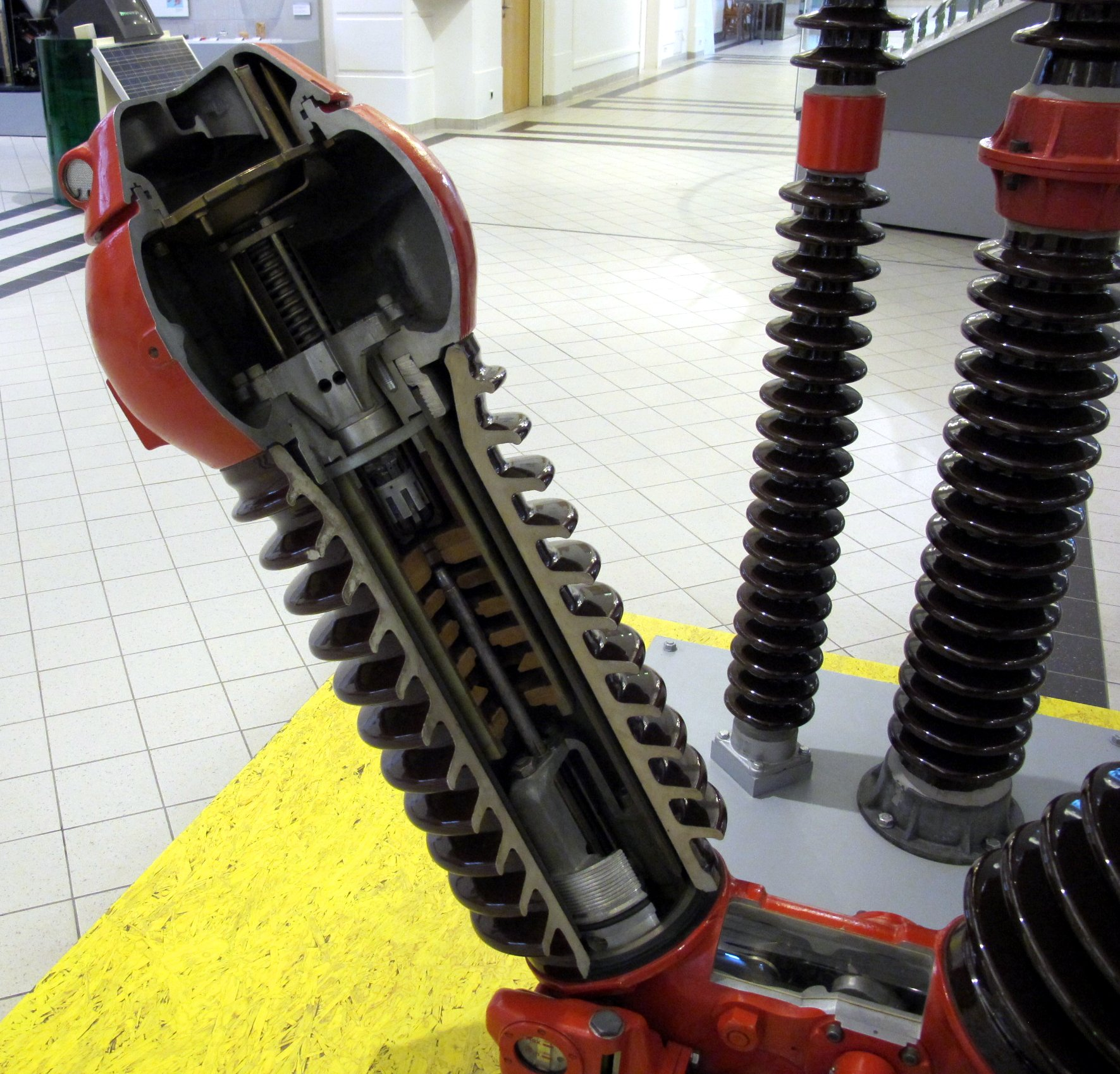
Cutaway model of an oil-filled high-voltage circuit breaker

Oil circuit breakers rely upon the vaporization of some of the oil to blast a jet of oil along the arc's path. The vapor released by the arcing consists of hydrogen gas. Mineral oil has better insulating properties than air. Whenever there is a separation of current-carrying contacts in the oil, the arc in the circuit breaker is initialized at the moment of separation of contacts, and due to this arc the oil is vaporized and decomposed to mostly hydrogen gas and ultimately creates a hydrogen bubble around the electric arc. This highly compressed gas bubble around the turn prevents the re-striking of the arc after the current reaches zero crossing of the cycle. The oil circuit breaker is one of the oldest types of circuit breakers.

=== Air ===
Air circuit breakers may use compressed air (puff) or the magnetic force of the arc itself to elongate the arc. As the length of the sustainable arc is dependent on the available voltage, the elongated arc will eventually exhaust itself. Alternatively, the contacts are rapidly swung into a small sealed chamber, the escaping of the displaced air thus blowing out the arc.

Circuit breakers are usually able to terminate all current flow very quickly: typically between 30 ms and 150 ms depending upon the age and construction of the device.

=== Gas ===
Gas circuit breakers sometimes stretch the arc using a magnetic field, and then rely upon the dielectric strength of gasses like SF_{6} to quench the stretched arc.

Breakers that use carbon dioxide as the insulating and arc extinguishing medium work on the same principles as a sulfur hexafluoride (SF_{6}) breaker. Because SF_{6} is a greenhouse gas more potent than CO_{2}, by switching from SF_{6} to CO_{2} it is possible to reduce the greenhouse gas emissions by 10 tons during the product lifecycle.

Due to the 2024 EU mandate to phase out SF_{6} gas use in GIS, there was a large industry wide move to find alternative dielectric gasses. Alternatives being explored include different mixtures of natural gasses from the atmosphere (Oxygen, Carbon Dioxide and Nitrogen) and new artificial dielectric gasses that are much less potent greenhouse gasses than SF_{6}. Alternative gasses to SF_{6} are usually worse dielectrics, requiring the GIS be larger and use more materials to manufacture for the same rating.

=== Hybrid ===
Hybrid switchgear is a type which combines the components of traditional air-insulated switchgear (AIS) and SF_{6} gas-insulated switchgear (GIS) technologies. It is characterized by a compact and modular design, which encompasses several different functions in one module.

=== Vacuum ===
Circuit breakers with vacuum interrupters have minimal arcing characteristics (as there is nothing to ionize other than the contact material), so the arc quenches when it is stretched by a small amount (<2–8 mm). Near zero current the arc is not hot enough to maintain a plasma, and current ceases; the gap can then withstand the rise of voltage. Vacuum circuit breakers are frequently used in modern medium-voltage switchgear to 40,500 volts. Unlike the other types, they are inherently unsuitable for interrupting DC faults. The reason vacuum circuit breakers are unsuitable for breaking high DC voltages is that with DC there is no "current zero" period. The plasma arc can feed itself by continuing to gasify the contact material.

== Protective circuitry ==
=== Circuit breakers and fuses ===
Circuit breakers and fuses disconnect when current exceeds a predetermined safe level. However they cannot sense other critical faults, such as unbalanced currents—for example, when a transformer winding contacts ground. By themselves, circuit breakers and fuses cannot distinguish between short circuits and high levels of electrical demand.

=== Merz–Price circulating current scheme ===
Differential protection depends upon Kirchhoff's current law, which states that the sum of currents entering or leaving a circuit node must equal zero. Using this principle to implement differential protection, any section of a conductive path may be considered a node. The conductive path could be a transmission line, a winding of a transformer, a winding in a motor, or a winding in the stator of an alternator. This form of protection works best when both ends of the conductive path are physically close to each other. This scheme was invented in Great Britain by Charles Hesterman Merz and Bernard Price.

Two identical current transformers are used for each winding of a transformer, stator, or other device. The current transformers are placed around opposite ends of a winding. The current through both ends should be identical. A protective relay detects any imbalance in currents, and trips circuit breakers to isolate the device. In the case of a transformer, the circuit breakers on both the primary and secondary would open.

=== Distance relays ===
A short circuit at the end of a long transmission line appears similar to a normal load, because the impedance of the transmission line limits the fault current. A distance relay detects a fault by comparing the voltage and current on the transmission line. A large current along with a voltage drop indicates a fault.

== Classification ==
Several different classifications of switchgear can be made:

- By the current rating.
- By interrupting rating (maximum short circuit current kAIC that the device can safely interrupt)
  - Circuit breakers can open and close on fault currents
  - Load-break/Load-make switches can switch normal system load currents
  - Isolators are off load disconnectors which are to be operated after Circuit Breakers, or else if the load current is very small
- By voltage class:
  - Low voltage (less than 1 kV AC)
  - Medium voltage (1 kV AC through to approximately 75 kV AC)
  - High voltage (75 kV to about 230 kV AC)
  - Extra high voltage, ultra high voltage (more than 230 kV)
- By insulating medium:
  - Air
  - Gas (SF_{6} or mixtures)
  - Oil
  - Vacuum
  - Carbon dioxide (CO_{2})
- By construction type:
  - Indoor (further classified by IP (Ingress Protection) class or NEMA enclosure type)
  - Outdoor
  - Industrial
  - Utility
  - Marine
  - Draw-out elements (removable without many tools)
  - Fixed elements (bolted fasteners)
  - Live-front
  - Dead-front
  - Open
  - Metal-enclosed (ME) — A switchgear assembly completely enclosed on all sides and the top with sheet metal.
  - Metal-clad (MC) — A more expensive variety of metal-enclosed switchgear that has the following characteristics: the main switching and interrupting device of removable type; grounded metal barriers to separate compartments and enclose all major circuits and parts; mechanical interlocks; insulated bus conductors and other features.
  - Cubicle
  - Arc-resistant
- By IEC degree of internal separation
  - No Separation (Form 1)
  - Busbars separated from functional units (Form 2a, 2b, 3a, 3b, 4a, 4b)
  - Terminals for external conductors separated from busbars (Form 2b, 3b, 4a, 4b)
  - Terminals for external conductors separated from functional units but not from each other (Form 3a, 3b)
  - Functional units separated from each other (Form 3a, 3b, 4a, 4b)
  - Terminals for external conductors separated from each other (Form 4a, 4b)
  - Terminals for external conductors separate from their associated functional unit (Form 4b)
- By interrupting device:
  - Fuses
  - Air Circuit Breaker
  - Minimum Oil Circuit Breaker
  - Oil Circuit Breaker
  - Vacuum Circuit Breaker
  - Gas (SF_{6}) Circuit breaker
  - CO_{2} Circuit Breaker
- By operating method:
  - Manually operated
  - Motor/stored energy operated
  - Solenoid operated
- By type of current:
  - Alternating current
  - Direct current
- By application:
  - Transmission system
  - Distribution
- By purpose
  - Isolating switches (disconnectors)
  - Load-break switches.
  - Grounding (earthing) switches

A single line-up may incorporate several different types of devices, for example, air-insulated bus, vacuum circuit breakers, and manually operated switches may all exist in the same row of cubicles.

Ratings, design, specifications and details of switchgear are set by a multitude of standards. In North America mostly IEEE and ANSI standards are used, much of the rest of the world uses IEC standards, sometimes with local national derivatives or variations.

== Safety ==
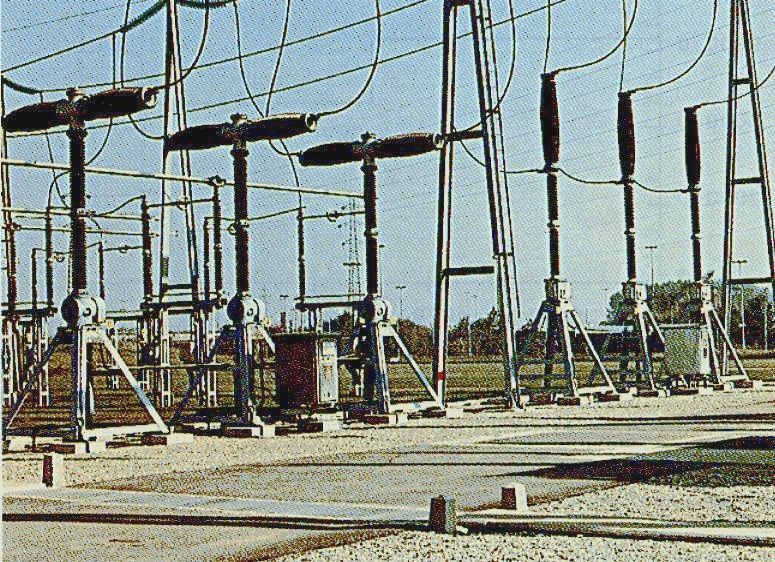
245 kV circuit breaker in air-insulated substation

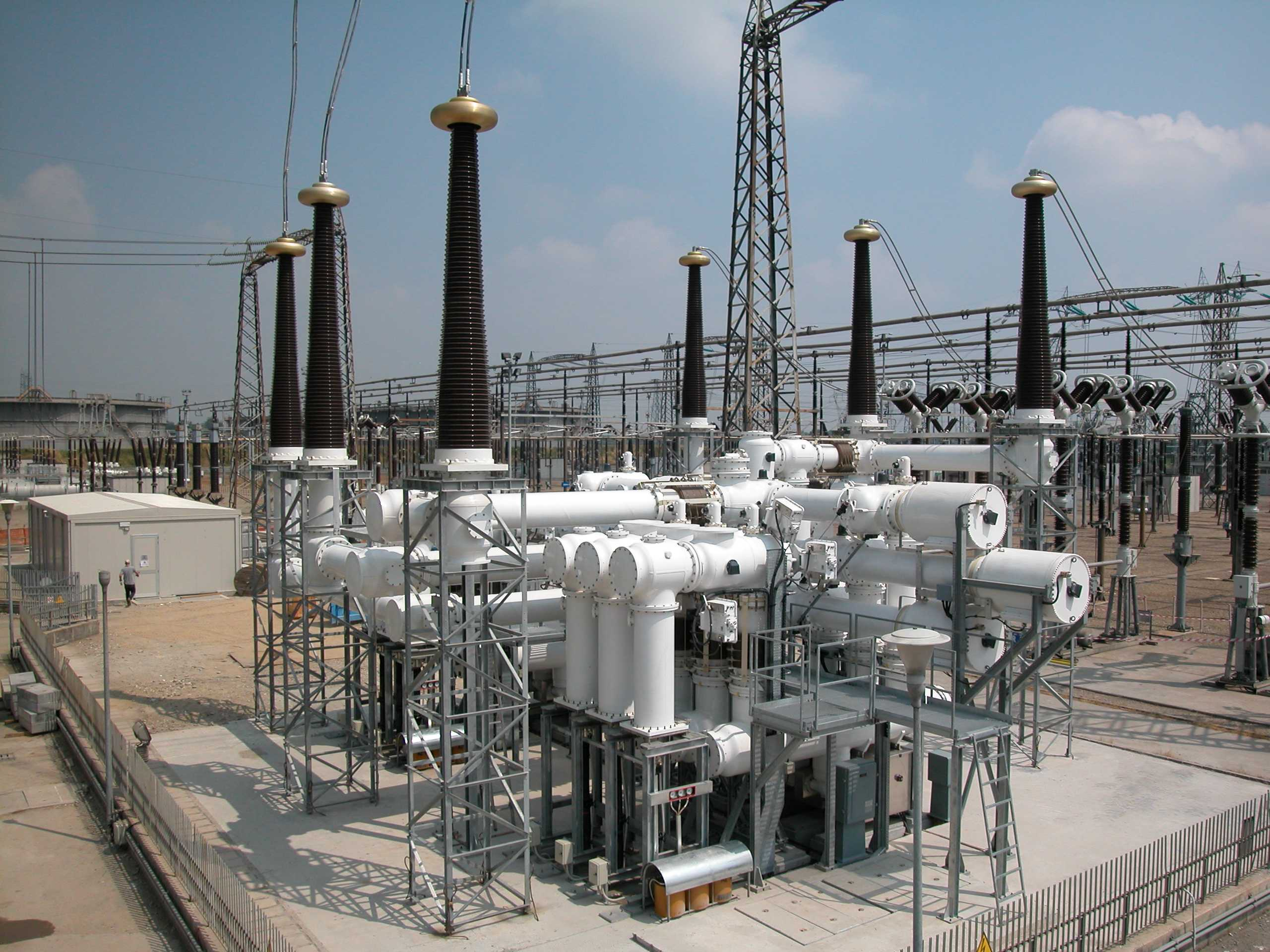
420 kV gas-insulated switchgear

To help ensure safe operation sequences of switchgear, trapped-key interlocking provides predefined scenarios of operation. For example, if only one of two sources of supply are permitted to be connected at a given time, the interlock scheme may require that the first switch must be opened to release a key that will allow closing the second switch. Complex schemes are possible.

Indoor switchgear can also be type tested for internal arc containment (e.g., IEC 62271-200). This test is important for user safety as modern switchgear is capable of switching large currents.

Switchgear is often inspected using thermal imaging to assess the state of the system and predict failures before they occur. Other methods include partial discharge (PD) testing, using either fixed or portable testers, and acoustic emission testing using surface-mounted transducers (for oil equipment) or ultrasonic detectors used in outdoor switchyards. Temperature sensors fitted to cables to the switchgear can permanently monitor temperature build-up. SF_{6} equipment is invariably fitted with alarms and interlocks to warn of loss of pressure, and to prevent operation if the pressure falls too low.

The increasing awareness of dangers associated with high fault levels has resulted in network operators specifying closed-door operations for earth switches and racking breakers. Many European power companies have banned operators from switch rooms while operating. Remote racking systems are available which allow an operator to rack switchgear from a remote location without the need to wear a protective arc flash hazard suit. Switchgear systems require continuous maintenance and servicing to remain safe to use and fully optimized to provide such high voltages.

== See also ==
- Arc flash
- Circuit breaker
- Disconnector
- Electrical safety
- Electric arc
- High voltage
- Remote racking system
- Short circuit
