= NFPA 70E =

Fire and electrical protection standard on employees

NFPA 70E (Standard for Electrical Safety in the Workplace) is a standard of the National Fire Protection Association (NFPA). The document covers electrical safety requirements for employees. The NFPA is best known for publishing the National Electrical Code (NFPA 70).

== Purpose ==
NFPA 70E addresses employee workplace electrical safety requirements. The standard focuses on practical safeguards that also allow workers to be productive within their job functions. Specifically, the standard covers the safety requirements for the following:

1. Electrical conductors and equipment installed within or on buildings or other structures, including mobile homes, recreational vehicles, and other premises (yards, carnivals, parking lots, and industrial substations)
2. Conductors that connect installations to a supply of electricity

Not covered are - electrical installations in marine, aircraft, auto vehicles, communications and electrical utilities.

Key principles covered are JSA/JHA/AHA procedures to ascertain shock protection boundaries, arc flash incident energy expressed in calories/cm2, lockout-tagout, and personal protective equipment. While the various OSHA, ASTM, IEEE and NEC standard provide guidelines for performance, NFPA 70E addresses practices and is widely considered as the de facto standard for Electrical Safety in the Workplace.

Practices include:

- Staging a "safe work zone" with boundaries, barricades, signs and attendants.
- Proper body positioning to reduce ergonomic risk, use of rescue hooks in Medium Voltage switching.
- Human factor analysis, written procedures to reduce incidents not otherwise imminent from above.

== See also ==
- Electrical engineering
- High-voltage hazards
- Arc Flash

=== Other NFPA standards ===
- NFPA 70 — National Electrical Code (NEC)
- NFPA 70B — Recommended Practice for Electrical Equipment Maintenance
- NFPA 72 — National Fire Alarm Code
- NFPA 704 — Standard System for the Identification of the Hazards of Materials for Emergency Response
- NFPA 853 — Standard for the installation of stationary fuel cell power systems
- NFPA 921 — Guide for Fire and Explosion Investigations
- NFPA 101 — Life Safety Code
- NFPA 1123 — Code for Outdoor Firework Displays
- NFPA 1901 — Standard for Automotive Fire Apparatus
