= High-voltage switchgear =

Switchgear used in power systems above 1000 volts

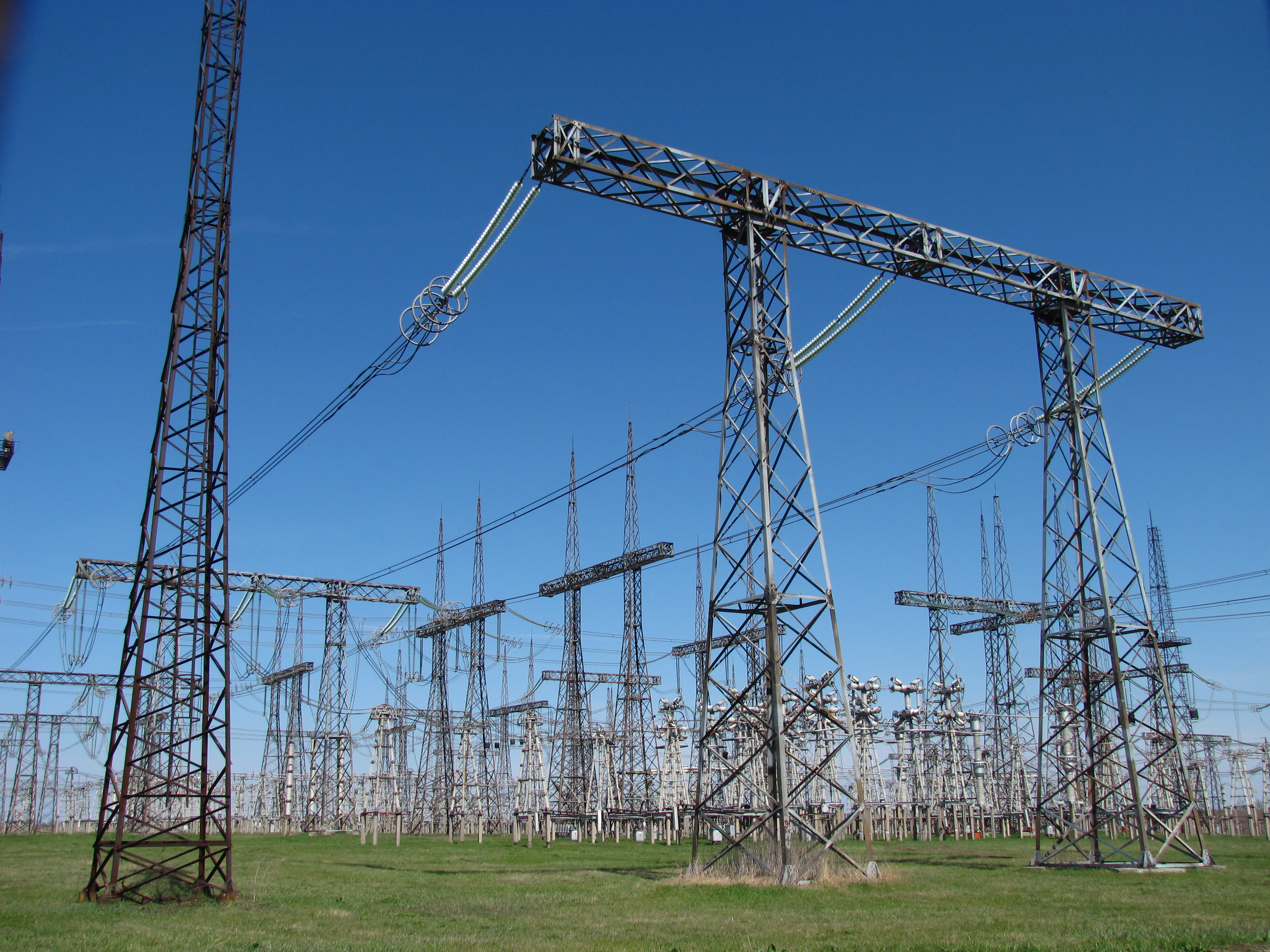
750 kV high-voltage switchgear

High-voltage switchgear is any switchgear used to connect or disconnect a part of a high-voltage power system. This equipment is essential for the protection and safe operation, without interruption, of a high voltage power system, and is important because it is directly linked to the quality of the electricity supply.

The term "high voltage" covers the former medium voltage (MV) and the former high voltage (HV), so refers to equipment with a rated voltage of over 1000 V in the case of alternating current, and over 1500 V in the case of direct current. The industrial applications of high voltage circuit breakers are for the moment limited to alternating current because they are more economical, there are however high voltage disconnectors for direct current connections.

High-voltage switchgear was invented at the end of the 19th century for operating motors and other electric machines. The technology has been improved over time and can be used with voltages up to 1,100 kV.

== Classification ==
=== Functional classification ===
==== Disconnectors and earthing switches ====
Disconnectors and earthing switches are safety devices used to open or to close a circuit when there is no current through them. They are used to isolate a part of a circuit, a machine, a part of an overhead line or an underground cable so that maintenance can be safely conducted.

The opening of the line isolator or busbar section isolator is necessary for safety, but not sufficient. Grounding must be conducted at both the upstream and downstream sections of the device under maintenance. This is accomplished by earthing switches.

In principle, disconnecting switches do not have to interrupt currents, as they are designed for use on de-energized circuits. In practice, some are capable of interrupting currents (as much as 1,600 ampere under 300 V but only if current is drawn via a same circuit half breaker bypass system), and some earthing switches must interrupt induced currents which are generated in a non-current-carrying line by inductive and capacitive coupling with nearby lines (up to 160 A under 20 kV).

==== High-current switching mechanism ====
High-current switching mechanisms are used for energized circuits carrying a normal load. Some can be used as a disconnecting switch. But if they can create a short-circuit current, they cannot interrupt it.

==== Contactor ====
Contactors are similar in function to high-current switching mechanisms, but can be used at higher rates. They have a high electrical endurance and a high mechanical endurance.

==== Fuses ====
A fuse can automatically interrupt a circuit with an overcurrent flowing in it for a fixed time. This is accomplished by the fusion of an electrical conductor which is graded.

Fuses are mainly used to protect against short circuits. They limit the peak value of the fault current.

In three-phase electric power, they only eliminate the phases where the fault current is flowing, which can pose a risk for both the malfunctioning devices and the people. To alleviate this problem, fuses can be used in conjunction with high-current switches or contactors.

Like contactors, high-voltage fuses are used only in the band 30 kV to 100 kV.

==== Circuit breaker ====
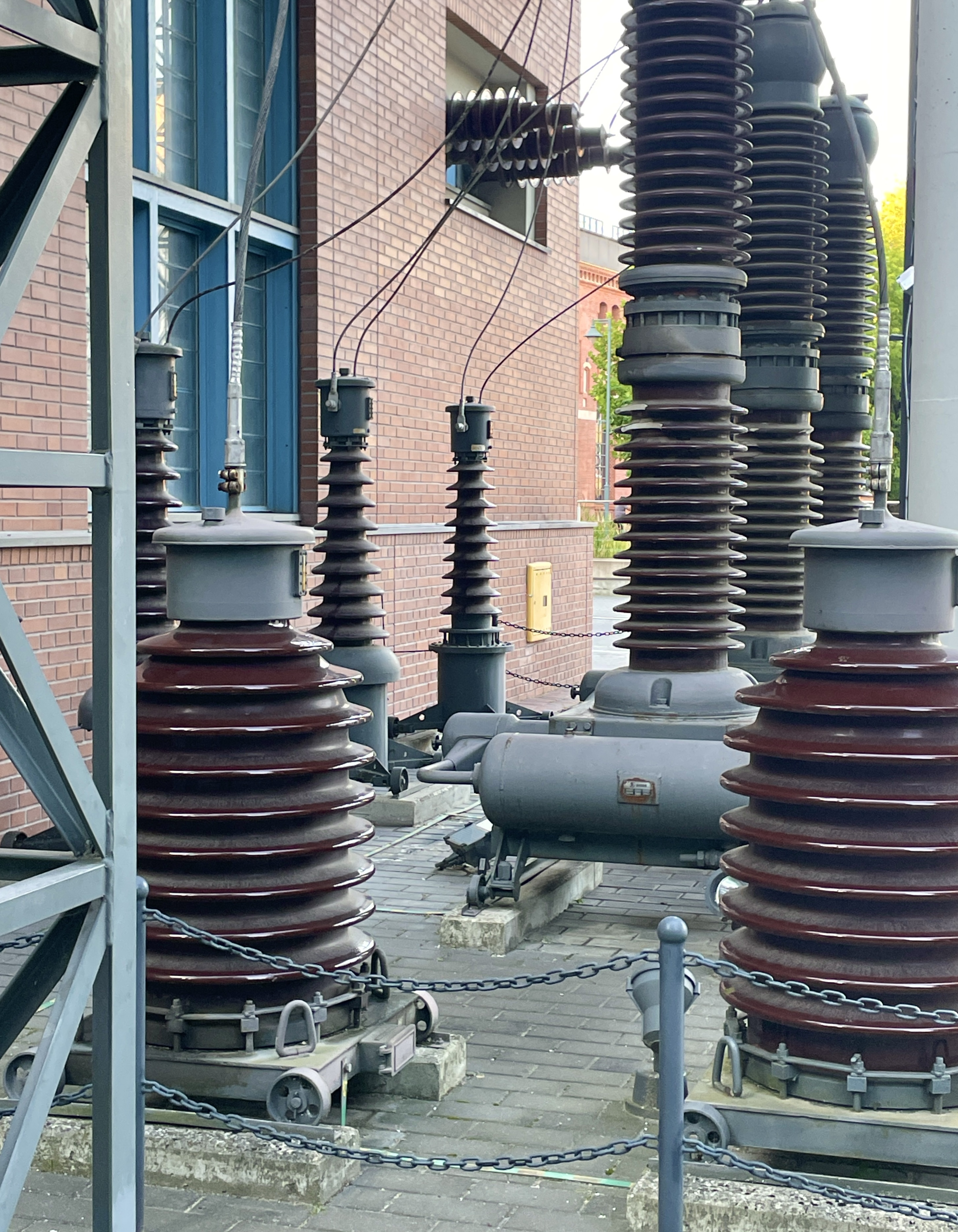
110 kV circuit breakers, former EC1 power plant, EC1 Science and Technology Centre

A high voltage circuit breaker is capable of connecting, carrying and disconnecting currents under the rated voltage (the maximal voltage of the power system which it is protecting).

Under normal operational conditions, circuit breakers can be used to (dis)connect a line. Circuit breakers can also be used to interrupt current when anomalies are detected, such as a short-circuit.

Circuit breakers are essential elements of high-voltage power systems because they are the only means to safely interrupt a short circuit current. The international standard IEC 62271-100 defines the demands linked to the characteristics of a high voltage circuit breaker.

The circuit breaker can be equipped with electronic devices to know at any moment their states, such as wear or gas pressure, and to detect faults from characteristic derivatives. It can also permit planned maintenance operations and to avoid failures.

To operate on long lines, circuit breakers are equipped with a closing resistor to limit overvoltages.

They can be equipped with devices to synchronize closing and/or opening, to limit the overvoltages and the inrush currents from the lines, the unloaded transformers, the shunt reactances and the capacitor banks.

Some devices are designed to have the characteristics of the circuit breaker and the disconnector, but their use is not widespread.
