= Astoria Borealis =

2018 electrical accident

The Astoria Borealis was an industrial accident that occurred at a Con Edison substation in Astoria, Queens, New York City, on December 27, 2018. During the incident, a 138,000 volt coupling capacitor potential device failed, resulting in an arc flash, which in turn burned aluminum, lighting up the sky with a blue-green spectacle visible for miles around and as far as New Jersey. It received the humorous name "Astoria Borealis" due to its resemblance to the northern lights. The event was covered extensively on social media, and LaGuardia Airport temporarily lost power, but there were neither deaths nor injuries. Such was the magnitude of the bizarre illumination that extraterrestrial visitation or a noisy helicopter were the supposition.

== Incident ==
On the night of December 27, 2018, an electrical fault in voltage-monitoring equipment triggered a fire in the Astoria East substation on 20th Avenue and 32nd Street in Queens. While only part of a single section within the substation, it caused an intense blue light that could be seen for miles and lit up the night sky bright enough to resemble daytime—clearly visible across other boroughs and as far as New Jersey. The blue color was caused by refraction off the cloud cover, despite the white color of the explosion itself. LaGuardia Airport, which suffered an outage due to the accident, was forced to temporarily close. Power was also knocked out at Rikers Island, and some subway lines were disrupted. It was dubbed "Astoria Borealis" by residents and the news media.

While the substation was equipped with systems that should have stopped the accident immediately, it took four minutes to cut the flow of electricity. Due to the "apocalyptic" appearance of the aerial lights, some believed they were caused by an alien invasion or nuclear war.

== Aftermath ==
On January 8, New York City Councilmember Costa Constantinides used the incident as an example of why New York should no longer rely on fossil fuels when touting a new bill studying the closure of the city's gas-fired power plants. On February 11, 2019, the City Council held a hearing on the causes of the accident. Constantinides remarked that there were both air quality and safety concerns and that he wanted "hard answers."
