= Guillotine test =

In safety engineering, a Guillotine Test simulates an arc fault condition between parallel conductors or a cut wire, replicating the conditions that result from arc faults and which can lead to fires in adjacent material and wires, for example during accidents. Based upon a dry arc test method used for testing wire insulation material, this test was originally developed for arc-fault circuit interrupters.

Testing of this type plays an important role in helping researchers who are looking into wiring faults in aircraft, submarine communication cables, etc. This can lead to products that are able to quickly identify and locate these wiring faults for easier and less costly repairs and an overall safer environment.
