= Kraus & Naimer =

Kraus & Naimer Group
- Company type: GmbH
- Industry: Electrical components, machine industry, toolmaking
- Predecessor: Hubert Laurenz Naimer (1922–2004)
- Founder: Franz Kraus (1877–1962) and Lorenz Naimer (1868–1944)
- Headquarters: Vienna, Austria
- Products: Rotary cam switch, control and load switch
- Owner: Joachim (Ted) Laurenz Naimer leads the company in the third generation (since 2004)
- Number of employees: 900 (2017)
- Website: https://www.krausnaimer.com

Kraus & Naimer is an electrical switchgear manufacturer specializing in load and disconnect switches. Kraus & Naimer is world market leader in modular cam switches. and a supplier of switchgear for industrial customers in the fields of transport (railways, vehicles, ships, etc.), conveyor systems, lift systems, mechanical engineering and power generation and power distribution systems.

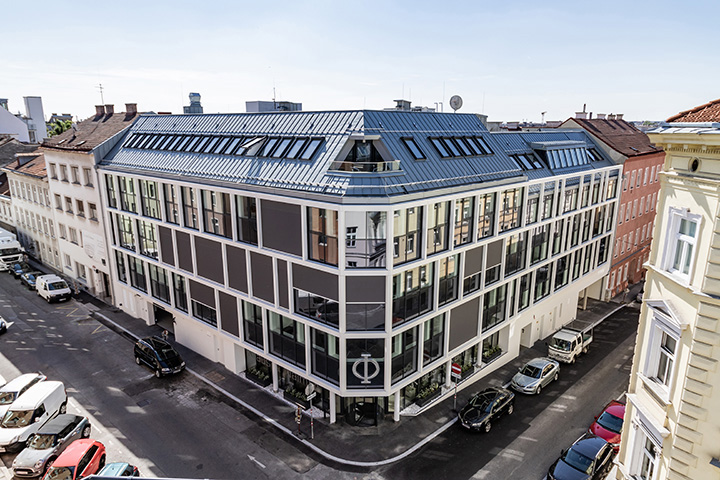
Kraus & Naimer Headquarters in Vienna

The headquarters of the Austrian family business Kraus & Naimer is located in Vienna, Austria. The company currently operates six factories in Europe (Germany, Austria, Hungary), North and South America (USA, Brazil), Oceania (New Zealand) and 19 sales subsidiaries worldwide – 11 in Europe (Austria, Germany, France, Spain, Belgium, Italy, Finland, Sweden, UK, Norway, Netherlands), two in North America (USA, Canada), two in Oceania (Australia, New Zealand), one in South America (Brazil), one in Africa (South Africa) and two in Asia (Japan, Singapore). Globally Kraus & Naimer has more than 900 employees and generates annual revenue of 163 million.

== History ==
The company was founded in Vienna in 1907 in Wattgasse 53 within the 16th district Ottakring. The company's history began in the era of electricity. Lorenz Naimer, founder and financier of the company as well as his partner Franz Kraus, who was responsible for the technical development and implementation, carried out research in the field of electrical special machines. On 28 September 1909, the company was officially renamed Kraus & Naimer. In 1912, the company relocated to Schumanngasse 35 in the 18th district Währing, which was extended in the years 1947–1961. Between 1968 and 1970 an additional production facility was built close to Vienna in Weikersdorf, Lower Austria. In 1989/1990 a state-of-the-art assembly facility was added; in 2013 the facility was roughly doubled in size.

In 1947, Hubert Laurenz Naimer took over the management of the company from his father Lorenz Naimer, which he developed into a global corporation through innovations and global business drive until his death in 2004. In 1981, his son Joachim Laurenz Naimer joined the management of the company and he has been running the company since 2004.

== Products ==
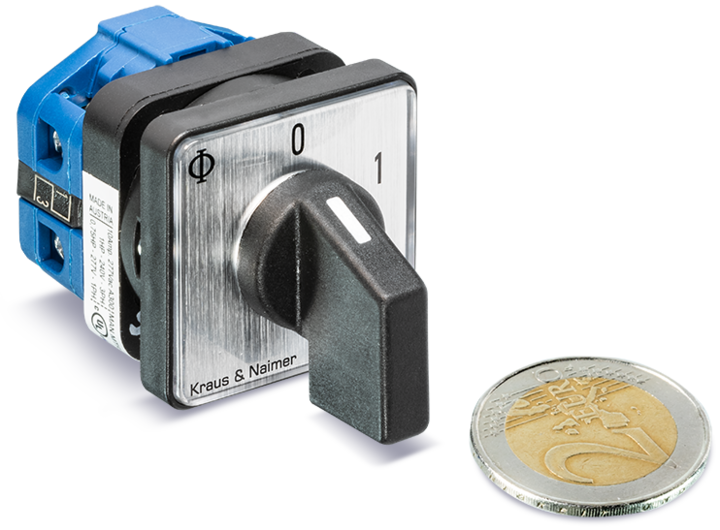
CA4N, the smallest cam switch in the world

The foundation stone of the company was laid in Vienna in 1907 in the Wattgasse 53 in the 16th district Ottakring. The company initially produced knife switches, the forerunners of today's disconnectors, which are counted from construction to the simplest and the first electrical switches towards the end of the 19th century. The other main products in the first four decades of the company's existence were lever and roller switches. At the end of the 1920s the new plastic material bakelite was used in switch construction. Kraus & Naimer is the patent owner of numerous innovations in switchgear technology. For the first time in 1948, the company launched onto the market a cam switch in the modular design (model C15), whereby customer-specific switches can be manufactured. The method of mass production of individual products is generally known in the industry also under the term mass customization.

Another milestone in the company's history was the development of the world smallest cam switch (model CA4N), which has been available since 1994.

At the beginning of the 50s, Kraus & Naimer was one of the first industrial companies that used thermoplastics, especially polyamides, in the switchgear technology. The entire value-added chain from research and development to sales is handled by the company itself with specially founded logistics and dispatch centers as well as worldwide dispatch cooperation partners. As one of the world's leading manufacturers of rotary cam switches which uses a small amount of gold and copper, Kraus & Naimer took necessary steps to avoid the use of materials from illegal and unethical sources in their products and purchase raw materials from companies that are listed on the CFSI Conflict Free Sourcing Initiative CFSI.
