= CAN/ULC S801 =

Organization

CAN/ULC S801: Standard on Electric Utility Workplace Electrical Safety for Generation, Transmission and Distribution.

This National Standard of Canada applies to the construction, operation, maintenance and replacement of electric utility systems that are used to generate, transform, transmit, distribute and deliver electrical power or energy to consumer services or their equivalent.

== Purpose ==
Live Working (high voltage) may present potential safety risks to workers and the general public. CAN/ULC-S801 gives electric utilities a foundation for safe working environments for their employees across Canada. CAN/ULC-S801 provides a complete safety guide addressing numerous electric utility workplace safety concerns, such as:

- Fundamental requirements
- Minimum approach distances for working near or on energized electrical lines or equipment
- Protective tools, equipment & devices
- Working on energized electrical lines and equipment
- Arc flash protection
- Radio frequency hazards
- Working on isolated electric utility systems
- Working near electric utility systems

== See also ==
- Electric Utility
- High-voltage hazards
- Arc Flash
- Lockout-Tagout
- Canadian Electrical Code
- Protective clothing
