= Remote racking system =

A remote racking system or remote racking device is a system that allows an operator racking in and out a withdrawable circuit breaker from a remote location. It offers a safe alternative to manually racking circuit breakers, which reduces the requirement for service personnel to wear a full-body arc flash hazard suit for protection.

== Advantages ==
A circuit breaker is an automatically operated electrical switch designed to protect an electrical circuit from damage caused by overload or short circuit. There are fixed and withdrawable circuit breakers.

An arc flash is a type of electrical explosion that results from a low impedance connection to ground or another voltage phase in an electrical system. By permitting the automatic racking of the circuit breaker from a remote location, the remote racking systems move service personnel outside the arc flash protection boundary, thus reducing the need for a full-body arc flash hazard suit.

A remote switch operator is used to remotely operate various types and styles of circuit breakers and controls. When the remote racking system is used in conjunction with a remote switch operator, the user can also operate, trip, and release the circuit breaker from a safe distance.

== Designs ==
There are several designs of remote racking systems on the market and most include either a wired or wireless remote control. The distance at which these can be used varies by which product is chosen. Also, the style and size will also be a factor in choosing a remote racking system as some are larger than others. Many systems either implement a "roll-up" design, similar to that of a small hand truck or dolly, while some are integral to the switchgear that the breaker is mounted in.

== See also ==
- Circuit breaker
- Arc flash
- Switchgear
