= IEEE 1584 =

IEEE standard for calculating the incident energy of arc flash event

IEEE Std 1584-2018 (Guide for Performing Arc-Flash Hazard Calculations) is a standard of the Institute of Electrical and Electronics Engineers that provides a method of calculating the incident energy of arc flash event.

== Purpose ==
IEEE 1584-2018 is an update to IEEE 1584-2002 and was developed to help protect people from arc-flash hazard dangers. The predicted arc current and incident energy are used in selecting appropriate overcurrent protective devices and personal protective equipment (generally abbreviated as PPE), as well as defining safe working distance. Since the magnitude of the arc current is inherently linked with the degree of arc hazard, the arc is examined as a circuit parameter. Furthermore, since estimations are often useful, simple equations for predicting ballpark arc current, arc power, and incident energy values and probable ranges are presented in this work.

== Procedure ==
Arc Flash Hazard calculations are currently implemented in most of the industry plants due to OSHA regulations. The IEEE 1584 empirically derived model accurately accounts for a wide variety of setup parameters including:

- Voltages in the range of 208–15,000 V, three-phase.
- Frequencies of 50 Hz to 60 Hz.
- Bolted fault current in the range of 700–106,000 A.
- Grounded or ungrounded.
- Equipment enclosures of commonly available sizes with various conductor configurations, or open air.
- Gaps between conductors.
- Faults involving three phases.

For cases where voltage is over 15 kV or gap is outside the range of the model, the theoretically derived Lee method can be applied.

IEEE 1584.1 is a guide published in July 2022 for the specification of requirements for an Arc Flash Hazard Calculation study in accordance with the IEEE 1584 Standard.
