= Benshaw =

Electric motor company

Benshaw is a company that specializes in solid state reduced voltage electric motor controls, motor protection and variable frequency drives. Benshaw manufactures and engineers motor controls from 208 V through 15 kV, with horsepower ranges from fractional to 60,000 hp (45,000 kW).

== History ==
Benshaw was incorporated in 1974 as a small sideline for four men: Bob Schaltenbrand, Rich Benko, Pramodh Nijawan and Louis Posa. The name "Benshaw" came from Benko and Schaltenbrand. The men planned to work part-time until the company was able to financially support each of them. During its early years, most of the company's efforts were in panel manufacturing and sub-assembly. After a time, the men parted ways following different career paths. Benshaw Inc. was left to Bob Schaltenbrand alone.

Bob Schaltenbrand worked for a number of companies, but was unfulfilled and had ideas of his own. In 1979 Bob and Sandy Schaltenbrand were approached by Saftronics Ltd. in Canada to start Saftronics Inc. in the United States. The Schaltenbrands would own 40% of the company and operate the motor control manufacturing company in the United States. Within a year, the operation was moved out of their home and a couple of employees were hired. Operational and technical problems arose which ended the Schaltenbrand-Saftronics business relationship.

In 1983 Bob Schaltenbrand revitalized Benshaw, Inc. as a manufacturer of solid state motor controls. After developing a strong business relationship with Ron Vines in Canada, Benshaw Canada Controls, Inc. began in May 1988.

Benshaw's main headquarters are located in Pittsburgh (PA). Benshaw Canada is located in Listowel, Ontario.

In 2008 Benshaw was acquired by Curtiss-Wright Corporation and operated successfully as a business unit under Curtiss-Wright Flow Control.

In 2014 Benshaw was acquired by Regal Beloit Corporation and operated as a brand of Regal Beloit

In 2019 Benshaw was acquired by Sun Capital Partners, a leading private investment firm. Benshaw, Inc. is located at 615 Alpha Drive, Pittsburgh, PA. 15238

On 17 December 2019 Benshaw Inc. acquired AuCom Electronics Ltd. In North and South America Benshaw company will only operate as Benshaw moving forward, while in the international markets Benshaw and AuCom will continue to operate under their own brand.
