= NFPA 70B =

NFPA 70B (Standard for Electrical Equipment Maintenance) is a standard of the National Fire Protection Association that addresses preventive maintenance for electrical, electronic, and communication systems and equipment—such as those used in industrial plants, institutional and commercial buildings, and large multi-family residential complexes—to prevent equipment failures and worker injuries. NFPA 70B is component of the electrical cycle of safety which includes NFPA 70 and NFPA 70E.

== Purpose ==
This recommended practice applies to preventive maintenance for electrical, electronic, and communication systems and equipment and is not intended to duplicate or supersede instructions that manufacturers normally provide. Systems and equipment covered are typical of those installed in industrial plants, institutional and commercial buildings, and large multifamily residential complexes.

== History ==
On January 1, 2023, NFPA 70B transitioned from the Recommended Practice for Electrical Equipment Maintenance to the Standard for Electrical Equipment Maintenance.

== Related NFPA standards ==
- NFPA 70 — National Electrical Code (NEC)
- NFPA 70E — Standard for Electrical Safety in the Workplace
