= NFPA 1123 =

Standard for firework safety

NFPA 1123, subtitled Code for Fireworks Display, is a code created in the United States by the National Fire Protection Association (NFPA) to help prevent damage of property and injury or death of individuals during outdoor firework displays. NFPA 1123 is the registered trademark of an American consensus standard which, like many NFPA documents, is systematically revised on a fixed three year cycle.

The standard, though widely adopted in the United States, is not a legal code. It is, however, deliberately crafted with language suitable for mandatory application to facilitate adoption into law by those empowered to do so.

== Document scope ==
The scope of the document is described as below on the NFPA website:

"Document Scope: 1.1.1 This code shall apply to the construction, handling, and use of fireworks and equipment intended for outdoor fireworks display. It also shall apply to the general conduct and operation of the display. (See definition 1.4.21, Fireworks Display.) 1.1.2 This code shall not apply to the manufacture, transportation, or storage of fireworks at a manufacturing facility. Similarly, this code shall not apply to the testing of fireworks under the direction of its manufacturer, provided permission for such testing has been obtained from the authority having jurisdiction, which shall be in accordance with NFPA 1124, Code for the Manufacture, Transportation, and Storage of Fireworks and Pyrotechnic Articles. 1.1.3 This code shall not apply to the use of consumer fireworks by the general public. 1.1.4 This code shall not apply to the transportation, handling, or use of fireworks by the armed forces of the United States. 1.1.5 This code shall not apply to the transportation, handling, or use of industrial pyrotechnic devices or fireworks, such as railroad torpedoes, fusees, automotive, aeronautical, and marine flares, and smoke signals. 1.1.6 This code shall not apply to the use of pyrotechnic devices or materials in the performing arts at distances less than those specified in this code and used in conformance with NFPA 1126, Standard for the Use of Pyrotechnics before a Proximate Audience. 1.1.7 This code shall not apply to the use of flame special effects in the performing arts when used in conformance with NFPA 160, Standard for Flame Effects before an Audience. 1.1.8 This code shall not apply to the sale and use of model rockets, model rocket motors, motor reloading kits, pyrotechnic modules, or components used in conformance with NFPA 1122, Code for Model Rocketry, or other propulsion devices as classified by the U.S. Department of Transportation as Rocket Motors (UN0186), or Cartridges, power device (UN0275). 1.1.9 This code shall not apply to the use of explosives, firearms, or flammable special effects used in motion pictures, television, or other entertainment industries."

== Sections ==
This listing of sections from the 2006 edition shows the scope of the code.

- General Information
- Referenced Publications
- Definitions
- Requirements for Display Fireworks Aerial Shells & Equipment
- Display Site Selection
- Floating Vessels and Floating Platforms
- Rooftops, Other Structures, and Other Limited Egress Locations
- Operation of the Display
- Qualifications

== Editions ==
NFPA 1123 has six editions: 1995, 2000, 2006, 2010, 2014 and 2018.

== Areas using NFPA 1123 ==
- Alachua County, Florida
- Manatee County, Florida
- Palm Coast, Florida
- Salt Lake City, Utah

== See also ==
- National Fire Protection Association
- Fire code
- Fireworks
- Explosives shipping classification system
- HAZMAT Class 1 Explosives
