= Karen Naimer =

Karen Naimer is a Canadian lawyer and director of programs for Physicians for Human Rights (PHR), a US-based NGO.

== Education ==
Naimer is a lawyer by profession and a BA graduate from McGill University; holds an MA from the University of Toronto; a JD from the University of Toronto Faculty of Law; and an LLM from New York University School of Law. Naimer is a fellow of Truman National Security and proficient in French.

== Career ==
Naimer was an associate in New York at Paul, Weiss, Rifkind, Wharton & Garrison LLP, and has worked for the New York Asian Women's Center and the Barbra Schlifer Commemorative Clinic, Toronto, Canada. Naimer was also a Deputy Counselor at the Independent Inquiry Committee into the United Nations Oil-For-Food Programme (the Paul Volcker Committee) and worked at the International Criminal Tribunal for the former Yugoslavia. She has experience in international humanitarian law, international criminal law, and Human Rights Law.

Previously, Naimer taught international law as an associate professor at New York University Center for Global Affairs and consulted Brande Institute for International Judges. She was the Harvard University Center for Ethics Edmond J. Safra Faculty Fellow in 2007–2008.

== Recognitions ==
Naimer's work has been cited and featured in The BBC, The Wall Street Journal, The New York Times, The Guardian, PBS NewsHour, Foreign Policy, The British Medical Journal, The Lancet, and others.
