= Arc fault =

High power discharge of electricity

An arc fault is a high power discharge of electricity between two or more conductors. This discharge generates heat, which can break down the wire's insulation and trigger an electrical fire. Arc faults can range in current from a few amps up to thousands of amps, and are highly variable in strength and duration.

Some common causes of arc fault are loose wire connections, over heated wires, or wires pinched by furniture.

== Location and detection ==
Two types of wiring protection are standard thermal breakers and arc fault circuit breakers. Thermal breakers require an overload condition long enough that a heating element in the breaker trips the breaker off. In contrast, arc fault circuit breakers use magnetic or other means to detect increases in current draw much more quickly. Without such protection, visually detecting arc faults in defective wiring is very difficult, as the arc fault occurs in a very small area. A problem with arc fault circuit breaker is they are more likely to produce false positives due to normal circuit behaviors appearing to be arc faults. For instance, lightning strikes on the outside of an aircraft mimic arc faults in their voltage and current profiles. Research has been able to largely eliminate such false positives, however, providing the ability to quickly identify and locate repairs that need to be done.

In simple wiring systems visual inspection can lead to finding the fault location, but in complex wiring systems, for instance aircraft wiring, devices such as a time-domain reflectometer are helpful, even on live wires.

== See also ==
- Arc flash
- Arc-fault circuit interrupter
- Time-domain reflectometer
