= Trapped-key interlocking =

Safety locking mechanism used in operating industrial machinery

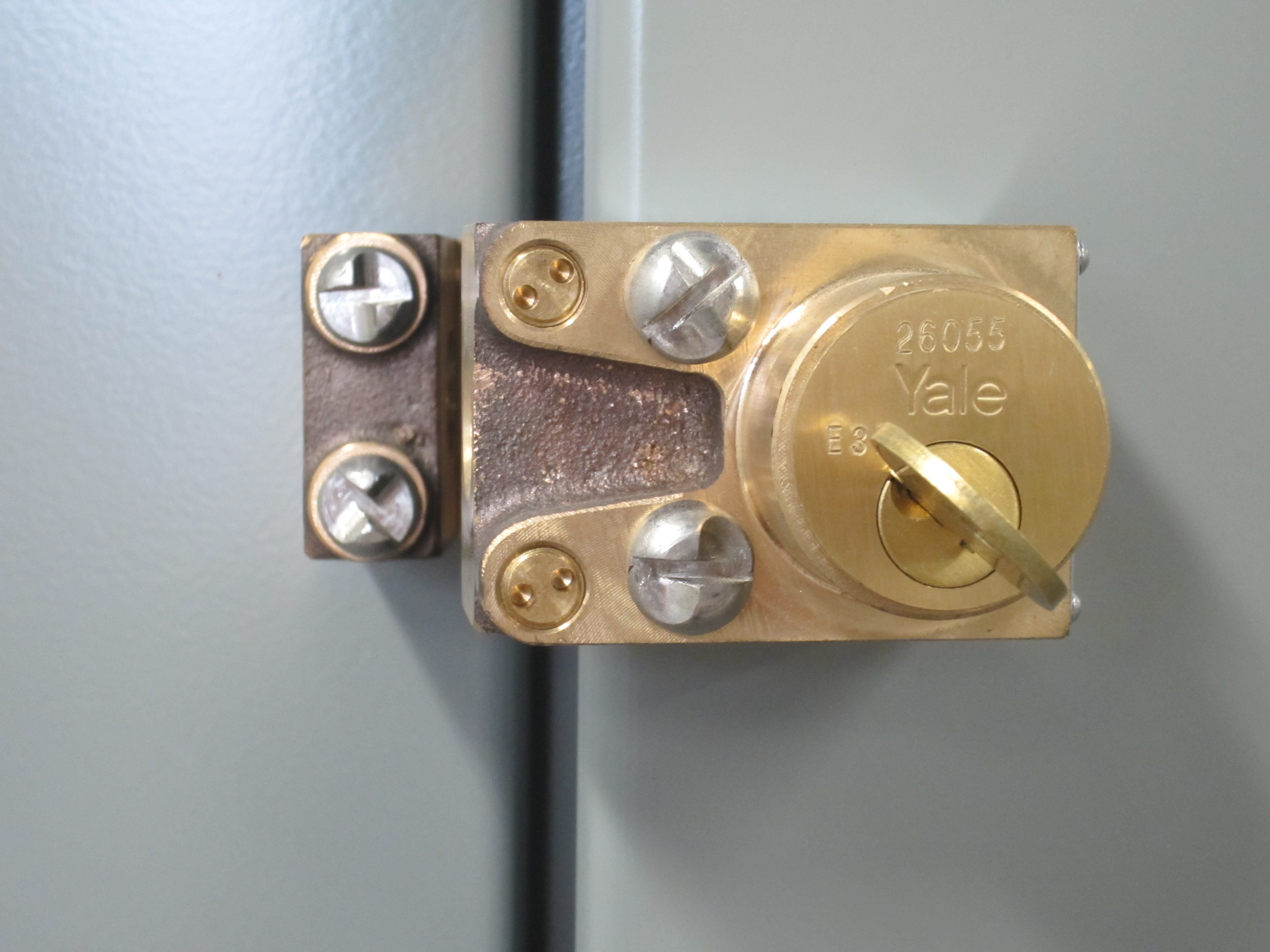
This is a trapped-key interlock on the door of an electrical switchgear cabinet. It is attached with one-way security screws to discourage casual removal, which would defeat the interlock scheme.

Trapped-key interlocking utilizes locks and keys for sequential control of equipment and machinery to ensure safe operation. Trapped-key interlocks are widely used to ensure safe access to potentially live or dangerous plant or equipment in an industrial setting.

A safe sequence of operations is enabled through transfer of keys that are either trapped or released in a predetermined order. For example, a key is used to isolate a power source (circuit breaker or supply valve), this key is then released and can then be used to gain access through a gate or door to a high risk area by inserting it into an access lock. The key will then remain trapped until the gate or door is closed. A personnel or safety key can be released from the access lock, this ensures that the gate or door can not be closed and the initial key released until this personnel or safety key is returned (assuming that no duplicate keys are available). This provides increased operator safety.

In 1893, French inventor Paul Bouré created engagement lock devices to ensure train traffic safety. They were used in the French railway system in the 1890s to control track switching operations and were manufactured by Trayvou, now known by the name "Serv Trayvou Interverrouillage" (STI) and owned by Halma. Later, the Englishman James Harry Castell (1880–1953), Frenchman B. Trayvou and the American R. L. Kirk also developed trapped-key interlocking systems. Therefore, such systems are commonly referred to as Castell, Bourré, Trayvou, or Kirk keys. Both worked in the power generation and distribution industries in the early part of the 20th century, and both pioneered the use of trapped-key interlock for switchgear control. Trapped-key interlocks can be found in many industrial settings including electrical utilities, railway, petroleum, and chemical plants as a response to occupational safety and health legislation.

== Interlock devices ==
A typical trapped-key interlock device consists of a lock cylinder which operates a sliding bolt through a cam. The assembly is contained in a housing, which is made in different styles to accommodate different applications. The sliding bolt, when extended, mechanically prevents operation of a switch, valve, gate, or other device. Many variations exist, with different shapes of interlock bolt and multiple lock cylinders on an interlock. A significant feature of the interlock is that the key is held or trapped in one position of the lock. Releasing the key indicates that the interlocked device has been made safe; the interlocked device cannot be re-energized until the key has been returned and operated to retract the bolt.

Some complex sequences use key exchange blocks or boxes, that allow alternative sequences of operation. Interlock devices may have an electrical solenoid which holds the key until an electrical circuit is interrupted; for example, the power supply for a high-voltage cabinet has been de-energized, releasing a key to allow access to the interior of the cabinet. Some interlocks include a time delay function or a rotation detector to ensure a machine has had time to come to a stop before allowing the next step of an interlock sequence to proceed. A key exchange block may only hold and release keys and may not have a bolt to interlock process equipment, or may be part of the interlock of a particular machine or device.

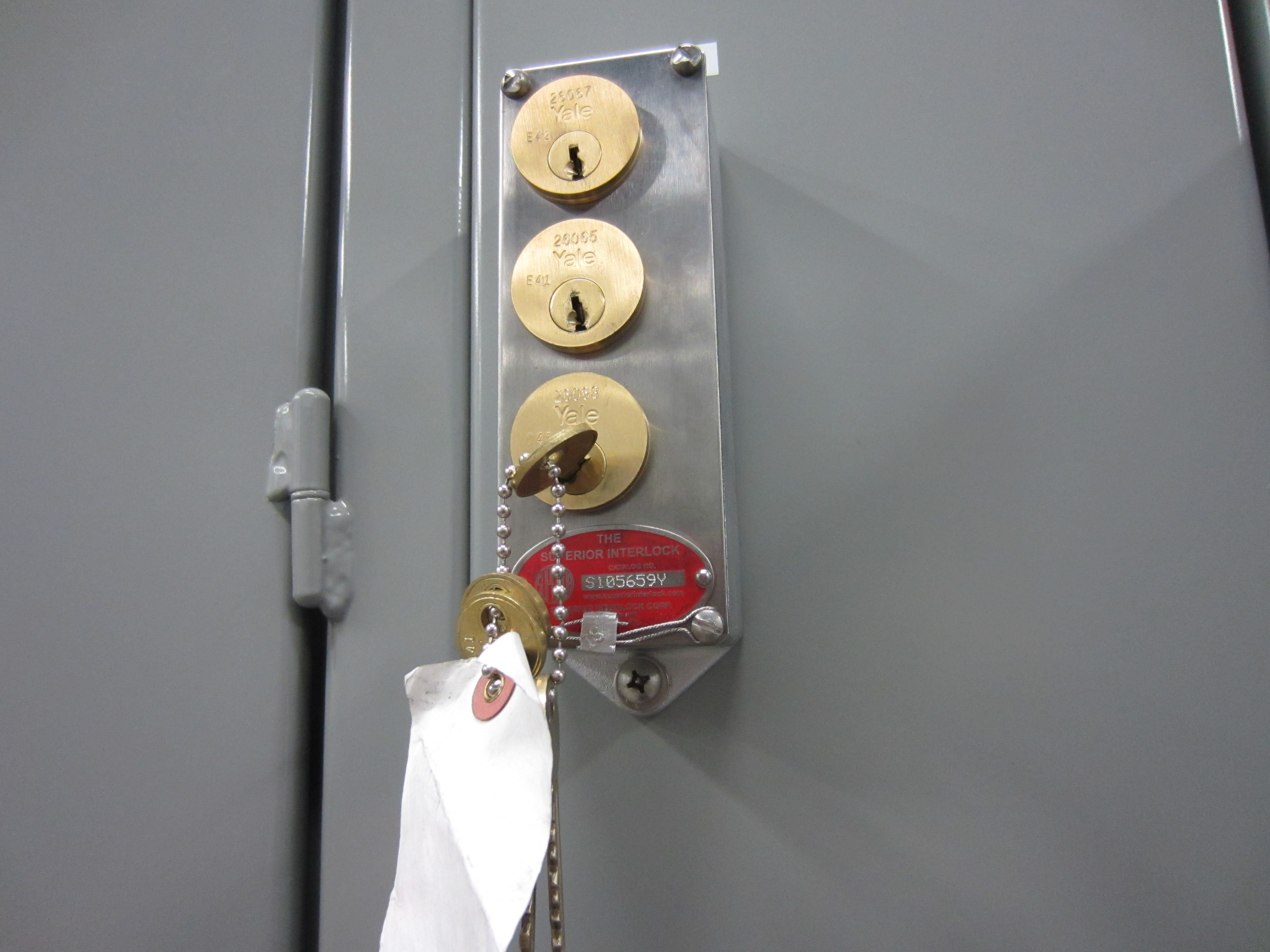
This is a transfer block, part of a trapped-key interlock system. It does not have a bolt to stop operation of a device, but holds and releases other keys.

Manufacturers of trapped-key interlock devices provide application guides showing typical interlock problems and recommended arrangements. Since the reliability and safety of the scheme critically depends on the possession of keys, duplicate keys must be carefully controlled to prevent any possibility of an unsafe operating sequence. For example, a lost key might be replaced only by a duplicate held off-site, or might require ordering a replacement from the original manufacturer.

== Example ==
For example, to prevent access to the inside of an electric kiln while it is operating, a trapped-key system may be used to interlock a disconnecting switch and the kiln door. Whenever the kiln power switch is turned on, the key is automatically held by the interlock, and cannot be manually removed. In order to open the kiln door, the power switch must first be turned off, which releases the key and allows it to be removed from the interlock. The key can then be used to unlock the kiln door. While the key is removed from the switch interlock, a plunger from the interlock mechanically prevents the power switch from being turned on. Power cannot be re-applied to the kiln until the kiln door is locked, releasing the key, and the key is then returned to the power switch interlock. A similar two-part interlock system can be used anywhere it is necessary to ensure the energy supply to a machine is interrupted before the machine is entered for adjustment or maintenance.

== See also ==
- Interlock
- Poka-yoke
