= Disconnector =

Electromechanical switch

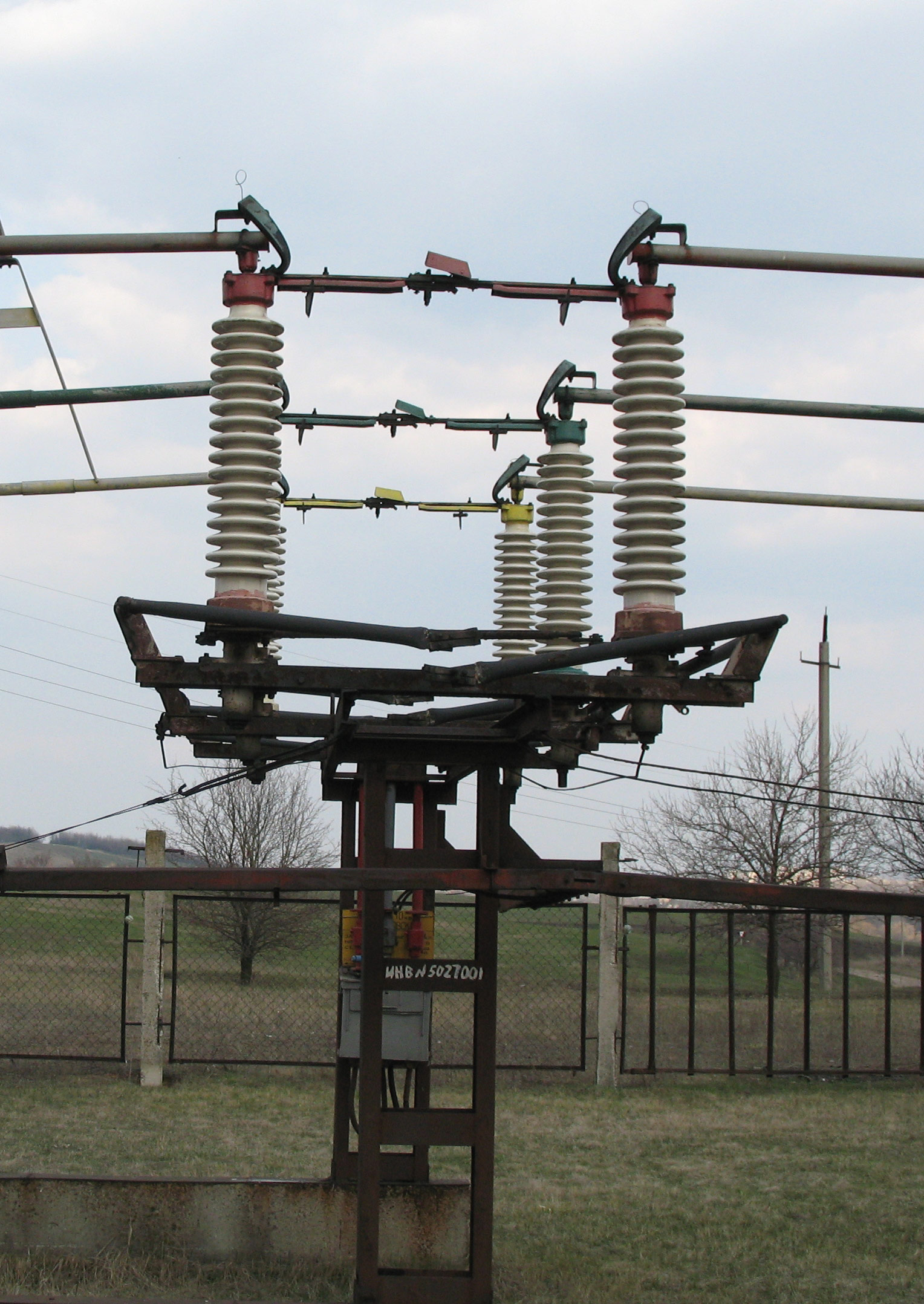
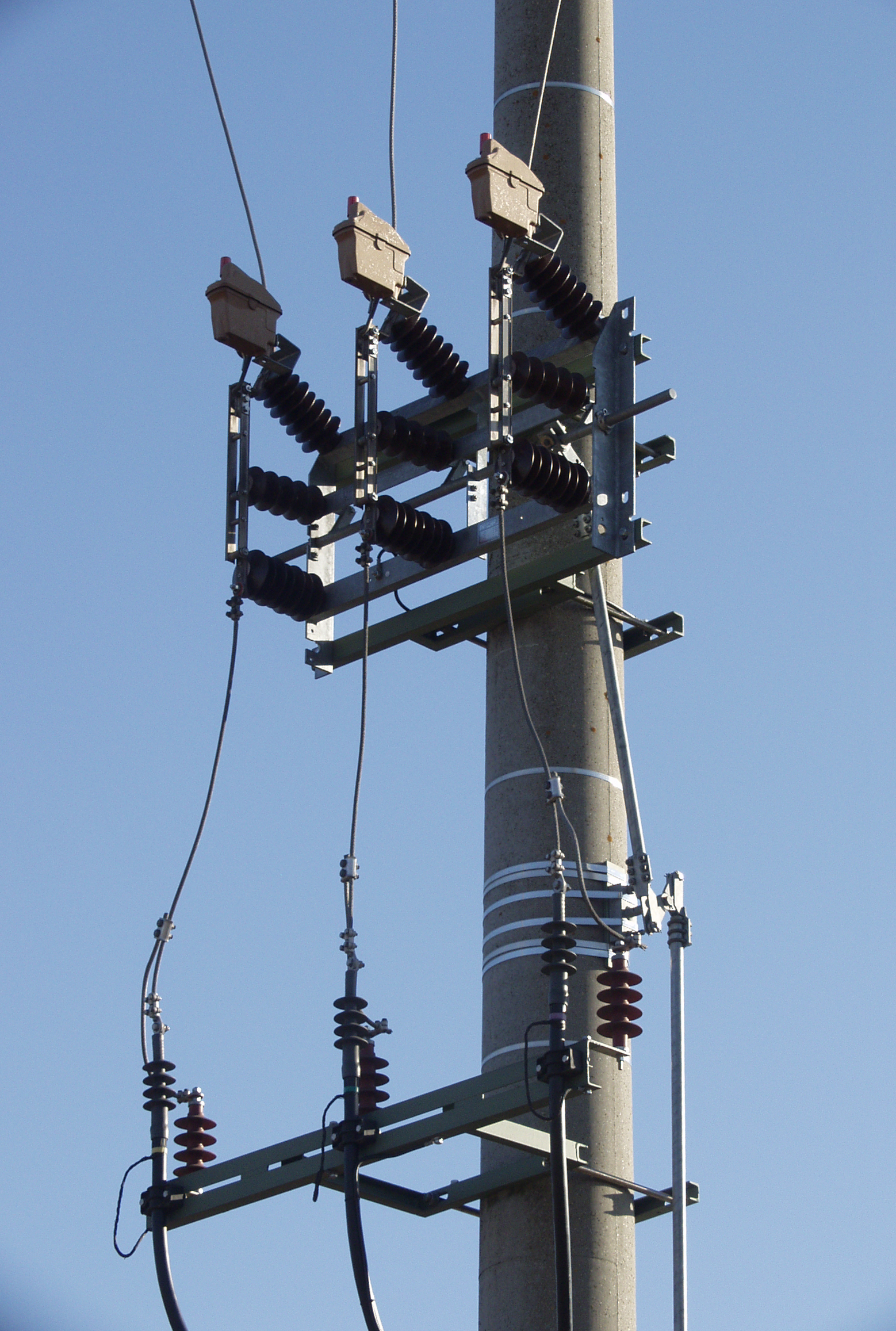
A high-voltage (left) and a medium-voltage disconnector (right)

In electrical engineering, a disconnector, disconnect switch or isolator switch is a type of switching device with visible contacts, used to ensure that an electrical circuit is completely de-energized for service or maintenance. They are often found in electrical distribution and industrial applications, where machinery must have its source of driving power removed for adjustment or repair. Disconnectors can be operated manually or by a motor, and may be paired with an earthing switch to ground the portion that has been isolated from the system for ensuring the safety of equipment and the personnel working on it.

High-voltage disconnectors are used in electrical substations to allow isolation of apparatus such as circuit breakers, transformers, and transmission lines, for maintenance. The disconnector is usually not intended for normal control of the circuit, but only for safety isolation. Unlike load switches and circuit breakers, disconnectors lack a mechanism for suppression of electric arcs which occur when conductors carrying high currents are mechanically interrupted. Thus, they are off-load devices, with very low breaking capacity, intended to be opened only after the current has been interrupted by some other control device. Safety regulations of the utility must prevent any attempt to open the disconnector while it supplies a circuit. Standards in some countries for safety may require either local motor isolators or lockable handles (which can be padlocked).

IEC standard 62271-102 defines the functionality and features of a disconnector.

Disconnectors have provisions for a lockout-tagout so that inadvertent operation is not possible. In high-voltage or complex systems, these locks may be part of a trapped-key interlock system to ensure proper sequence of operation. In some designs, the disconnector has the additional ability to earth the isolated circuit thereby providing additional safety. Such an arrangement would apply to circuits that interconnect power distribution systems where both ends of the circuit need to be isolated.

== Types of disconnectors ==
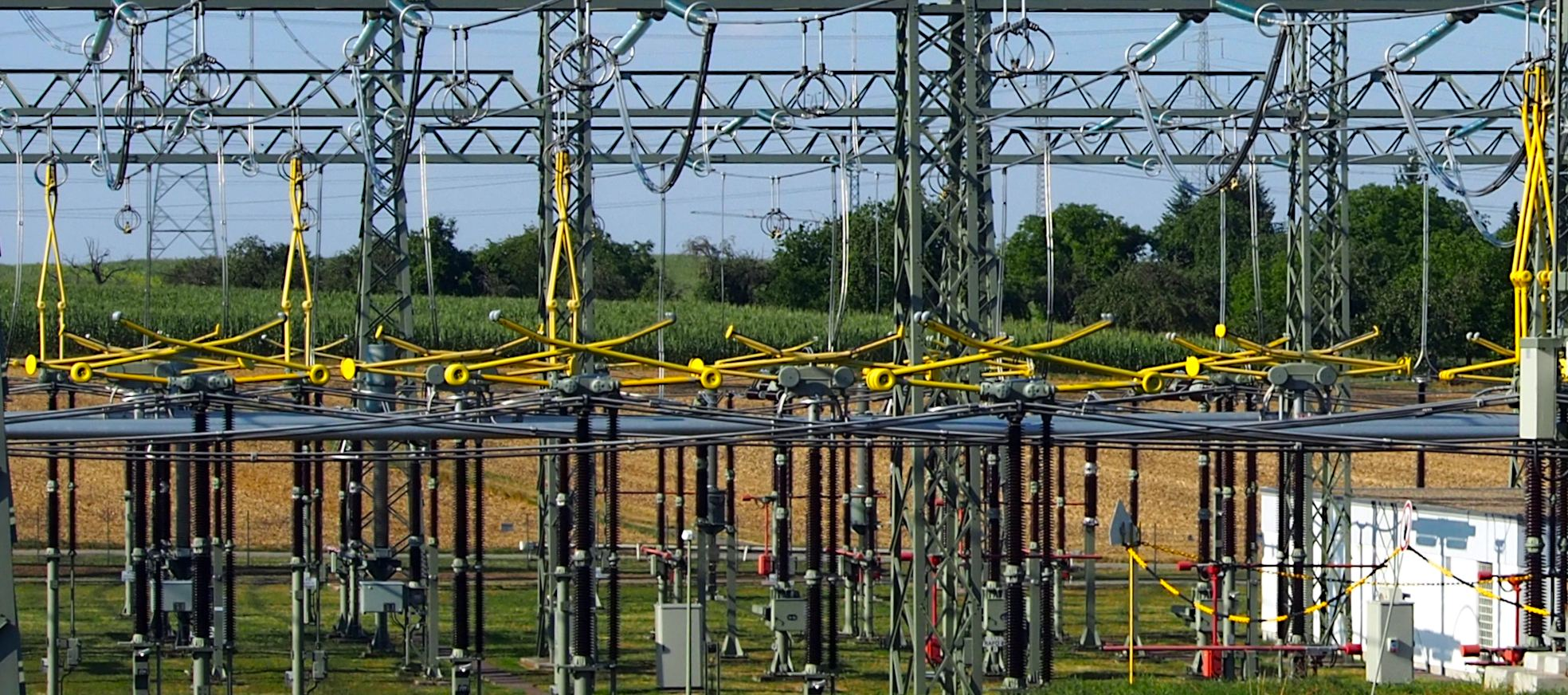
Pantograph disconnectors for 220kV. Yellow painting allows recognition of their state

Disconnectors can be classified into various types based upon their constructional features and mounting arrangement. The major types of disconnectors are:

- Centre-break disconnectors
- Double-break disconnectors
- Pantograph disconnectors
- Horizontal break knee disconnectors
- Vertical break disconnectors
- Coaxial disconnectors

These are selected based upon the sub-station layout, clearances available and space constraints.

=== Switch disconnector ===
A switch disconnector combines the properties of a disconnector and a load switch, so it provides the safety isolation function while being able to make and break nominal currents.

=== Integrated disconnecting switch ===
In a disconnecting circuit breaker the disconnectors are integrated in the breaking chamber, which eliminates the need for separate disconnectors. The intention of this combined device is to decrease maintenance and increase availability and reliability. The usage of this device instead of a disconnector is limited due to the fact that the open gap is not clearly visible and many doubts in terms of safety arise during maintenance activities. Where it is adopted the earthing switch must be used and the performance must be increased by the typical value.

The open-air disconnecting switches typically need maintenance every five years (every two years under very polluted conditions), while circuit breakers have maintenance intervals of 15 years.

== See also ==
- Circuit breaker
- Kill switch
- True DC
- Battery isolator
