= Knife switch =

Type of switch

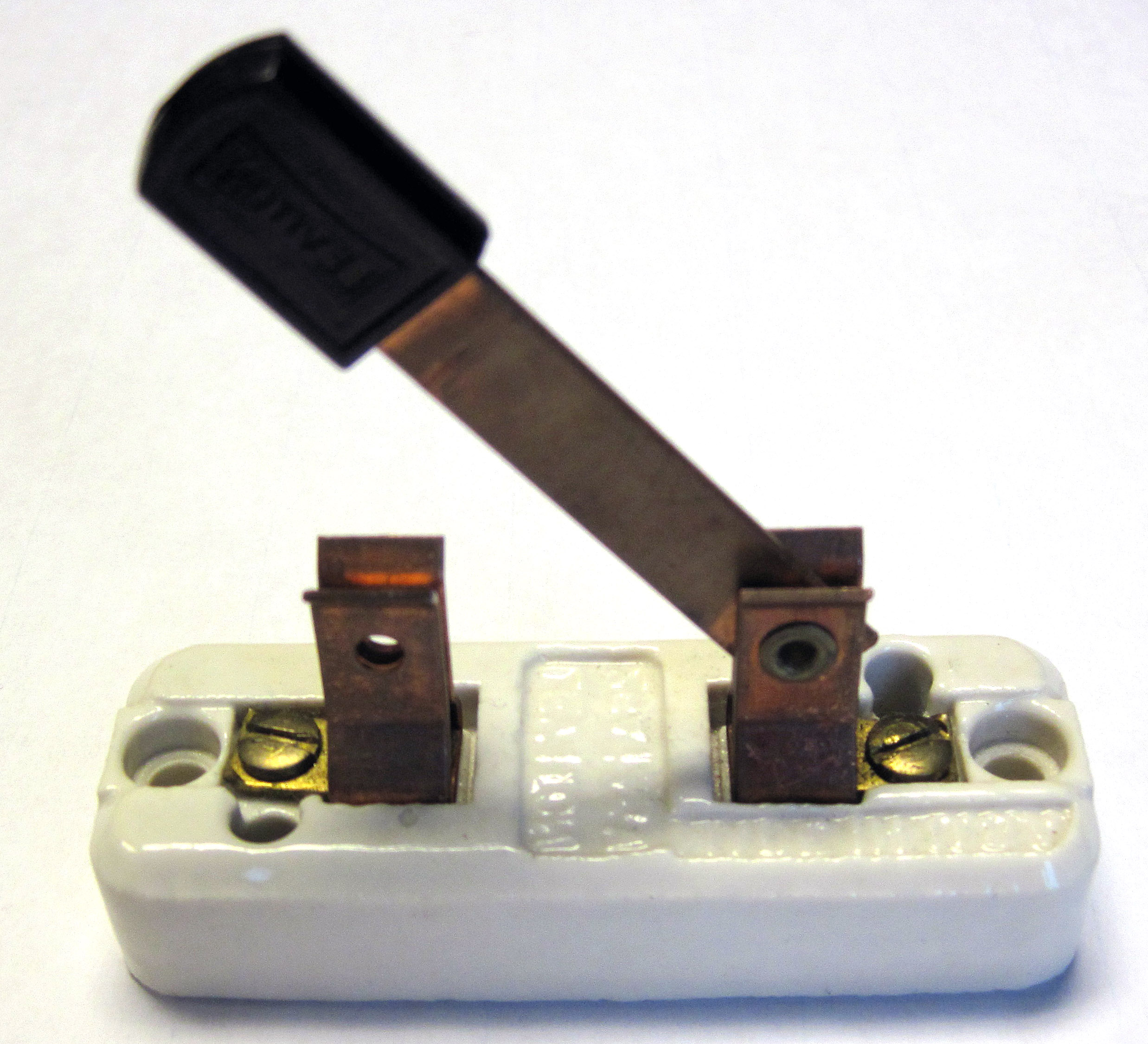
- Open single-pole single-throw (SPST) knife switch

Electronic symbol

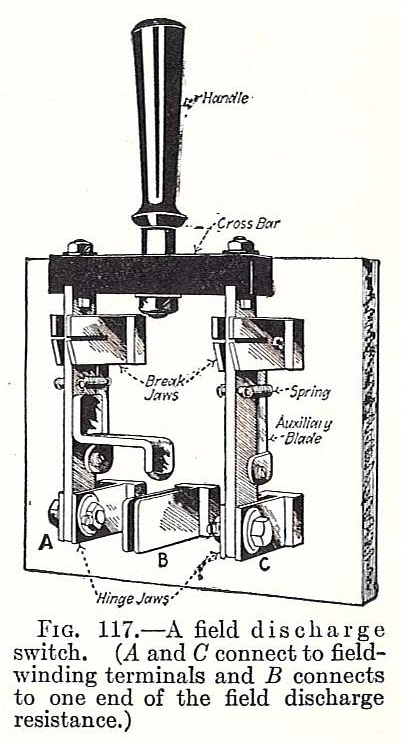
1917 motor switch, with extra contacts

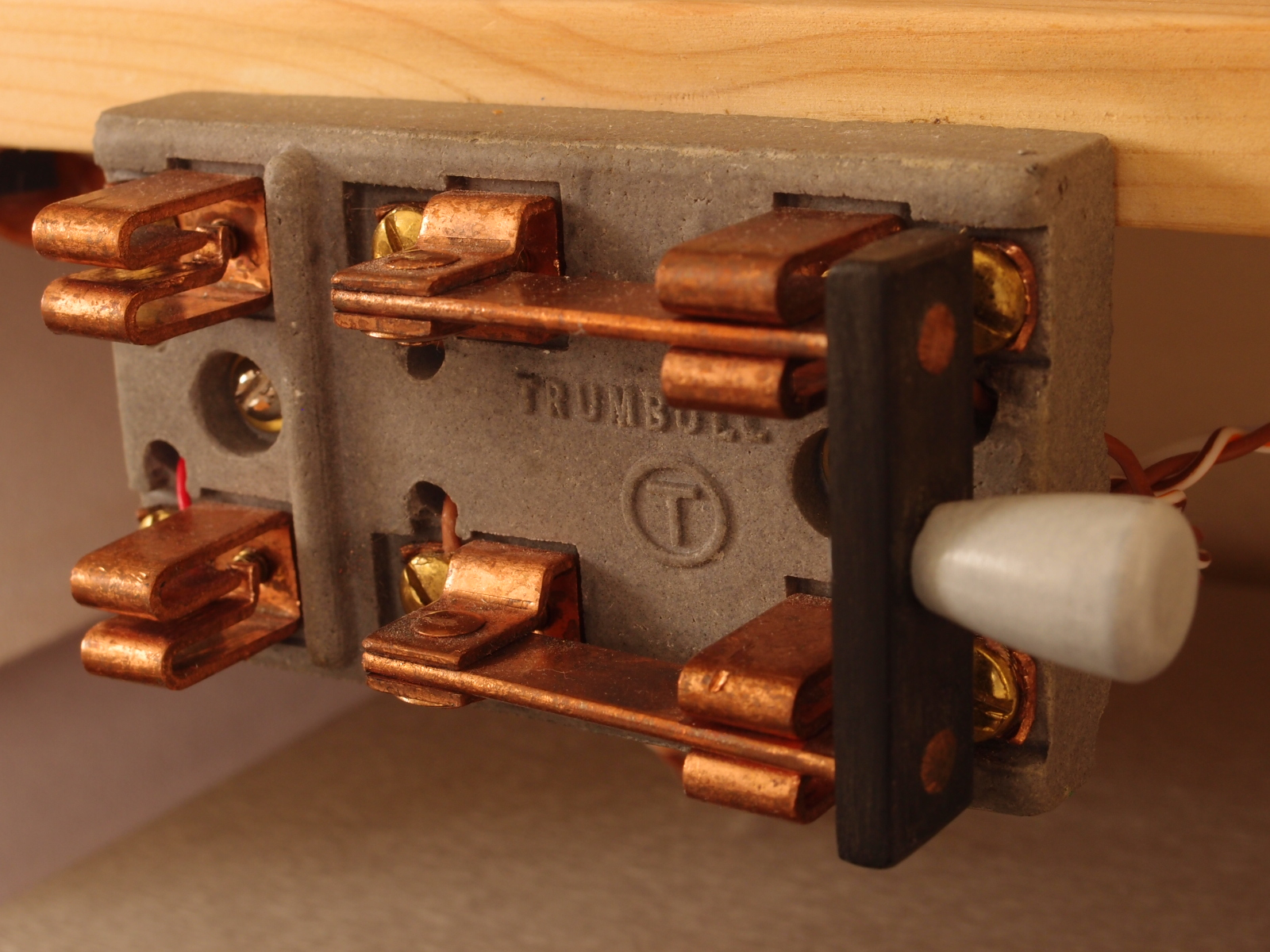
Dual-pole, dual-throw knife switch in one of its two closed positions

A knife switch is a type of switch used to control the flow of electricity in a circuit. It is composed of a hinge which allows a metal lever, or knife, to be lifted from or inserted into a slot or jaw. The hinge and jaw are both fixed to an insulated base, and the knife has an insulated handle. Current flows through the switch when the knife is pushed into the jaw. Knife switches can take several forms, including single-throw, in which the knife engages with only a single slot, and double-throw, in which the knife hinge is placed between two slots and can engage with either one. Multiple knives may be attached to a single handle and can be used to activate more than one circuit simultaneously; this is a multi-pole switch.

== Operation ==
Current flows through the switch when the knife is in the jaw. When the switch is opened under load, an arc may cause burns. At higher voltages or currents this arc can be sustained, risking vaporization or explosions. Because the blade and jaw are fully exposed, operators are also at risk of electric shock from accidental contact with live parts.

== History ==
Early electrical equipment was relatively simple, with control consisting of knife switch and a manual controller. As electrical systems grew in voltage, the increasing hazards of shocks required safety rules and equipment. Open knife switches were supplanted by safety switches with current-carrying contacts inside metal enclosures which can only be opened by switching off the power.

In modern applications, automatic switches (such as contactors and relays) and manual switches such as circuit breakers are used. These devices use snap-action mechanisms which open the switch contacts rapidly and feature arc chutes where the arcs caused by opening the switches are quenched. These devices also prevent injury due to accidental contact, as all of the current–carrying metal parts of the switch are surrounded by insulating guards.

== Current uses ==
Though used commonly in the past, knife switches are now rare, finding use largely in science demonstrations where the exposed mechanics of the switch make its function and state visually apparent. The knife switch is extremely simple in construction and use, but for any dangerous electrical supply its exposed metal parts present a great risk of electric shock, and the switch is subject to arcing when opened at higher voltages, which poses a further risk of shock or burns to the operator and can cause fires or explosions under certain conditions.

A knife switch enables triggering an arc when desired in some DC solar systems.
