= Voltage transformer =

Type of electrical transformer

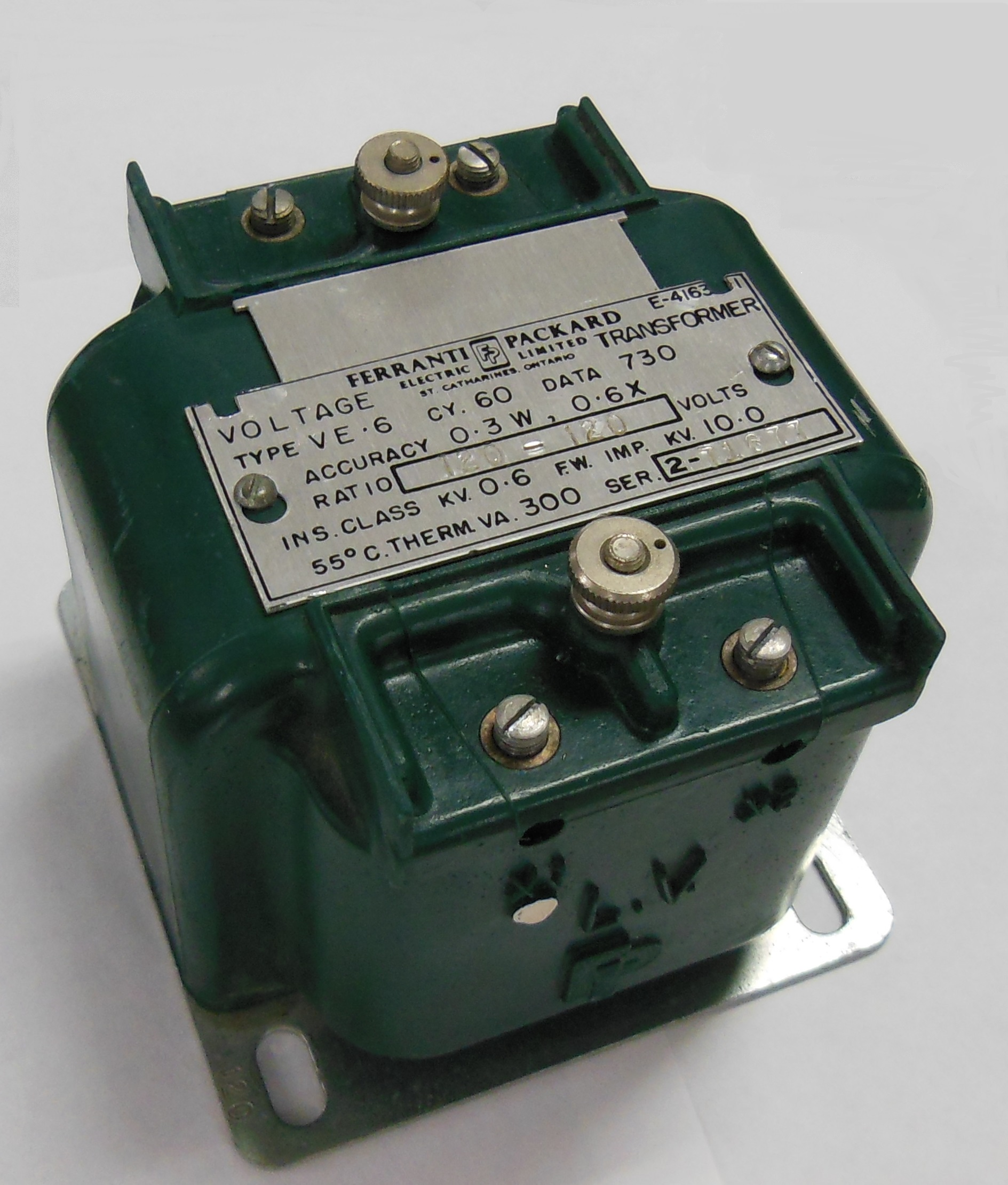
A 120:120 instrument isolation transformer showing two polarity marking conventions

Voltage transformers (VT), also called potential transformers (PT), are a parallel-connected type of instrument transformer. They are designed to present a negligible load to the supply being measured and have an accurate voltage ratio and phase relationship to enable accurate secondary connected metering.

== Ratio ==
The PT is typically described by its voltage ratio from primary to secondary. A 600:120 PT will provide an output voltage of 120 volts when 600 volts are impressed across its primary winding. Standard secondary voltage ratings are 120 volts and 70 volts, compatible with standard measuring instruments.

== Burden and accuracy ==
Burden and accuracy are usually stated as a combined parameter due to being dependent on each other. Metering style PTs are designed with smaller cores and VA capacities than power transformers. This causes metering PTs to saturate at lower secondary voltage outputs saving sensitive connected metering devices from damaging large voltage spikes found in grid disturbances. A small PT (see nameplate in photo) with a rating of 0.3W, 0.6X would indicate with up to W load (12.5 watts) of secondary burden the secondary current will be within a 0.3 percent error parallelogram on an accuracy diagram incorporating both phase angle and ratio errors. The same technique applies for the X load (25 watts) rating except inside a 0.6% accuracy parallelogram.

== Markings ==
Transformer winding primary (usually high-voltage) connecting wires are of many types. They may be labeled as H_{1}, H_{2} (sometimes H_{0} if it is internally designed to be grounded) and X_{1}, X2 and sometimes an X_{3} tap may be present. Sometimes a second isolated winding (Y_{1}, Y_{2}, Y_{3}) (and third (Z_{1}, Z_{2}, Z_{3}) may also be available on the same voltage transformer. The primary may be connected phase to ground or phase to phase. The secondary is usually grounded on one terminal to avoid capacitive induction from damaging low-voltage equipment and for human safety.

== Types of voltage transformers ==
There are three primary types of potential transformers (PT): electromagnetic, capacitor, and optical.

- An electromagnetic potential transformer is a wire-wound transformer.
- An optical voltage transformer exploits the Faraday effect, rotating polarized light, in optical materials.
- A capacitor voltage transformer, or capacitive voltage transformer uses a capacitive voltage divider to reduce the line voltage before applying it to an ordinary electromagnetic transformer.

=== capacitor voltage transformer ===
A capacitor voltage transformer (CVT), is a transformer used in power systems to step down extra high voltage signals and provide a low voltage signal to the actual VT (voltage transformer) used for operating metering/protective relays due to a lower cost than an electromagnetic PT.

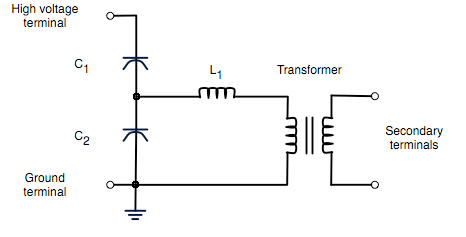
The circuit diagram for a simple capacitor voltage transformer

In its most basic form, the device consists of three parts: a two capacitor voltage divider across the transmission line, an inductive element to tune the device to the line frequency, and a voltage transformer to isolate and further step down the voltage for metering devices or protective relay.

The tuning of the divider to the line frequency makes the overall division ratio less sensitive to changes in the burden of the connected metering or protection devices. The device has at least four terminals: a terminal for connection to the high voltage signal, a ground terminal, and two secondary terminals which connect to the instrumentation or protective relay.

Capacitor C_{1} is often constructed as a stack of smaller capacitors connected in series. This provides a large voltage drop across C_{1} and a relatively small voltage drop across C_{2}. As the majority of the voltage drop is on C_{1}, this reduces the required insulation level of the voltage transformer. This makes CVTs more economical than the wound voltage transformers under high voltage (over 100 kV), as the latter one requires more winding and materials.

In communication systems, CVTs in combination with wave traps are used for filtering high-frequency communication signals from power frequency. This forms a carrier communication network throughout the transmission network, to communicate between substations.
