= SY control cable =

An SY control cable is a flexible instrumentation electrical cable designed for measuring, control or regulation in the field of process automation. It is a flexible multicore cable, with (class 5) copper conductors and a galvanised steel wire braid (GSWB) for mechanical protection. The cable is typically manufactured with PVC insulation, bedding and a transparent PVC sheath. The transparent sheath means signs of deterioration, damage or corrosion can be detected with ease.

SY has a voltage rating of 300/500V.

SY cable should not be used on voltages above ELV in the UK as the braid does not meet BS 7671 for current carrying capacity under fault conditions. Only cables mentioned in BS 7671 should be used unless the designer can show that the cable used meets the same standards. Although the combined cross sectional area of the braid may meet the adiabatic equation requirements for earthing, the nature of the braid being made of very fine strands coupled with the comparatively large gaps, when compared to SWA cable, means that under short circuit conditions the fine strands can melt and so the braid will no longer be in contact with a penetrating object such as a screw or nail

Some SY cables on the market are of poor standard, with cases of GSWB coverage being less than 20%. With no standard set, poor quality cables are available on the market at low procurement costs - but this cable's life will be substantially lower. A GSWB coverage of above 55% attains to acceptable standard SY.

== Uses ==
SY control cables are not suitable for fixed wiring applications in the UK requiring compliance with the requirements set out in BS 7671.

SY cable should not be used in areas exposed to ultraviolet light as it damages the outer sheath leading to cracking and then rusting of the braid as water penetrates the damaged sheath.

== Origin of the name SY ==
In CENELEC code – the European Committee for Electrotechnical Standardization – the S in SY stands for steel wire braid, and the Y for PVC. SY Control Cable can be referred to more generally as Instrumentation Cable, Flexible or Braided Control Cable and Control Flex.

== CY and YY control cables ==
There are three different types of Control Cable in the area of process automation: CY, YY and SY Cable. With its GSWB braid SY is suited to installations with medium to high mechanical stress. YY and CY Control Cable are very similar in construction, but without the mechanical protection provided by the steel wire. YY is a versatile cable that works well in environments with only light mechanical stress and CY Cable has a tinned copper wire braid and polyester binder tape, which provide protection against external electromagnetic influences.

== See also ==
- Electrical cable
