= DCL =

DCL or .dcl may refer to:

- 650 in Roman numerals, see 650 (disambiguation)

== Computers ==
- Data Center Linux, see Open Source Development Labs
- Data Control Language, a subset of SQL
- Dialog Control Language, a language and interpreter within AutoCAD
- DIGITAL Command Language, the command language used by most of the operating systems from the former Digital Equipment Corporation (DEC)
- Double-checked locking, a software design pattern
- .dcl, source code files for Clean (programming language)
- .dcl, Delphi Control Library files for Embarcadero Delphi

== Military ==
- Char de dépannage DNG/DCL, armoured recovery vehicle

== Degrees ==
- Doctor of Canon Law, for studies of canon law of the Roman Catholic Church
- Doctor of Civil Law, an alternative to the Doctor of Laws (LL.D.) degree

== Organizations ==
- Data Connection Ltd, a former name of Metaswitch
- Detroit College of Law, now known as the Michigan State University College of Law
- Disney Cruise Line, a cruise line company (United States)

== Places ==
- Deep Creek Lake State Park, a Maryland state park in Garrett County, United States

== Science, technology, and medicine ==
- DCL Technology Demonstrator programme, a torpedo detection system (U.K.)
- Device for Connection of Luminaires, a European plug and socket system for connecting lighting equipment
- DICER-like, family of plant genes
- Direct coal liquefaction
- Deuterium chloride, DCl, a form of hydrogen chloride using deuterium atoms

== Sports and games ==
- Dual County League, a high school athletic conference in Massachusetts, United States
- Drone Champions League, a drone racing league
- Dominic Calvert-Lewin, an English professional footballer
