= Mary Capelli-Schellpfeffer =

American physician

Mary Capelli-Schellpfeffer is an American physician specializing in electrical injury and electrical safety. She works in Boston as a vice president for Liberty Mutual, and as Liberty Mutual's national director for workers' compensation. She is a coauthor of the Electrical Safety Handbook (third and subsequent editions, with John Cadick and Dennis Neitzel, McGraw-Hill, 2005) and coeditor of Electrical Injury: A Multidisciplinary Approach to Therapy, Prevention, and Rehabilitation (with Raphael Carl Lee and Kathleen M. Kelley, New York Academy of Sciences, 1994).

Capelli-Schellpfeffer is a 1974 graduate of Mary D. Bradford High School in Kenosha, Wisconsin. She is the daughter of Paul A. Capelli, a United States Air Force captain, obstetrician, and medical administrator in Kenosha, and his wife, Mary MacGillis Capelli. Capelli-Schellpfeffer's husband, Michael A. Schellpfeffer, is also a physician who practiced with her father in the 1980s and 1990s. Prior to her work with Liberty Mutual, she practiced medicine in Kenosha herself, worked at the University of Chicago as director of its hyperbaric oxygen unit and in its Electrical Trauma Program, and later was the Loyola University Chicago Health System Occupational Health Services medical director.

Capelli-Schellpfeffer was the 2003 recipient of the Electrical Safety Excellence Award of the IEEE Industry Applications Society Petroleum and Chemical Industry Committee. She was elected as an IEEE Fellow in 2006, "for contributions to the prevention and treatment of electric shock and arc blast injury".
