= IEC 61010 =

Safety standards for laboratory electrical equipment

The IEC 61010 series of international standards, entitled "Safety requirements for electrical equipment for measurement, control, and laboratory use", are published by the International Electrotechnical Commission (IEC). The standards are written and maintained by IEC TC 66.

== EU Application ==
Most parts of the standard are harmonized by CENELEC as EN standards. Those that are harmonized are published in the Official Journal of the EU (PDF Version). Products that meet the requirements of a harmonized standard enjoy Presumption of Conformity to the Low Voltage Directive.

== Parts ==
IEC 61010 comprises multiple parts. The -1 part covers general requirements. Many pieces of equipment will also be within the scope of one or more -2 subparts, which are to be read in conjunction with the -1 part. The exception to this is equipment within the scope of IEC 61010-031, which is a complete standard on its own.

The standard includes the following parts:

- Part 1: General requirements
- Part 2-010: Particular requirements for laboratory equipment for the heating of Materials
- Part 2-011: Particular requirements for refrigerating equipment
- Part 2-012: Particular requirements for climatic and environmental testing and other temperature conditioning equipment
- Part 2-020: Particular requirements for laboratory centrifuges
- Part 2-030: Particular requirements for equipment having testing or measuring circuits
- Part 2-032: Particular requirements for hand-held and hand-manipulated current sensors for electrical test and measurement
- Part 2-033: Particular requirements for hand-held multimeters for domestic and professional use, capable of measuring mains voltage
- Part 2-034: Particular requirements for measurement equipment for insulation resistance and test equipment for electric strength
- Part 2-040: Particular requirements for sterilizers and washer-disinfectors used to treat medical materials
- Part 2-042: Particular requirements for autoclaves and sterilizers using toxic gas for the treatment of medical materials, and for laboratory processes (Withdrawn; replaced by Part 2-040)
- Part 2-051: Particular requirements for laboratory equipment for mixing and stirring
- Part 2-061: Particular requirements for laboratory atomic spectrometers with thermal atomization and ionization
- Part 2-081: Particular requirements for automatic and semi-automatic laboratory equipment for analysis and other purposes
- Part 2-091: Particular requirements for cabinet X-ray systems
- Part 2-101: Safety requirements for in vitro diagnostic (IVD) medical equipment
- Part 2-102: Particular requirements for gas, oil and solid-fuel burning appliances having electrical connections
- Part 2-130: Particular requirements for equipment intended to be used in educational establishments by children
- Part 2-201: Particular requirements for control equipment
- Part 2-202: Particular requirements for electrically operated valve actuators
- Part 031: Safety requirements for hand-held and hand-manipulated probe assemblies for electrical test and measurement
