= Raphael Carl Lee =

American surgeon and academic

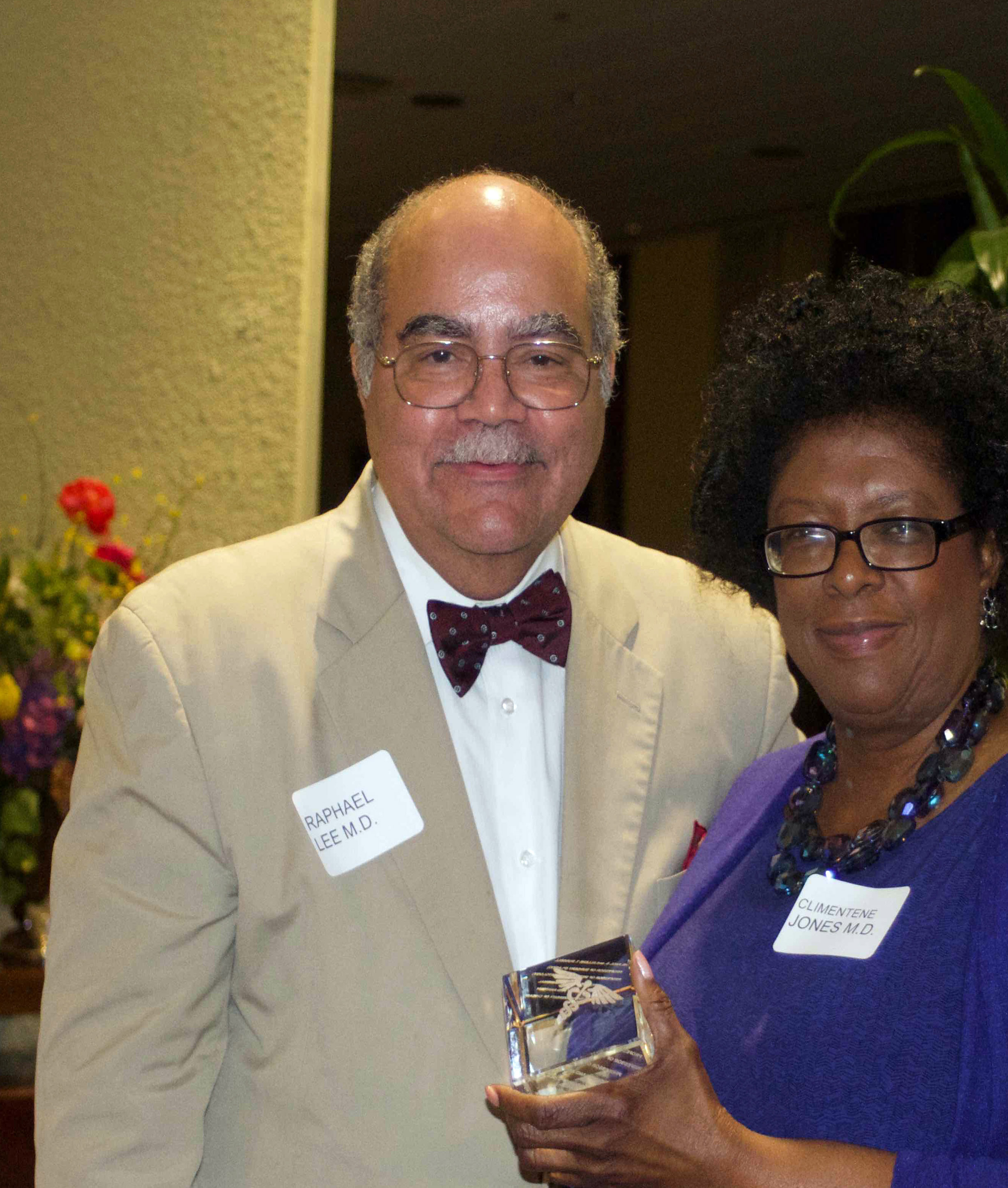
Dr. Lee receiving the Daniel Hale Williams Award from Dr. Jones of the Cook County Medical Society

Raphael Lee (born 1949) is an American surgeon, biomedical engineer and inventor. He is the Paul and Allene Russell Distinguished Service Professor Emeritus at the University of Chicago and Director of Renacyte BioMolecular Technologies, Inc.

== Early life and education ==
Raphael Carl Lee was born in 1949, in Sumter, South Carolina, to a family of physicians (his father, uncles, and cousins). He graduated from high school in 1967, before enrolling in the University of South Carolina to study electrical engineering. He obtained a Bachelor of Science in electrical engineering from the University of South Carolina in 1971. Lee then earned Medical Doctorate and Masters of Science in Biomedical Engineering in a coordinated graduate studies program Drexel University and Temple University School of Medicine in 1975. He completed his general surgery residency at University of Chicago in 1981. He also completed a Doctor of Science degree program in electrical engineering Massachusetts Institute of Technology n 1979, with a specializing in continuum electromechanics. Lee went on to complete a residency in plastic surgery at Massachusetts General Hospital in 1983. During his residencies, he received several awards for his research, including the Schering Scholar Award in 1978 from the American College of Surgeons. Lee was also one of the early recipients of the MacArthur Fellowship Award in 1981, and Searle Scholar Award in 1985.

== Career ==
Lee practiced plastic surgery in Boston and Chicago and was regularly listed locally and nationally as a leading surgeon. He served as Director of Plastic Surgery at the West Roxbury VA Hospital (Massachusetts), Director, University of Chicago's Burn Center, as well as for the Electrical Trauma Program. In 2016 he was named a Senior Clinical Scholar Bucksbaum Institute for Clinical Excellence. In 2020, he received the University of Chicago's Alumni Association Golden Key Award for outstanding service to the University.

Lee has combined a clinical surgery practice with his research efforts, primary in the areas of the molecular biophysics of cell injury resulting from physical trauma such as burns and electrical injury. He has served on the faculties of the Massachusetts Institute of Technology Harvard University, University of Chicago and at the Chicago Electrical Trauma Research Institute. A few years after the 1986 Chernobyl nuclear disaster he served on the UN-WHO Radiation Program expert advisory committee which included leading a sub-committee to estimate the health economic impact of the Chernobyl nuclear disaster on Belarus.

Lee is a member of the Association for Academic Surgery, Society of University Surgeons and the American Surgical Association. He is Past-President of the Midwestern Association of Plastic Surgeons and the American Institute for Medical and Biological Engineering . As a result of his scientific contributions, he was elected to Fellowship status of American Association for the Advancement of Science, Biomedical Engineering Society, Institute for Electrical and Electronic Engineers (IEEE).. Lee has served on several National Institute of Health and National Science Foundation advisory committees and councils. Lee and Michael Kolodney received the James Barrett Brown Award in I988 from the American Association of Plastic Surgeons for their publication regarding the multi-physical nature of electrical shock injuries. Most recently, his research team is working to develop methods to assess and improve patient physiological fitness for major surgery and to integrate control systems science into pharmacology.

Lee has been elected to the National Academy of Engineering, the International Academy of Medical and Biological Engineering, and the American Academy of Arts and Sciences.

== Scientific Contributions ==
Lee's primary research has been and continues to be focused on the biophysical pathogenesis and treatment of trauma especially electrical shock injuries. Several discoveries have emerged from that effort. In 1992, his laboratory was the first to report a clinically applicable method to seal disrupted cell membranes resulting in a fundamentally new method for protecting injured cells and tissues. Lee is recognized for discovering the application of certain classes of amphiphilic block copolymers to mimic several fundamental protective processes of natural stress proteins in cells that perform cellular self-repair capability following injury. Today that technology is utilized protein manufacturing and medical practice. In 2002, that team reported a method for disaggregating and recovering function of heat denatured enzymes using biocompatible amphiphilic block copolymers. In addition, Lee and his coworkers were the first to report the efficacy of organic L-Type calcium channel blockers as stimulators of matrix metalloprotease biosynthesis in scar cells which is now widely used for treatment of scar contracture diseases. Lee's research has resulted more than 25 patents. Lee's patents have led to the founding of Avocet Polymer Technologies, Inc., Maroon Biotech Corp , and Electrokinetic Signal Research, Inc. all of Chicago, Illinois.

Lee is also cofounder of the Chicago Electrical Trauma Rehabilitation Institute which is an academic clinical research organization entirely focused in determining the pathophysiology, clinical manifestations and effective medical intervention strategies for survivors of electrical shock injury that exhibit neuromuscular, neuropsychological and pain disorders. It is located in Chicago and maintains funded research and multi-university collaborations.

== Selected Awards ==
- Inducted, Alpha Omega Alpha Honor Medical Society, 1975, Lewis Katz Medical School
- Inducted, Tau Beta Pi Engineering Honor Society, 1975, Drexel University
- Inducted Sigma Xi Scientific Research Honor Society, 1980, Massachusetts Inst. of Tech.
- Schering Scholar in Surgery, American College of Surgeons
- Cited, Chicago Leading Physician
- 1981 Fellow MacArthur Fellows Program
- 1985 Scholar Searle Scholars Program
- Distinguished Medical Alumnus Award, Temple University School of Medicine
- Fellow, American Institute for Medical and Biological Engineering
- Life Fellow, Institute of Electrical and Electronics Engineers
- Fellow, Biomedical Engineering Society
- Fellow, American College of Surgeons
- Fellow, International College of Surgeons
- Fellow, American Association of Plastic Surgeons
- 1995 Lindberg Basic Science Award, American Burn Association
- 1998 Awarded Golden Key to City of Shanghai, Mayors Office
- 1996 Lindberg Basic Science Award, American Burn Association
- 2018 Pierre Galletti Award, American Institute for Medical and Biological Engineering
- Selected for inclusion in the Library of HistoryMakers
- Honoree, South Carolina History Calendar

== Works ==
- R. C. Lee; Ernest G. Cravalho; John Francis Burke, eds. (1992). Electrical trauma: the pathophysiology, manifestations and clinical management. Cambridge University Press. ISBN 978-0-521-38345-5.
- Raphael C Lee; Mary Capelli-Schellpfeffer; Kathleen M. Kelley, eds. (1994). Electrical Injury: A Multidisciplinary Approach to Prevention, Therapy & Rehabilitation. New York Academy of Sciences. ISBN 0-89766-864-2.
- Chin-tu Chen; Raphael C Lee; J-X Shih; Min-Ha Zhong, eds. (1999). Occupational Electrical Injury and Safety. New York Academy of Sciences. ISBN 1-57331-232-0.
- Raphael C Lee; Florin Despa; Kimm Jon Hamann, eds. (2005). Cell injury: mechanisms, responses, and repair. New York Academy of Sciences. ISBN 978-1-57331-616-3.
- Raphael C Lee and Anna Chien The Doctor's Plague: Germs, Childbed Fever, and the Strange Story of Ignac Semmelweis. (Book Review) Perspectives in Biology and Medicine - Volume 48, Number 4, Autumn 2005, pp. 616–618
- M. Capelli-Schellpfeffer and R.C.Lee, "Electrical Shock" in Encyclopedia of Electrical and Electronics Engineering, Webster, J.G., Ed., John Wiley and Sons, New York, 1998
- R. C. Lee, "Electrical and Lightning Injuries" in Harrison's Principles of Internal Medicine, 15th Edition, Braunwald et al., eds. McGraw-Hill, New York 2001
- Raphael C Lee, "Convolving Engineering and Medical Pedagogies for Training of Tomorrow's Health Care Professionals" IEEE Transactions on Biomedical Engineering (2013) 60:599, [DOI: 10.1109/TBME.2013.2243911]

Author or coauthor of more than 275 journal publications and book chapters
