= Double Switch =

Double Switch may refer to:

- Double switch (baseball), a type of player substitution
- Double-switch (basketball), a defensive move to counter a pick and roll by the offense
- Double Switch (video game), a 1993 release by Digital Pictures for Sega CD and other platforms
- Double switching, using a multipole switch to open or close both sides of an electrical circuit
