= Section 42 =

Section 42 can refer to:

- Section 42 of the Australian constitution
- In the US - Section 42 of the Internal Revenue Code - details the Low-Income Housing Tax Credit
- English Law - A section of the Mental Health Act 1983 dealing with involuntary commitment
- English Law - Section 42 of the Offences against the Person Act 1861 (now replaced) dealt with common assault and battery
- Section 42 of the Indian Penal Code, definition of "local law"
- In engineering, Section 42 of IEC 60364 standard defines Thermal protection criteria for electrical installations
