= Device for Connection of Luminaires =

Electrical light fixture connector

DCL
- Type: Ceiling lamp connector

Production history
- Designer: IEC
- Designed: 2005; 20 years ago
- Manufacturer: Elko, Legrand, Schneider Electric, Lébénoïd, more

General specifications
- Length: 24.2 mm + length of pins
- Width: 30.2 mm
- Audio signal: None
- Video signal: None
- Cable: Electrical
- Pins: 3
- Connector: DCL

Electrical
- Signal: 6 ampere
- Earth: Yes
- Max. voltage: 250 V AC
- Max. current: 6 A

Data
- Data signal: None

Pinout
| Pin 1 | Load | L |
| Pin 2 | Protective earth | PE |
| Pin 3 | Neutral | N |
- 3 on the plug, 6 inside the socket.

Device for Connection of Luminaires (DCL) is a European standard for ceiling light fixtures introduced in 2005 and refined in 2009. It uses 6 ampere. DCL must carry the CE marking as per the Low Voltage Directive. DCL is only allowed to be installed with ground.

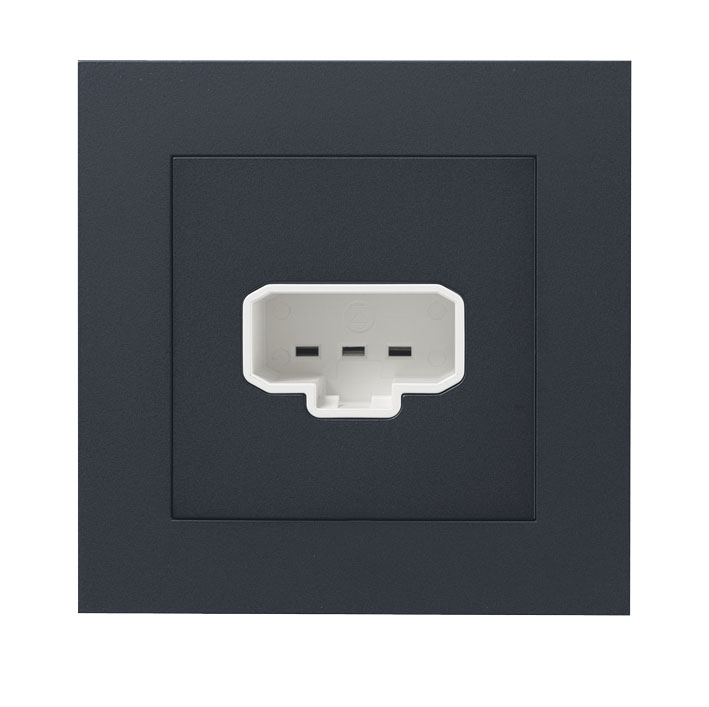
Example of DCL socket.

Plug (external)
| Pin | Color | Function |
|---|---|---|
| 1 | | Load (L) |
| 2 | | Protective earth |
| 3 | | Neutral (N) |

Socket internals
| Pin | Color | Function |
|---|---|---|
| 1 | | Load (L) |
| 2 | | Load (L) |
| 3 | | Protective earth |
| 4 | | Protective earth |
| 5 | | Neutral (N) |
| 6 | | Neutral (N) |

== Adoption ==
| Country | Notes |
|---|---|
| Austria | |
| Belgium | |
| Bulgaria | |
| Croatia | |
| Cyprus | |
| Czech Republic | |
| Denmark | |
| Estonia | |
| Finland | |
| France | Mandatory in new and renovated homes since 2001. Norme Française NF C 15-100. |
| Germany | |
| Greece | |
| Hungary | |
| Republic of Ireland | |
| Italy | |
| Latvia | |
| Lithuania | |
| Luxembourg | |
| Malta | |
| Netherlands | |
| Poland | |
| Portugal | |
| Romania | |
| Slovakia | |
| Slovenia | |
| Spain | |
| Sweden | Mandatory since April 1, 2019 |

Non-EU countries
| Country | Notes |
|---|---|
| Norway | Mandatory since December 31, 2010 |
| UK | Not mandatory, but recommended by the IET Wiring Regulations. |
