= MidMeds =

MidMeds Limited
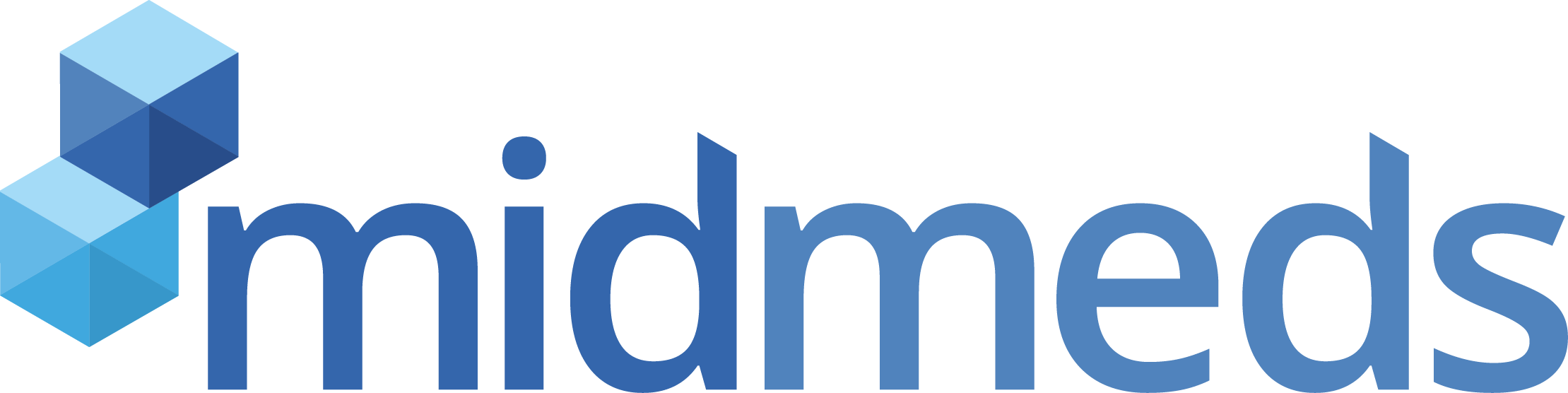
- Type: Private Company
- Industry: Healthcare Supplies and Calibration Services
- Founded: 2005
- Headquarters: Hertford, United Kingdom
- Products: Medical equipment, Medical consumables, Pharmaceutical; Testing and Calibration
- Website: https://www.midmeds.co.uk

MidMeds Limited is a UK supplier of medical equipment, consumables and pharmaceuticals. It is one of the largest suppliers to General Practitioners (GPs) in the UK with products ranging from consumables, surgical instruments and pharmaceuticals. In 2012 MidMeds opened a Test and Calibration division. Since launching, MidMeds has become one of the UK's leading test and calibration companies. The team of engineers perform on site equipment calibrations and PAT Testing, as required by the CQC.

Founded in 2005, the company quickly outgrew its original head office of Loughton, Essex and moved to a new building and distribution centre based in Nazeing, Essex. In 2017, MidMeds again moved to a larger premises, this time located in Hertford, Hertfordshire. MidMeds currently supplies to over 50 countries around the world. In 2016, MidMeds expanded into the Nursing Home Care market, launching a larger, specialist product range.

The company has a diverse range of customers, including primary care practices, NHS hospitals, private hospitals, doctors, surgeries, independent midwives, nurses and private consumers. MidMeds is the medical consumables, equipment, and testing supplier of the LMC Buying Group, a federation made up of 53 buying groups across England, Wales and Northern Ireland.
