= Appliance classes =

Electrical appliance manufacturing industry protection classes

Appliance classes (also known as protection classes) specify measures to prevent dangerous contact voltages on unenergized parts, such as the metallic casing or chassis, of an electronic device. In the electrical appliance manufacturing industry, the following appliance classes are defined in IEC 61140 and used to differentiate between the protective-earth connection requirements of devices.

== Class 0 ==
These appliances have no protective-earth connection and feature only a single level of insulation between live parts and exposed metalwork. If permitted at all, Class 0 items are intended for use in dry areas only. A single fault could cause an electric shock or other dangerous occurrence, without triggering the automatic operation of any fuse or circuit breaker. Sales of such items have been prohibited in much of the world for safety reasons, for example in the UK by Section 8 of The Low Voltage Electrical Equipment (Safety) Regulations 1989 and New Zealand by the Electricity Act. A typical example of a Class 0 appliance is the old style of Christmas fairy lights. However, equipment of this class is common in some 120 V countries, and in much of the 230 V developing world, whether permitted officially or not. These appliances do not have their chassis connected to electrical earth. In many countries the plug of a Class 0 equipment is such that it cannot be inserted to grounded outlet like Schuko. The failure of such an equipment in a location where there are grounded equipment can cause fatal shock if one touches both. Any Class 1 equipment will act like a Class 0 equipment when connected to an ungrounded outlet.

== Class I ==
Green ground wire with yellow stripe

Symbol used to mark the Protective Earthing Conductor terminal of Class I equipment

Appliance Class I is not only based on the basic insulation, but the casing and other conductive parts are also connected with a low-resistant earth conductor. Hence, these appliances must have their chassis connected to electrical earth (US: ground) by a separate earth conductor (coloured green/yellow in most countries, green in India, US, Canada and Japan). The earth connection is achieved with a three-conductor mains cable, typically ending with three-prong AC connector which plugs into a corresponding AC outlet.

Plugs are designed such that the connection to the protective earth conductor should be the first connection when plugged in. It should also be the last to be broken when the plug is removed.

A fault in the appliance which causes a live conductor to contact the casing will cause a current to flow in the earth conductor. If large enough, this current will trip an over-current device (fuse or circuit breaker) and disconnect the supply. The disconnection time has to be fast enough not to allow fibrillation to start if a person is in contact with the casing at the time. This time and the current rating in turn sets a maximum earth resistance permissible. To provide supplementary protection against high-impedance faults it is common to recommend a residual-current device (RCD) also known as a residual current circuit breaker (RCCB), ground fault circuit interrupter (GFCI), or residual current operated circuit-breaker with integral over-current protection (RCBO), which will cut off the supply of electricity to the appliance if the currents in the two poles of the supply are not equal and opposite.

== Class 0I ==
Electrical installations where the chassis is connected to earth with a separate terminal, instead of via the mains cable. In effect this provides the same automatic disconnection as Class I, for equipment that otherwise would be Class 0.

== Class II ==
Class II symbol

A Class II or double insulated electrical appliance uses reinforced protective insulation in addition to basic insulation. Hence, it has been designed in such a way that it does not require a safety connection to electrical earth (ground).

The basic requirement is that no single failure can result in dangerous voltage becoming exposed so that it might cause an electric shock and that this is achieved without relying on an earthed metal casing. This is usually achieved at least in part by having at least two layers of insulating material between live parts and the user, or by using reinforced insulation.

In Europe, a double insulated appliance must be labelled Class II or double insulated or bear the double insulation symbol: ⧈ (a square inside another square). As such, the appliance should not be connected to an earth conductor because the high-impedance casing will cause only low-fault currents that are unable to trigger the fusible cut-out.

Insulated AC/DC power supplies (such as cell-phone chargers) are typically designated as Class II, meaning that the DC output wires are galvanically isolated from the AC input.

Caveat: The designation "Class II" should not be confused with the designation "Class 2", as the latter is unrelated to insulation (it originates from standard UL 1310, setting limits on maximum output voltage/current/power).

== Class IIFE ==
Class II FE symbol

These devices have a Functional Earth "FE". This differs from a protective earth ground in that it does not offer shock protection from a hazardous voltage. However, it does help to mitigate electromagnetic noise or EMI. This is often important in audio and medical design. Since they also include double insulation, users will not come into contact with any live parts.

== Class III ==
Class III symbol

A Class III appliance is designed to be supplied from a separated extra-low voltage (SELV) power source. The voltage from a SELV supply is low enough such that under normal conditions a person can safely come into contact with an energized conductor without risk of electrical shock. The additional safety features required by Class I and Class II appliances are therefore not required. Specifically, Class III appliances are designed without an earth conductor and should not be connected to the earth grounding of the SELV power source. For medical devices, compliance with Class III is not considered sufficient protection, and furthermore, stringent regulations apply to such equipment.

The Class III label does not guarantee a device's safety in any aspect other than electrical shock. Even at low voltages, abusive or unintended use (such as disassembly or incorrect installation) may still yield dangerous outcomes. Although there should be no risk of receiving an electrical shock from Class III appliances, other electrical hazards (such as overheating and fire) must still be considered. For instance, a laptop or mobile phone might qualify as a Class III appliance if it is charged via an external SELV adapter, even though the onboard battery could pose a fire risk.

== See also ==
- Double switching
- IP Code
- Mains power plug
- Portable appliance testing

== Sources ==
- IEC 61140: Protection against electric shock — Common aspects for installation and equipment. International Electrotechnical Commission. 2001. (formerly: IEC 536-2: Classification of electrical and electronic equipment with regard to protection against electric shock, 1992)
- BS 2754 : 1976 (1999): Memorandum. Construction of electrical equipment for protection against electric shock.
