= High voltage =

Electrical potential that is large enough to cause damage or injury

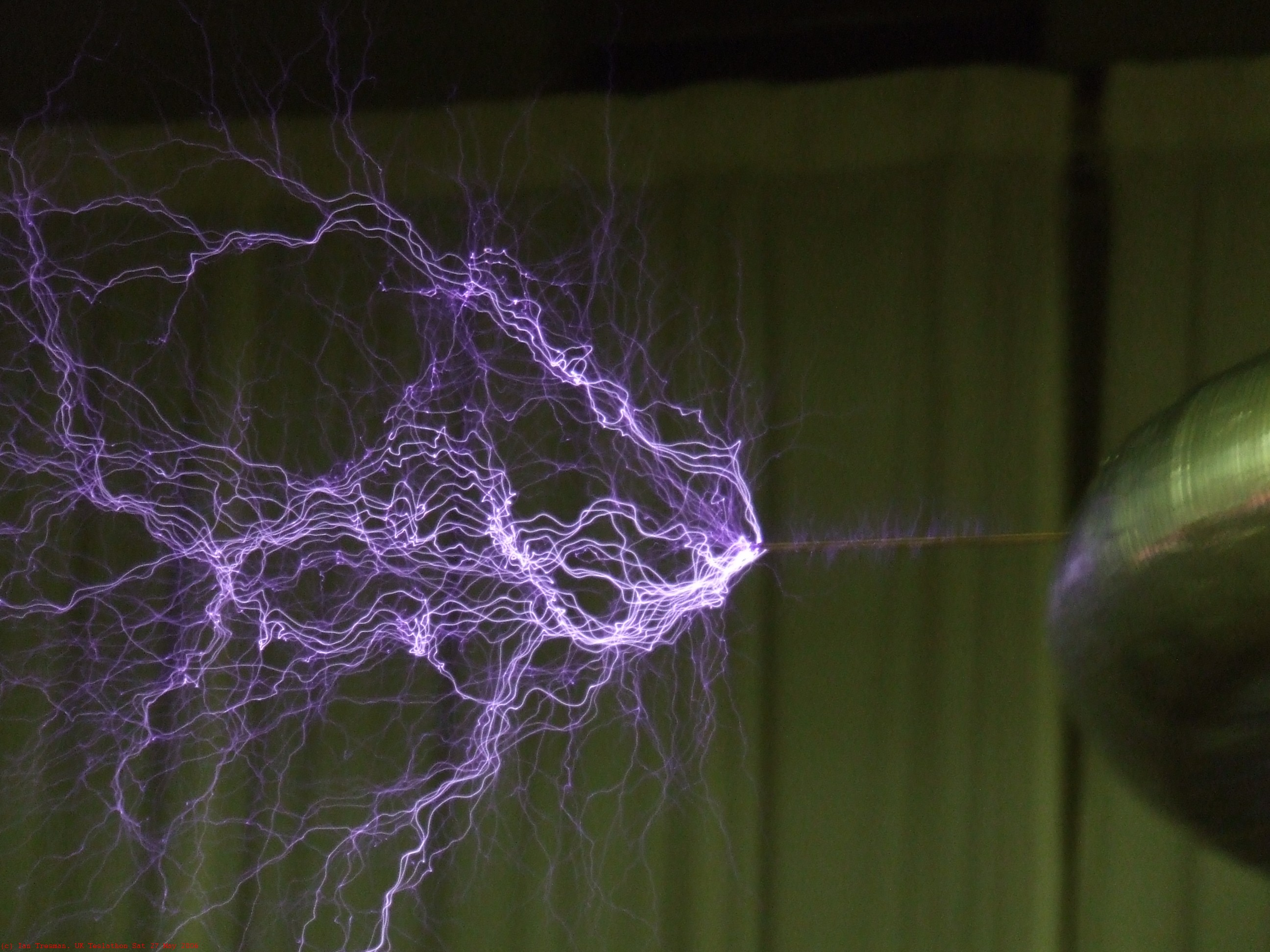
High voltages may lead to electrical breakdown, resulting in an electrical discharge as illustrated by the plasma filaments streaming from a Tesla coil.

High voltage is an electrical potential large enough to cause injury or damage. In certain industries, high voltage refers to voltage above a nominal threshold. Equipment and conductors that carry high voltage warrant special safety requirements and procedures.

High voltage is used in electrical power distribution, in cathode-ray tubes, to generate X-rays and particle beams, to produce electrical arcs, for ignition, in photomultiplier tubes, and in high-power amplifier vacuum tubes, as well as other industrial, military and scientific applications.

== Definition ==
IEC 61140 voltage bands	AC RMS	DC	Defining risk
High voltage	> 1,000	> 1,500	Electrical arcing
Low voltage	≤ 1,000	≤ 1,500	Electrical shock
Extra-low voltage	< 50	< 120	Electrical fire

The numerical definition of high voltage depends on context. Two factors considered in classifying a voltage as high voltage are the possibility of causing a spark in air, and the danger of electric shock by contact or proximity.

The International Electrotechnical Commission and its national counterparts (IET, IEEE, VDE, etc.) define high voltage as above 1000 V for alternating current, and at least 1500 V for direct current. in IEC 61140.

In the United States, the American National Standards Institute (ANSI) establishes nominal voltage ratings for 60 Hz electric power systems over 100 V. Specifically, ANSI C84.1-2020 defines high voltage as 115 kV to 230 kV, extra-high voltage as 345 kV to 765 kV, and ultra-high voltage as 1,100 kV. British Standard BS 7671:2008 defines high voltage as any voltage difference between conductors that is higher than 1000 VAC or 1500 V ripple-free DC, or any voltage difference between a conductor and Earth that is higher than 600 VAC or 900 V ripple-free DC. According to the National Electrical Code (NEC) used in buildings in the USA, voltages of up to 30 volts AC or 60 volts DC are considered low voltage, and voltages higher than these are considered high voltage.

Electricians may only be licensed for particular voltage classes in some jurisdictions. For example, an electrical license for a specialized sub-trade such as installation of HVAC systems, fire alarm systems, closed-circuit-television systems may be authorized to install systems energized up to only 30 volts between conductors, and may not be permitted to work on mains-voltage circuits. The general public may consider household mains circuits (100 to 250 VAC), which carry the highest voltages they normally encounter, to be high voltage.

Voltages over approximately 50 volts can usually cause dangerous amounts of current to flow through a human being who touches two points of a circuit, so safety standards are more restrictive around such circuits.

In automotive engineering, high voltage is defined as voltage in range 30 to 1000 VAC or 60 to 1500 VDC.

The definition of extra-high voltage (EHV) again depends on context. In electric power transmission engineering, EHV is classified as voltages in the range of 345,000– 765,000 V. In electronics systems, a power supply that provides greater than 275,000 volts is called an EHV power supply, and is often used in experiments in physics. The accelerating voltage for a television cathode ray tube may be described as extra-high voltage or extra-high tension (EHT), compared to other voltage supplies within the equipment. This type of supply ranges from 5 kV to about 30 kV. Ultra high voltage (UHV) can be defined as AC voltages of or over 1000 KV and DC voltages of or over 750 KV.

The Unicode text character representing "high voltage" is U+26A1, the symbol "⚡︎".

== Production ==
The common static electric sparks seen under low-humidity conditions always involve voltage well above 700 V. For example, sparks to car doors in winter can involve voltages as high as 20,000 V.

Electrostatic generators such as Van de Graaff generators and Wimshurst machines can produce voltages approaching one million volts at several amps, but typically don't last long enough to cause damage. Induction coils operate on the flyback effect resulting in voltages greater than the turns ratio multiplied by the input voltage. They typically produce higher currents than electrostatic machines, but each doubling of desired output voltage roughly doubles the weight due to the amount of wire required in the secondary winding. Thus scaling them to higher voltages by adding more turns of wire can become impractical. The Cockcroft–Walton multiplier can be used to multiply the voltage produced by an induction coil. It generates DC using diode switches to charge a ladder of capacitors. Tesla coils utilize resonance, are lightweight, and do not require semiconductors.

The largest scale sparks are those produced naturally by lightning. An average bolt of negative lightning carries a current of 30 to 50 kiloamperes, transfers a charge of 5 coulombs, and dissipates 500 megajoules of energy (120 kg TNT equivalent, or enough to light a 100-watt light bulb for approximately 2 months). However, an average bolt of positive lightning (from the top of a thunderstorm) may carry a current of 300 to 500 kiloamperes, transfer a charge of up to 300 coulombs, have a potential difference up to 1 gigavolt (a billion volts), and may dissipate 300 GJ of energy (72 tons TNT, or enough energy to light a 100-watt light bulb for up to 95 years). A negative lightning strike typically lasts for only tens of microseconds, but multiple strikes are common. A positive lightning strike is typically a single event, but the larger peak current may flow for hundreds of milliseconds, making it considerably more energetic than negative lightning.

== Sparks in air ==
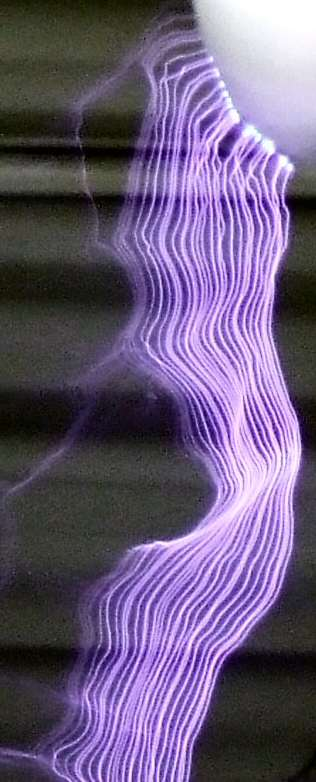
Long-exposure photograph of a Tesla coil showing the repeated electric discharges

The dielectric breakdown strength of dry air, at standard temperature and pressure (STP), between spherical electrodes is approximately 33 kV/cm. This is only a rough guide, since the actual breakdown voltage is highly dependent upon the electrode shape and size. Strong electric fields (from high voltages applied to small or pointed conductors) often produce violet-colored corona discharges in air, as well as visible sparks. Voltages below about 500–700 volts cannot produce easily visible sparks or glows in air at atmospheric pressure, so by this rule these voltages are "low". However, under conditions of low atmospheric pressure (such as in high-altitude aircraft), or in an environment of noble gas such as argon or neon, sparks appear at much lower voltages. 500 to 700 volts is not a fixed minimum for producing spark breakdown, but it is a rule-of-thumb. For air at STP, the minimum sparkover voltage is around 327 volts, as noted by Friedrich Paschen.

While lower voltages do not, in general, jump a gap that is present before the voltage is applied, interrupting an existing current flow with a gap often produces a low-voltage spark or arc. As the contacts are separated, a few small points of contact become the last to separate. The current becomes constricted to these small hot spots, causing them to become incandescent, so that they emit electrons (through thermionic emission). Even a small 9 V battery can spark noticeably by this mechanism in a darkened room. The ionized air and metal vapour (from the contacts) form plasma, which temporarily bridges the widening gap. If the power supply and load allow sufficient current to flow, a self-sustaining arc may form. Once formed, an arc may be extended to a significant length before breaking the circuit. Attempting to open an inductive circuit often forms an arc, since the inductance provides a high-voltage pulse whenever the current is interrupted. AC systems make sustained arcing somewhat less likely, since the current returns to zero twice per cycle. The arc is extinguished every time the current goes through a zero crossing, and must reignite during the next half-cycle to maintain the arc.

Unlike an ohmic conductor, the resistance of an arc decreases as the current increases. This makes unintentional arcs in an electrical apparatus dangerous since even a small arc can grow large enough to damage equipment and start fires if sufficient current is available. Intentionally produced arcs, such as used in lighting or welding, require some element in the circuit to stabilize the arc's current/voltage characteristics.

== Uses ==
=== Distribution ===
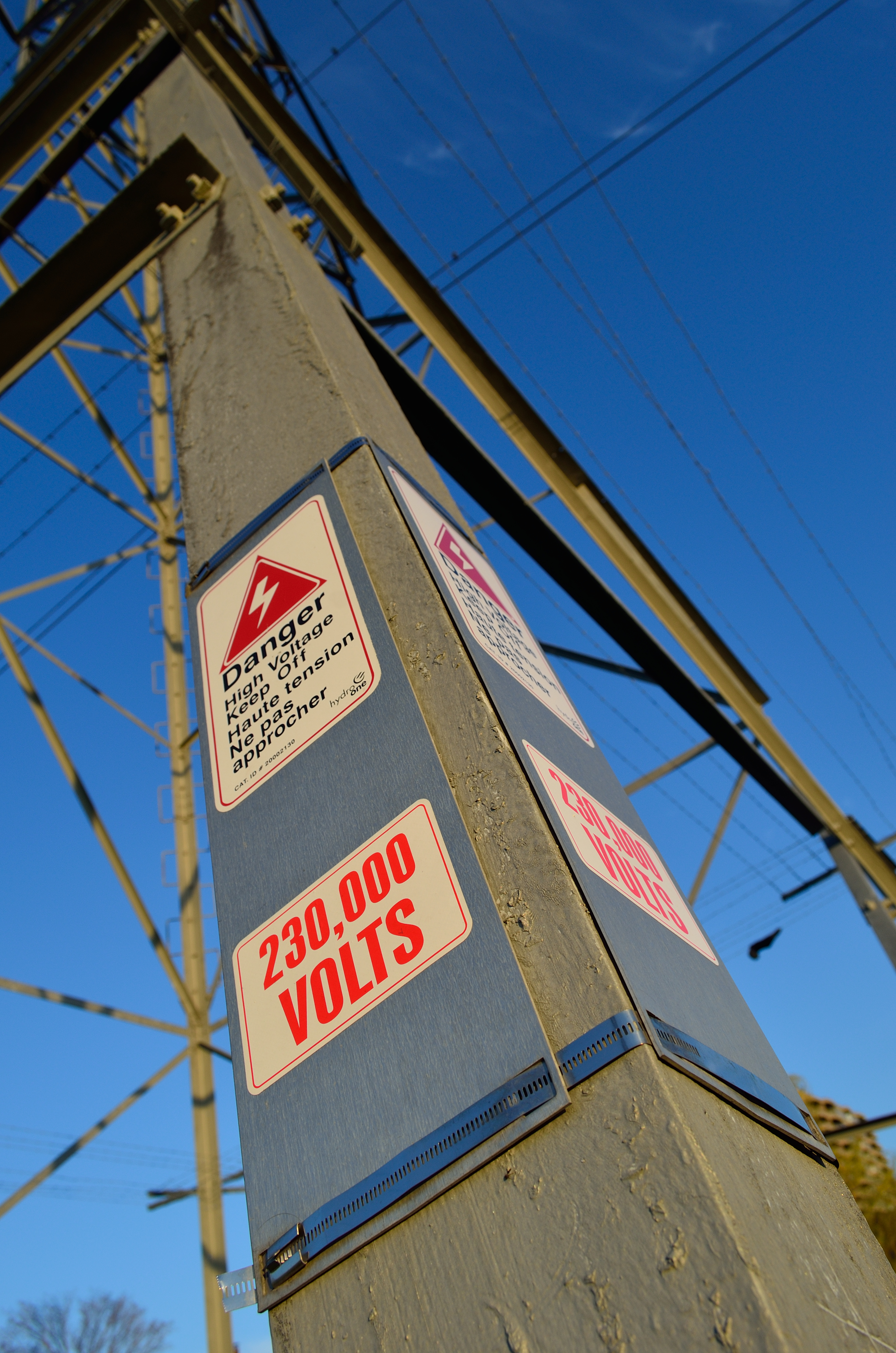
Power lines with high-voltage warning sign

Electrical transmission and distribution lines for electric power typically use voltages between tens and hundreds of kilovolts. The lines may be overhead or underground. High voltage is used in power distribution to reduce ohmic losses when transporting electricity long distance.

=== Industrial ===
It is used in the production of semiconductors to sputter thin layers of metal films on the surface of the wafer. It is also used for electrostatic flocking to coat objects with small fibers that stand on edge.

=== Scientific ===
Spark gaps were used historically as an early form of radio transmission. Similarly, lightning discharges in the atmosphere of Jupiter are thought to be the source of the planet's powerful radio frequency emissions.

High voltages have been used in landmark chemistry and particle physics experiments and discoveries. Electric arcs were used in the isolation and discovery of the element argon from atmospheric air. Induction coils powered early X-ray tubes. Moseley used an X-ray tube to determine the atomic number of a selection of metallic elements by the spectrum emitted when used as anodes. High voltage is used for generating electron beams for microscopy. Cockcroft and Walton invented the voltage multiplier to transmutate lithium atoms in lithium oxide into helium by accelerating hydrogen atoms.

== Safety ==
Electric shock hazard symbol (ISO 7010 W012), also known as high voltage symbol

Voltages greater than 50 V applied across dry unbroken human skin can cause heart fibrillation if they produce electric currents in body tissues that happen to pass through the chest area. The voltage at which there is the danger of electrocution depends on the electrical conductivity of dry human skin. Living human tissue can be protected from damage by the insulating characteristics of dry skin up to around 50 volts. If the same skin becomes wet, if there are wounds, or if the voltage is applied to electrodes that penetrate the skin, then even voltage sources below 40 V can be lethal.

Accidental contact with any high voltage supplying sufficient energy may result in severe injury or death. This can occur as a person's body provides a path for current flow, causing tissue damage and heart failure. Other injuries can include burns from the arc generated by the accidental contact. These burns can be especially dangerous if the victim's airway is affected. Injuries may also be suffered as a result of the physical forces experienced by people who fall from a great height or are thrown a considerable distance.

Low-energy exposure to high voltage may be harmless, such as the spark produced in a dry climate when touching a doorknob after walking across a carpeted floor. The voltage can be in the thousand-volt range, but the average current is low.

The standard precautions to avoid injury include working under conditions that would avoid having electrical energy flow through the body, particularly through the heart region, such as between the arms, or between an arm and a leg. Electricity can flow between two conductors in high-voltage equipment and the body can complete the circuit. To avoid that from happening, the worker should wear insulating clothing such as rubber gloves, use insulated tools, and avoid touching the equipment with more than one hand at a time. An electrical current can also flow between the equipment and the earth ground. To prevent that, the worker should stand on an insulated surface such as on rubber mats. Safety equipment is tested regularly to ensure it is still protecting the user. Test regulations vary according to country. Testing companies can test at up 300,000 volts and offer services from glove testing to elevated working platform (or EWP) testing.

=== Distribution ===
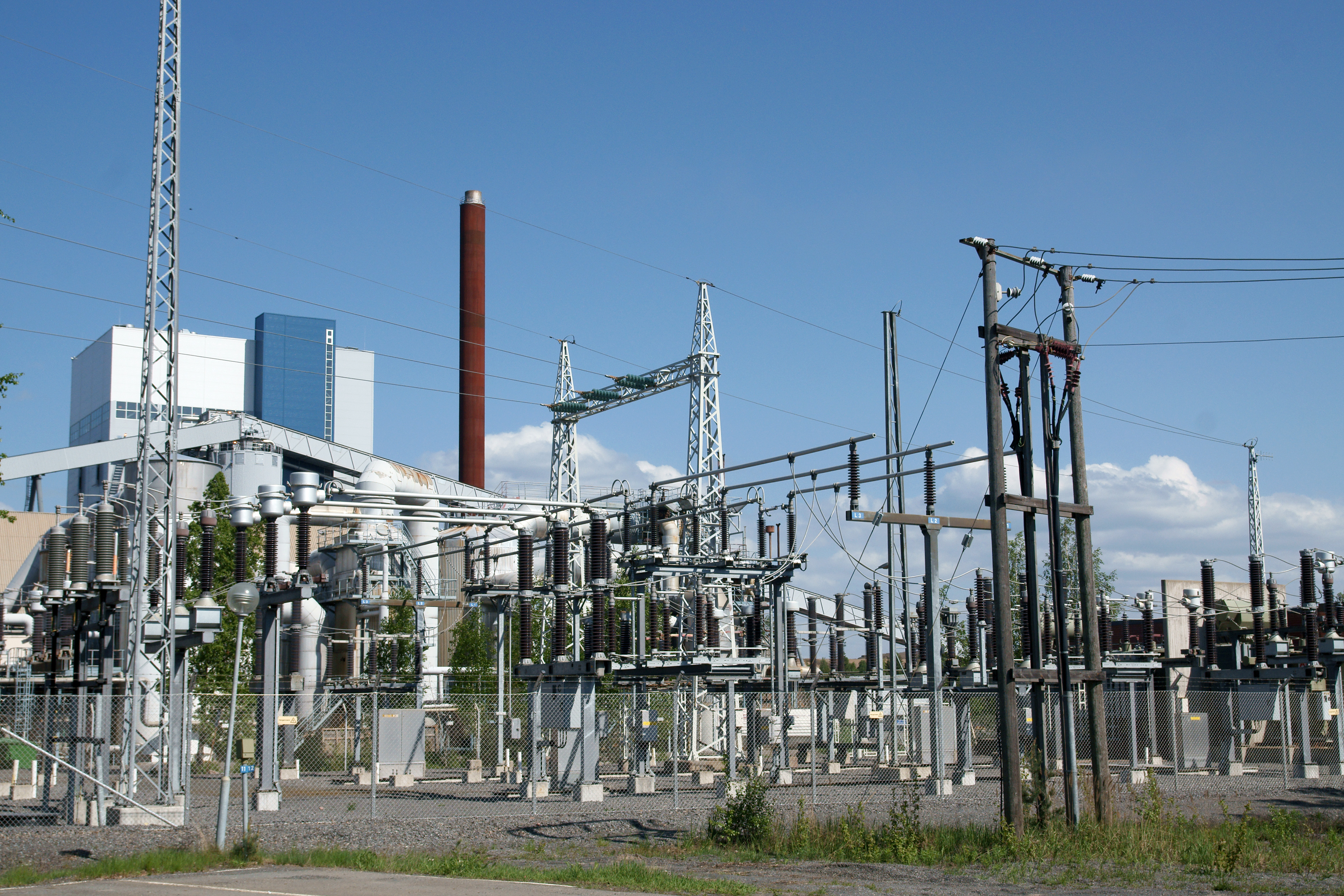
High-voltage substation in Kaanaa, Pori, Finland

Contact with or close approach to line conductors presents a danger of electrocution. Contact with overhead wires can result in injury or death. Metal ladders, farm equipment, boat masts, construction machinery, aerial antennas, and similar objects are frequently involved in fatal contact with overhead wires. Unauthorized persons climbing on power pylons or electrical apparatus are also frequently the victims of electrocution. At very high transmission voltages even a close approach can be hazardous, since the high voltage may arc across a significant air gap.

Digging into a buried cable can also be dangerous to workers at an excavation site. Digging equipment (either hand tools or machine driven) that contacts a buried cable may energize piping or the ground in the area, resulting in electrocution of nearby workers. A fault in a high-voltage transmission line or substation may result in high currents flowing along the surface of the earth, producing an earth potential rise that also presents a danger of electric shock.

For high-voltage and extra-high-voltage transmission lines, specially trained personnel use "live line" techniques to allow hands-on contact with energized equipment. In this case the worker is electrically connected to the high-voltage line but thoroughly insulated from the earth so that he is at the same electrical potential as that of the line. Since training for such operations is lengthy, and still presents a danger to personnel, only very important transmission lines are subject to maintenance while live. Outside these properly engineered situations, insulation from earth does not guarantee that no current flows to earth—as grounding or arcing to ground can occur in unexpected ways, and high-frequency currents can burn even an ungrounded person. Touching a transmitting antenna is dangerous for this reason, and a high-frequency Tesla coil can sustain a spark with only one endpoint.

Protective equipment on high-voltage transmission lines normally prevents formation of an unwanted arc, or ensures that it is quenched within tens of milliseconds. Electrical apparatus that interrupts high-voltage circuits is designed to safely direct the resulting arc so that it dissipates without damage. High-voltage circuit breaker often use a blast of high pressure air, a special dielectric gas (such as SF_{6} under pressure), or immersion in mineral oil to quench the arc when the high-voltage circuit is broken.

Wiring in equipment such as X-ray machines and lasers requires care. The high-voltage section is kept physically distant from the low-voltage side to reduce the possibility of an arc forming between the two. To avoid coronal losses, conductors are kept as short as possible and free of sharp points. If insulated, the plastic coating should be free of air bubbles which result in coronal discharges within the bubbles.

=== Electrostatic generators ===
A high voltage is not necessarily dangerous if it cannot deliver substantial current. Despite electrostatic machines such as Van de Graaff generators and Wimshurst machines producing voltages approaching one million volts, they deliver a brief sting. That is because the current is low, i.e. only a relatively few electrons move. These devices have a limited amount of stored energy, so the average current produced is low and usually for a short time, with impulses peaking in the 1 A range for a nanosecond.

The discharge may involve extremely high voltage over very short periods, but to produce heart fibrillation, an electric power supply must produce a significant current in the heart muscle continuing for many milliseconds, and must deposit a total energy in the range of at least millijoules or higher. Relatively high current at anything more than about fifty volts can therefore be medically significant and potentially fatal.

During the discharge, these machines apply high voltage to the body for only a millionth of a second or less. So a low current is applied for a very short time, and the number of electrons involved is very small.

=== Tesla coils ===
Despite Tesla coils superficially appearing similar to Van de Graaff generators, they are not electrostatic machines and can produce significant radio frequency currents continuously. The current supplied to a human body will be relatively constant as long as contact is maintained, unlike with electrostatic machines which generally take longer to build up charges, and the voltage will be much higher than the break-down voltage of human skin. As a consequence, the output of a Tesla coil can be dangerous or even fatal.

=== Arc flash hazard ===
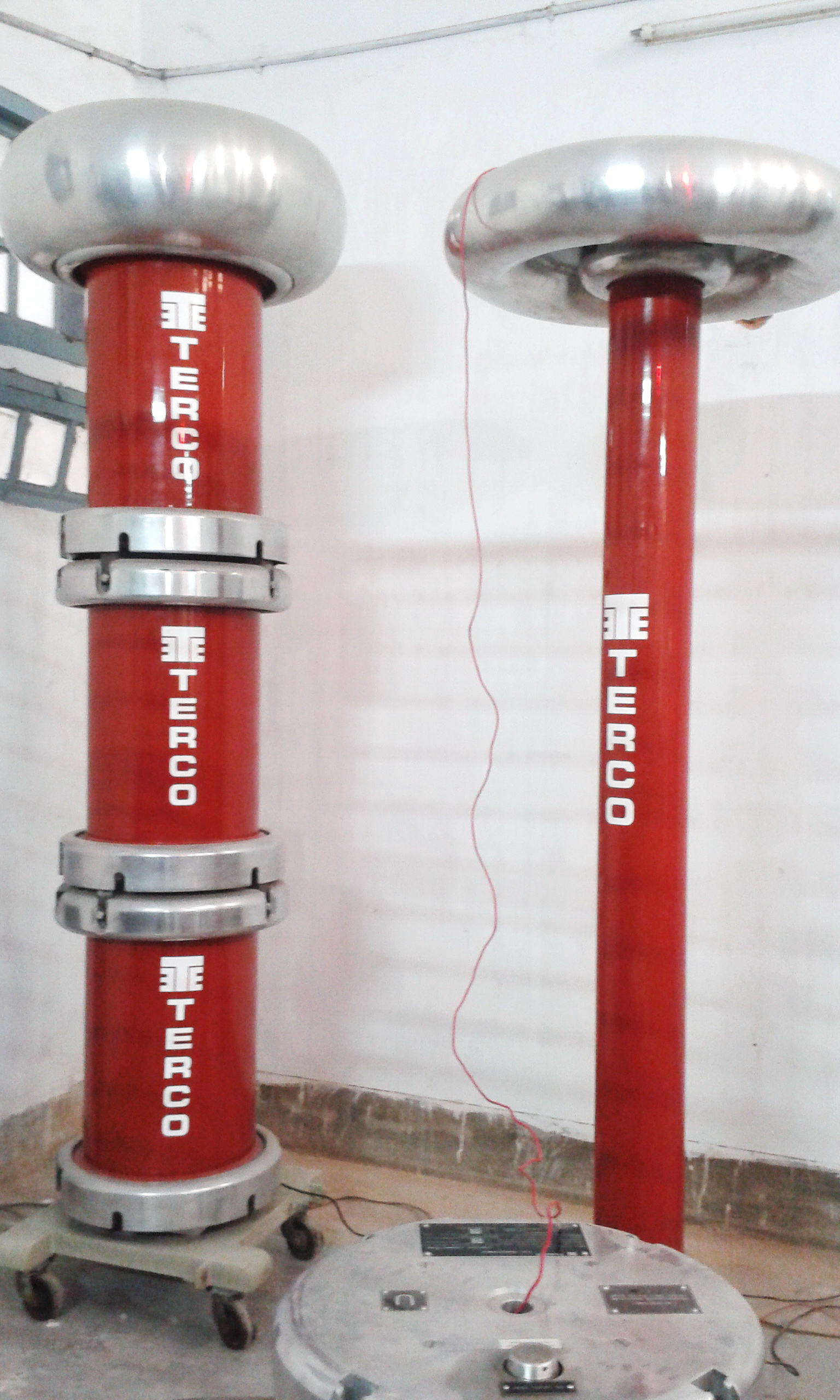
High-voltage testing arrangement with large capacitor and test transformer

Depending on the prospective short-circuit current available at a switchgear line-up, a hazard is presented to maintenance and operating personnel due to the possibility of a high-intensity electric arc. Maximum temperature of an arc can exceed 10,000 kelvins, and the radiant heat, expanding hot air, and explosive vaporization of metal and insulation material can cause severe injury to unprotected workers. Such switchgear line-ups and high-energy arc sources are commonly present in electric power utility substations and generating stations, industrial plants and large commercial buildings. In the United States, the National Fire Protection Association has published a guideline standard NFPA 70E for evaluating and calculating arc flash hazard, and provides standards for the protective clothing required for electrical workers exposed to such hazards in the workplace.

=== Explosion hazard ===
Even voltages insufficient to break down air can supply enough energy to ignite atmospheres containing flammable gases or vapours, or suspended dust. For example, hydrogen gas, natural gas, or petrol/gasoline vapor mixed with air can be ignited by sparks produced by electrical apparatus. Examples of industrial facilities with hazardous areas are petrochemical refineries, chemical plants, grain elevators, and coal mines.

Measures taken to prevent such explosions include:

- Intrinsic safety by the use of apparatus designed not to accumulate enough stored electrical energy to trigger an explosion
- Increased safety, which applies to devices using measures such as oil-filled enclosures to prevent sparks
- Explosion-proof (flame-proof) enclosures, which are designed so that an explosion within the enclosure cannot escape and ignite a surrounding explosive atmosphere (this designation does not imply that the apparatus can survive an internal or external explosion)

In recent years, standards for explosion hazard protection have become more uniform between European and North American practice. The "zone" system of classification is now used in modified form in U.S. National Electrical Code and in the Canadian Electrical Code. Intrinsic safety apparatus is now approved for use in North American applications.

=== Toxic gases ===
Electrical discharges, including partial discharge and corona, can produce small quantities of toxic gases, which in a confined space can be a health hazard. These gases include oxidizers such as ozone and various oxides of nitrogen. They are readily identified by their characteristic odor or color, and thus contact time can be minimized. Nitric oxide is invisible but has a sweet odor. It oxidizes to nitrogen dioxide within a few minutes, which has a yellow or reddish-brown color depending on concentration and smells of chlorine gas like a swimming pool. Ozone is invisible but has a pungent smell like that of the air after a lightning storm. It is a short-lived species and half of it breaks down into O_{2} within a day at normal temperatures and atmospheric pressure.

=== Lightning ===
Hazards due to lightning include direct strikes on persons or property. However, lightning can also create dangerous voltage gradients in the earth, as well as an electromagnetic pulse, and can charge extended metal objects such as telephone cables, fences, and pipelines to dangerous voltages that can be carried many miles from the site of the strike. Although many of these objects are not normally conductive, very high voltage can cause the electrical breakdown of such insulators, causing them to act as conductors. These transferred potentials are dangerous to people, livestock, and electronic apparatus. Lightning strikes also start fires and explosions, which result in fatalities, injuries, and property damage. For example, each year in North America, thousands of forest fires are started by lightning strikes.

Measures to control lightning can mitigate the hazard; these include lightning rods, shielding wires, and bonding of electrical and structural parts of buildings to form a continuous enclosure.

== See also ==
- Voltage transformer
- Charging station
- Electrical engineering
- Electric power transmission (includes a 'Health concerns' section)
- High-voltage direct current
- Low voltage
- Orders of magnitude (voltage)
- Tesla coil
- Spark gap
