= Low voltage =

Low amounts of electrical volts

In electrical engineering, low voltage is a relative term, the definition varying by context. Different definitions are used in electric power transmission and distribution, compared with electronics design. Electrical safety codes define "low voltage" circuits that are exempt from the protection required at higher voltages. These definitions vary by country and specific codes or regulations.

== IEC Definition ==
IEC 61140 voltage bands	AC RMS	DC	Defining risk
High voltage	> 1,000	> 1,500	Electrical arcing
Low voltage	≤ 1,000	≤ 1,500	Electrical shock
Extra-low voltage	< 50	< 120	Electrical fire

The International Electrotechnical Commission (IEC) standard IEC 61140:2016, concerning protection against electric shock, defines the low voltage (LV) band as ≤ 1000 V AC RMS or ≤ 1500 V DC. This incorporates the Extra-low voltage band.

In electrical power systems low voltage most commonly refers to the mains voltages as used by domestic and light industrial and commercial consumers. "Low voltage" in this context still presents a risk of electric shock, but only a minor risk of electric arcs through the air.

== United Kingdom ==
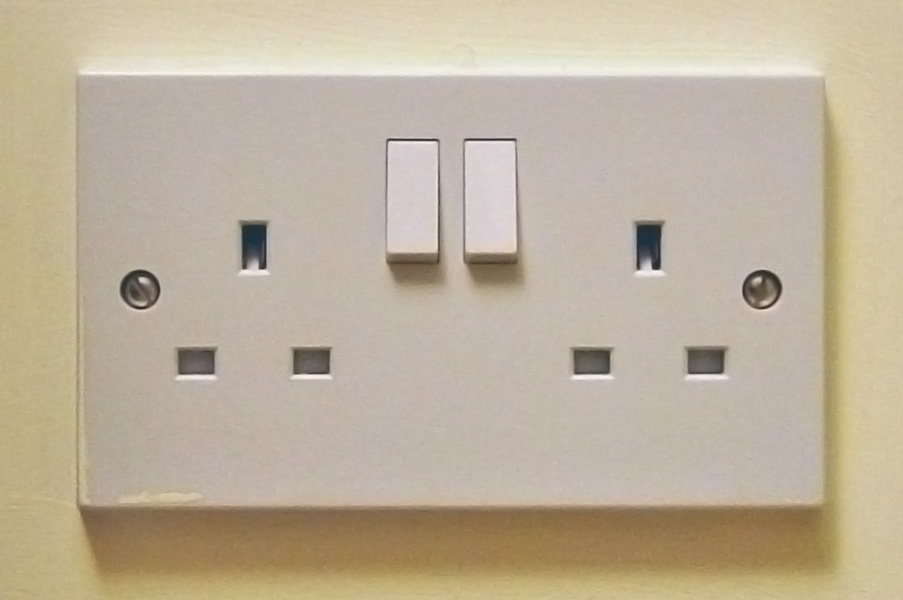
UK low voltage AC socket

British Standard BS 7671, Requirements for Electrical Installations. IET Wiring Regulations, defines supply system low voltage as:

exceeding 50 V AC or 120 V ripple-free DC. but not exceeding 1000 V AC or 1500 V DC between conductors, or 600 V AC or 900 V DC between conductors and earth.

The ripple-free direct current requirement only applies to 120 V DC, not to any DC voltage above that. For example, a direct current that is exceeding 1500 V during voltage fluctuations is not categorized as low-voltage.

== United States ==
In electrical power distribution, the US National Electrical Code (NEC), NFPA 70, article 725 (2005), defines low distribution system voltage (LDSV) as up to 49 V.

The NFPA standard 79 article 6.4.1.1 defines distribution protected extra-low voltage (PELV) as nominal voltage of 30 Vrms or 60 V DC ripple-free for dry locations, and 6 Vrms or 15 V DC in all other cases.

Standard NFPA 70E, Article 130, 2021 Edition, omits energized electrical conductors and circuit parts operating at less than 50 V from its safety requirements of work involving electrical hazards when an electrically safe work condition cannot be established.

UL standard 508A, article 43 (table 43.1) defines 0 to 20 V peak / 5 A or 20.1 to 42.4 V peak / 100 VA as low-voltage limited energy (LVLE) circuits.

== European Union ==
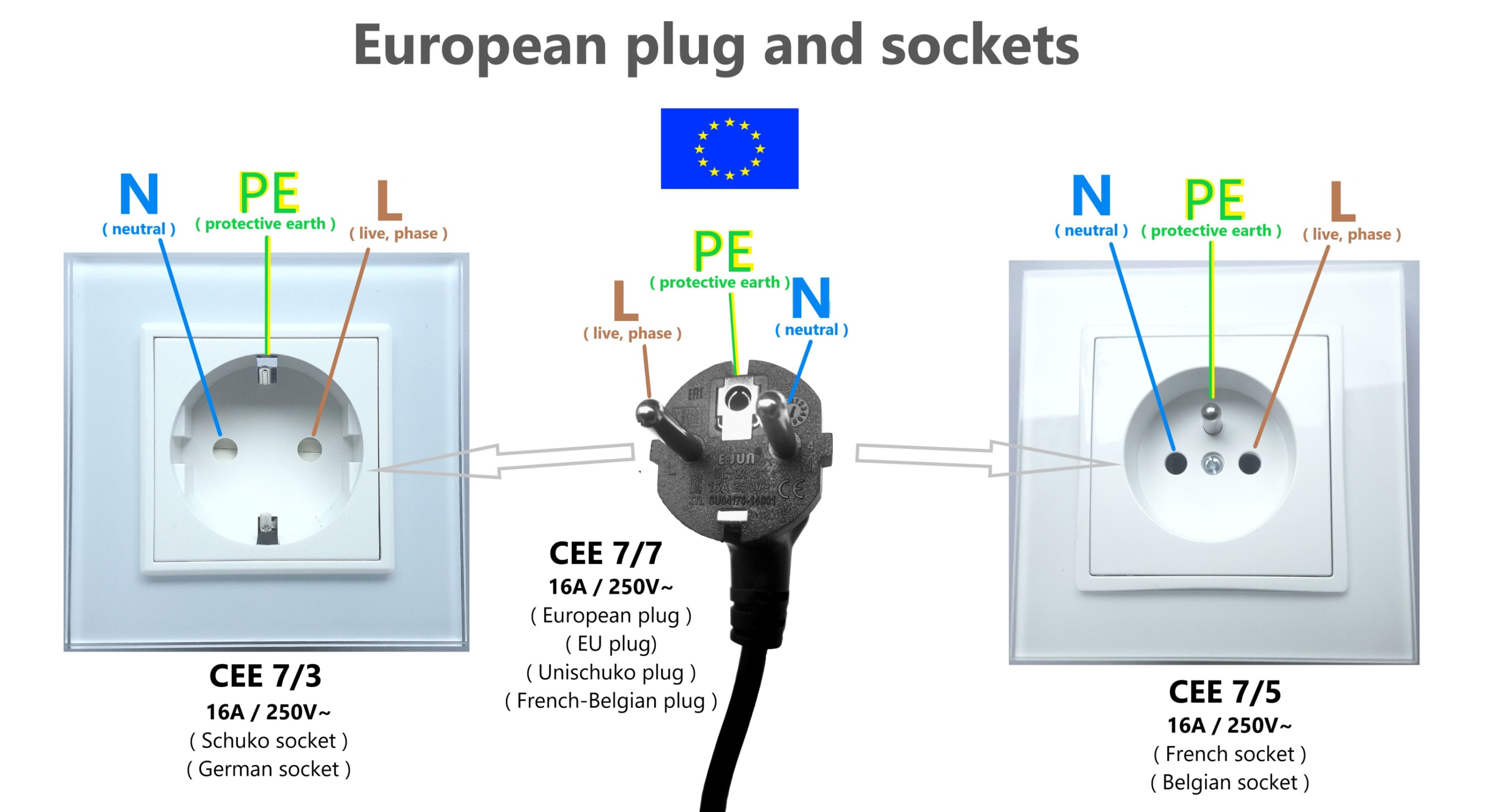
European low voltage AC electrical plug and sockets

The low voltage directive (LVD) (2014/35/EU) defines low voltage for electrical equipment as devices operating within the range between 50 V AC to 1000 V AC or 75 V DC to 1500 V DC. These ratings are for the inputs and outputs of the device, not internal voltages.

== Australia ==
Safe Work Australia and Energy Networks Australia defines low voltage as a nominal voltage between 50 V AC and 1000 V AC or a ripple free DC voltage between 120V DC and 1500 V DC. Anything below the minimum values of the low voltage range is considered extra low voltage.

== South Africa ==
In "Electricity Supply By-law, 2023" low voltage is defined as nominal voltage levels less than 1000 V AC or 1500 V DC that are used for distribution.

== Canada ==
The Canadian Electrical Code defines low voltage as ranging from 31 V to 750 V.

== See also ==
- High voltage
- Low Voltage Directive
