= IEC 60364 =

International standard on electrical installations of buildings

IEC 60364 Low-voltage electrical installations is the International Electrotechnical Commission (IEC)'s international standard series on low-voltage electrical installations. This standard is an attempt to harmonize national wiring standards in an IEC standard and is published in the European Union by CENELEC as "HD 60364". The latest versions of many European wiring regulations (e.g., BS 7671 in the UK) follow the section structure of IEC 60364 very closely, but contain additional language to cater for historic national practice and to simplify field use and determination of compliance by electricians and inspectors. National codes and site guides are meant to attain the common objectives of IEC 60364, and provide rules in a form that allows for guidance of persons installing and inspecting electrical systems.

The standard has several parts:

- Part 1: Fundamental principles, assessment of general characteristics, definitions
- Part 4: Protection for safety
  - Section 41: Protection against electric shock
  - Section 42: Protection against thermal effects
  - Section 43: Protection against overcurrent
  - Section 44: Protection against voltage disturbances and electromagnetic disturbances
- Part 5: Selection and erection of electrical equipment
  - Section 51: Common rules
  - Section 52: Wiring systems
  - Section 53: Devices for protection for safety, isolation, switching, control and monitoring
  - Section 54: Earthing arrangements and protective conductors
  - Section 55: Other equipment (Note: Some national standards provide an individual document for each chapter of this section, i.e. 551 Low-voltage generating sets, 557 Auxiliary circuits, 559 Luminaires and lighting installations)
  - Section 56: Safety services
  - Section 57: Erection of stationary secondary batteries
- Part 6: Verification
- Part 7: Requirements for special installations or locations
  - Section 701: Electrical installations in bathrooms
  - Section 702: Swimming pools and other basins
  - Section 703: Rooms and cabins containing sauna heaters
  - Section 704: Construction and demolition site installations
  - Section 705: Electrical installations of agricultural and horticultural premises
  - Section 706: Restrictive conductive locations
  - Section 708: Electrical installations in caravan parks and caravans
  - Section 709: Marinas and pleasure craft
  - Section 710: Medical locations
  - Section 711: Exhibitions, shows and stands
  - Section 712: Solar photovoltaic (PV) power supply systems
  - Section 713: Furniture
  - Section 714: External lighting
  - Section 715: Extra-low-voltage lighting installations
  - Section 717: Mobile or transportable units
  - Section 718: Communal facilities and workplaces
  - Section 721: Electrical installations in caravans and motor caravans
  - Section 722: Supplies for Electric Vehicles
  - Section 729: Operating or maintenance gangways
  - Section 740: Temporary electrical installations for structures, amusement devices and booths at fairgrounds, amusement parks and circuses
  - Section 753: Heating cables and embedded heating systems
- Part 8: Functional Aspects
  - Section 8-1: Energy Efficiency
  - Section 8-82: Prosumer’s low-voltage electrical installations
  - Section 8-3: Operation of prosumer’s electrical installations

== See also ==
- Electrical wiring
- Earthing systems
- BS 7671
- AS/NZS 3000
