= Electrical safety standards =

Standards and procedures intended to protect from the damaging effects of electricity

Electrical safety is a system of organizational measures and technical means to prevent harmful and dangerous effects on workers from electric current, arcing, electromagnetic fields and static electricity.

== History ==
The electrical safety develops with the technical progress. In 1989 OSHA promulgated a much-needed regulation in the General Industry Regulations. Several standards are defined for control of hazardous energy, or lockout/tagout. In 1995 OSHA was successful in promulgation of regulations for utility. In 1994 were established Electrical Safety Foundation International non-profit organization dedicated exclusively to promoting electrical safety at home and in the workplace.

- Standard 29 CFR 1910.269 – for electric power generation, transmission, and distribution, contained comprehensive regulations and addressed control of hazardous energy sources for power plant locations

Standards are compared with those of IEEE and National Fire Protection Association.

== Lightning and earthing protection ==
Lightning and Earthing protection systems are essential for the protection of humans, structures, protecting buildings from mechanical destruction caused by lightning effects and the associated risk of fire, Transmission lines, and electrical equipment from electric shock and Overcurrent.

=== Earthing protection systems ===
TT earthing system

- TT system
- TN system
- IT system

=== Lightning protection systems ===
- lightning rod (simple rod or with triggering system)
- lightning rod with taut wires.
- lightning conductor with meshed cage (Faraday cage)

== Physiological effects of electricity ==
Electrical shocks on humans can lead to permanent disabilities or death. Size, frequency and duration of the electrical current affect the damage. The effects from electric shock can be: stopping the heart beating properly, preventing the person from breathing, causing muscle spasms. The skin features also affect the consequences of electric shock.

Electric shock graph

- Indirect contact – can be avoided by automatic disconnection for TT system, automatic disconnection for TN systems, automatic disconnection on a second fault in an IT system, measures of protection against direct or indirect contact without automatic disconnection of supply
- Direct contact – can be avoided by protection by the insulation of live parts, protection by means of barriers or enclosures, partial measures of protection, particular measures of protection

== Electrical safety conductors ==
- United States – NEC 2008 Table 250.122 – Safeco Electric Supply

== Electrical safety standards ==
- Australia – Australian Standards AS/NZS 3000:2007, AS/NZS 3012:2010, AS/NZS 3017:2007, AS/NZS 3760:2010, AS/NZS 4836:2011
- Brazil – National Regulation – NR10
- Bulgaria – Български Държавен Стандарт – (On English:Bulgarian state standard) – БДС 12.2.096:1986
- China – GB4943, GB17625, GB9254
- France – La norme français C 15-100 – Aspects de la norme d’installation électrique
- Germany – IEEE/TÜV, NSR Niederspannungsrichtlinie 2014/35/EU
- India – India Standardization IS-5216, IS-5571, IS-6665
- Netherlands – NEN 1010
- Poland – Polska Norma PN-EN 61010-2-201:2013-12E
- Russia – ГОСТ 12.2.007.0-75,ГОСТ Р МЭК 61140-2000,ГОСТ 12.2.007.0-75,ГОСТ Р 52726-2007
- United Kingdom – British standards BS 7671, BS EN 61439, BS 5266, BS 5839, BS 6423, BS 6626, BS EN 62305, BS EN 60529
- United States – OSHA, NFPA 70, NFPA 70E

== Lightning protection standards ==
- Bulgaria – БДС EN 62305-1:2011
- China – GB/T 36490–2018
- Spain – UNE 21186. Protección contra el rayo
- France – Norme NF C 15–100
- Germany – DIN EN 62305–1
- India – IS 2309
- Indonesia – SNI 03–7015–2004
- Poland – PN-EN 62305
- Russia – СТО 083-004-2010,ГОСТ Р МЭК 62561.2-2014
- United Kingdom – BS-EN 62305
- United States – NFPA 780, IEC 62305

== Electronics and communications ==
=== Electronic products safety standards ===
The manufacturers of electronic tools must take into account several standard for electronic safety to protect the health of humans and animals.

- Argentina – CNC-St2-44.01 V02.1.1
- Europe – CE Marking
- Israel – MET MOC 023/96
- Japan – PSE law
- Mexico – NOM-152
- United States – ANSI C95.3:1972 – Techniques & instrumentation for measurement of potentially hazardous electromagnetic radiation at microwave frequencies.

=== Communication and high frequency safety standards ===
Few standard were introduced for the harmful impact from high frequency.

- Canada – CB-02 Radio Equipment
- Russia – ГОСТ Р 50829-95 for radio Communication safety
- United States – ANSI/IEEE 1.2 mW/Cm for antennas 1800-2000 MHz range, ANSI/IEEE C95.1-1992 for radio Communication safety
- Mobile Communication safety 73/23/EEC and 91/263/EEC

== See also ==
- Extra-low voltage
- Electrical safety testing

== Gallery ==
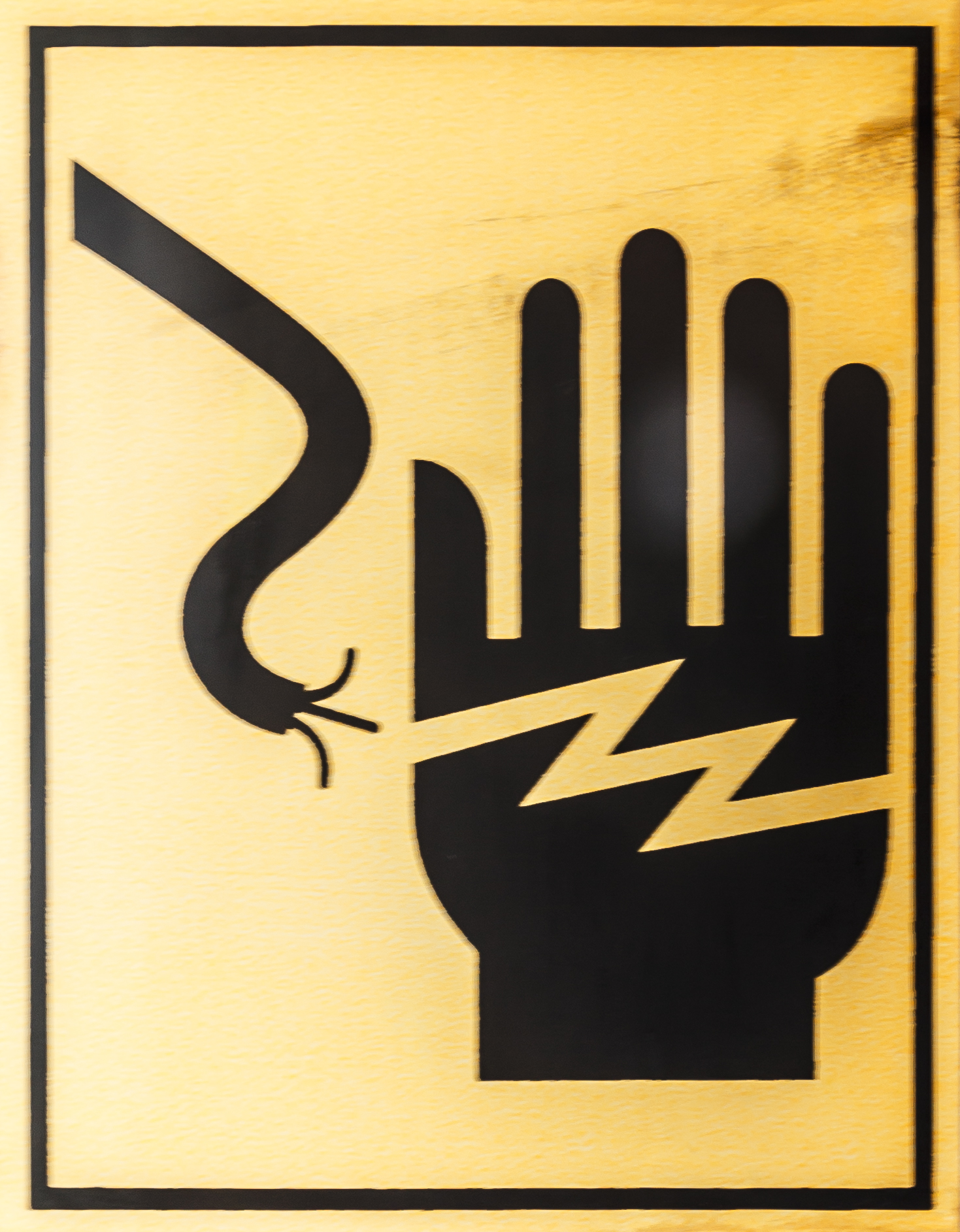
Danger symbol

Principle Protection separation

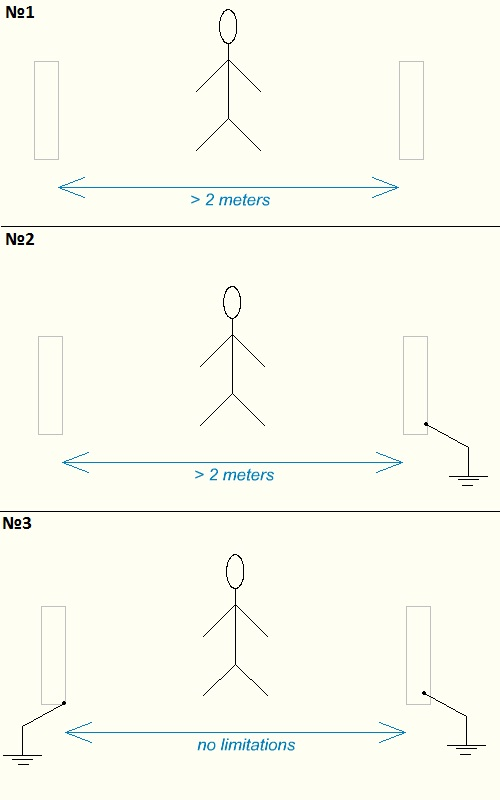
Safe distances earthing

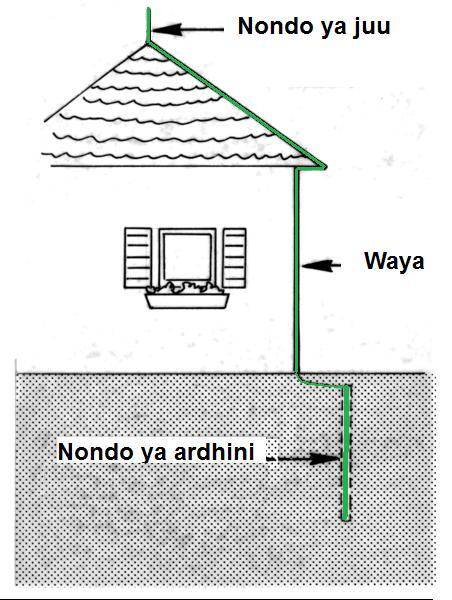
Lightning rod

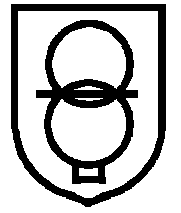
Extra low voltage symbol

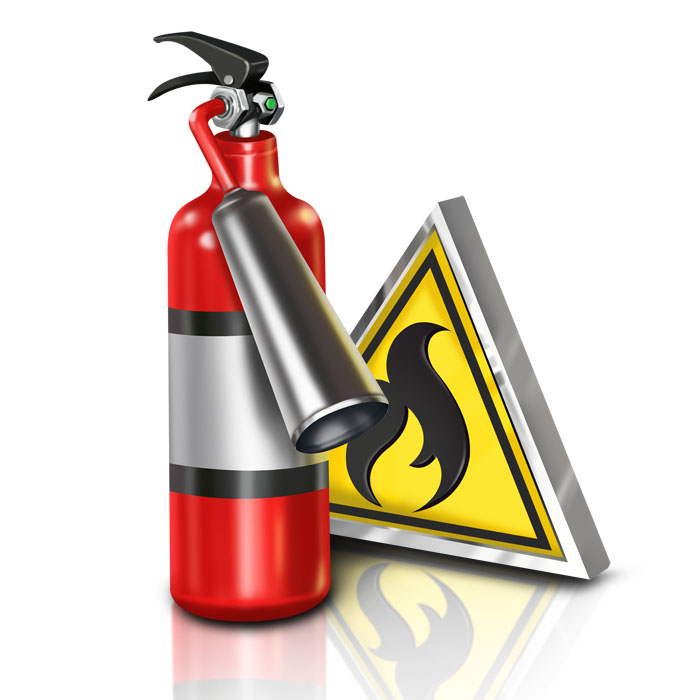
Fire protection symbol

ISO 7010 pictogram for electrical hazards.
