= Chicago Electrical Trauma Rehabilitation Institute =

Medical research program founded in 2009

Coordinates: 41.819123°N 87.725883°W

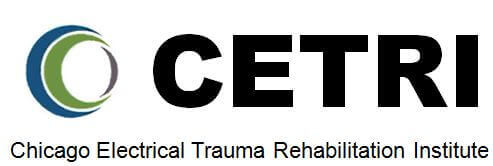
- Industry: Electrical injury medicine; Medical research; Physical medicine and rehabilitation; Trauma medicine
- Founded: 2009 in Chicago, Illinois, United States
- Headquarters: 4047 W 40th St, Chicago, Illinois 60632
- Services: Clinical evaluation of electrical injury patients; Electrical injury rehabilitation consultation; Interdisciplinary medical assessments; Neurological and functional outcome analysis; Patient advocacy and care coordination
- Website: https://cetri.org/

The Chicago Electrical Trauma Rehabilitation Institute (CETRI) was founded in Chicago, Illinois, United States, in 2009, by a team of scientists and physicians for the purpose of finding more effective medical intervention strategies to increase neuromuscular, neurosensory and neuropsychological function recovery in electrical and lightning injury survivors.

The CETRI team consists of faculty associated with the five university-based medical centers in Illinois that have been collaborating for more than three decades. Although the rates of higher-energy workplace electrical shocks are declining, it still remains a significant public health challenge with manifestations that are not fully understood and may limit clinical recovery. The precise link between these post-electrical shock syndromes has long been a subject of considerable dialogue amongst medical scientists, in part because there does not exist a proportional or clear anatomical relationship between the electrical shock magnitude and the disabling consequences. Adding to research challenges to understand electrical shock injury is that many patients recover from electrical shock injuries with much fewer clinical problems than others. Thus, understanding the all risk factors and evidence-based treatment methods is important as well. Accomplishing this is CETRI's mission. By driving innovation, education, and clinical integration in this under-researched field, CETRI continues to shape and elevate the standard of care for electrical injury survivors around the world.

== Mission and history ==
CETRI's mission is to improve recovery of individuals affected by electric injury while simultaneously advancing the understanding of tissue injury patterns associated with electric shock injuries. Its scientists and clinicians evaluate electrical shock survivors, then communicate with the medical providers in the patients community to optimize rehabilitation. Electrical shock injury is a complex multi-physical trauma that results in a range of clinical manifestations that differ from patient to patient. The explanation for this is one of CETRI's priority research focus areas. CETRI's research is funded by both federal and private research agencies, as well as public foundations. CETRI's publications have been referenced by the medical and scientific communities, as well as in trade magazines.

Some discoveries made by this team are that electrical shock injury is mediated by multiple mechanisms including non-thermal electrical forces. Many electrical shock survivors develop neuropsychological problems even if the current never passed through the brain and progressive peripheral pain and sleeplessness often adds to the disability. However, not all electrical injury survivors develop these complications, making the identification of predisposing risk factors a key objective of CETRI's research.

== Multi-specialty medical support ==
Patients evaluated at CETRI are survivors of electrical injuries who experience persistent or refractory neuromuscular, sensory, or neuropsychological impairments. While CETRI is based in Chicago, the majority of patients travel from across the United States to receive specialized care. Treatment typically spans one week, during which patients undergo comprehensive evaluations by a multidisciplinary team. Following this evaluation, CETRI provides the patient's local healthcare providers with detailed recommendations, enabling ongoing care to be continued conveniently near the patient's home.

== Publications ==
- Bier M, Chen W, Bodnar E, Lee RC. Biophysical injury mechanisms associated with lightning injury. NeuroRehabilitation. 2005;20(1):53-62.
- Cela CJ, Loizos K, Hamilton D, Lee RC, Lazzi G. On the modeling of electrical effects experienced by space explorers during extra vehicular activities: intracorporal currents, resistances, and electric fields. IEEE Trans Biomed Eng. 2011;PP(99).
- Chico MS, Capelli-Schellpfeffer M, Kelley KM, Lee RC. Management and coordination of postacute medical care for electrical trauma survivors. Ann N Y Acad Sci. 1999;888:334-342. doi:10.1111/j.1749-6632.1999.tb07968.x
- Dorociak KE, Soble JR, Rupert PA, et al. Pain Influences Neuropsychological Performance Following Electrical Injury: A Cross-Sectional Study. Journal of the International Neuropsychological Society. 2023;29(1):35-45. doi:10.1017/S1355617721001478
- Electrical Trauma: The Pathophysiology, Manifestations, and Clinical Management. Lee, R.C., Burke, J.F. and Cravalho, E.G., Eds., Cambridge University Press, 1992. ISBN 978-0-511-66329-1
- Electrical Injury: A Multidisciplinary Approach to Prevention, Therapy & Rehabilitation. Lee, R.C., Capelli-Schellpfeffer, M., and Kelley, K.M., Eds., New York Acad. of Science., Vol. 720, 1994. ISBN 978-0-89766-864-4.
- Gangidi S, Govande M, McCollum K, Lee RC. Electrical shock injuries: an analysis of voltage, frequency, and contact mode determinants. Front Disaster Emerg Med. 2024;2:1477987. doi:10.3389/femer.2024.1477987
- Gaylor DC, Prakah-Asante K, Lee RC. Significance of cell size and tissue structure in electrical trauma. J Theor Biol. 1988;133(2):223-237. doi:10.1016/s0022-5193(88)80007-9
- Gowrishankar TR, Chen W, Lee RC. Non-linear microscale alterations in membrane transport by electropermeabilization. Ann N Y Acad Sci. 1998;858:205-216. doi:10.1111/j.1749-6632.1998.tb10154.x
- Greenebaum B, Blossfield K, Hannig J, et al. Poloxamer 188 prevents acute necrosis of adult skeletal muscle cells following high-dose irradiation. Burns. 2004;30(6):539-547. doi: 10.1016/j.burns.2004.02.009
- Hamilton DR. Electrical Shock Hazard Severity Estimation During Extravehicular Activity for the International Space Station. Aerosp Med Hum Perform. 2021;92(4):231-239. doi:10.3357/AMHP.5702.2021
- Kelley KM, Tkachenko TA, Pliskin NH, Fink JW, Lee RC. Life after electrical injury. Risk factors for psychiatric sequelae. Ann N Y Acad Sci. 1999;888:356-363. doi:10.1111/j.1749-6632.1999.tb07970.x
- Lee RC, Astumian RD. The physicochemical basis for thermal and non-thermal 'burn' injuries. Burns. 1996;22(7):509-519. doi:10.1016/0305-4179(96)00051-4
- Lee RC, Canaday DJ, Hammer SM. Transient and stable ionic permeabilization of isolated skeletal muscle cells after electrical shock. J Burn Care Rehabil. 1993;14(5):528-540. doi:10.1097/00004630-199309000-00007
- Lee RC, Zhang D, Hannig J. Biophysical injury mechanisms in electrical shock trauma. Annu Rev Biomed Eng. 2000;2:477-509. doi:10.1146/annurev.bioeng.2.1.477
- Occupational Electrical Injury and Safety. Chen, C.-T., Lee, R.C., Shih, J.-X., and Zhong, M.-H. Eds., Annals of the New York Acad. of Science, Vol. 888, 1999. ISBN 978-1-57331-232-5.
- PLISKIN NH, AMMAR AN, FINK JW, et al. Neuropsychological changes following electrical injury. Journal of the International Neuropsychological Society. 2006;12(1):17-23. doi:10.1017/S1355617706060061
- Ramati A, Rubin LH, Wicklund A, et al. Psychiatric morbidity following electrical injury and its effects on cognitive functioning. Gen Hosp Psychiatry. 2009;31(4):360-366. doi:10.1016/j.genhosppsych.2009.03.010

== See also ==
- Electrical shock
- Electrocution
