= Extra-low voltage =

Electrical standard designed to protect against electric shock

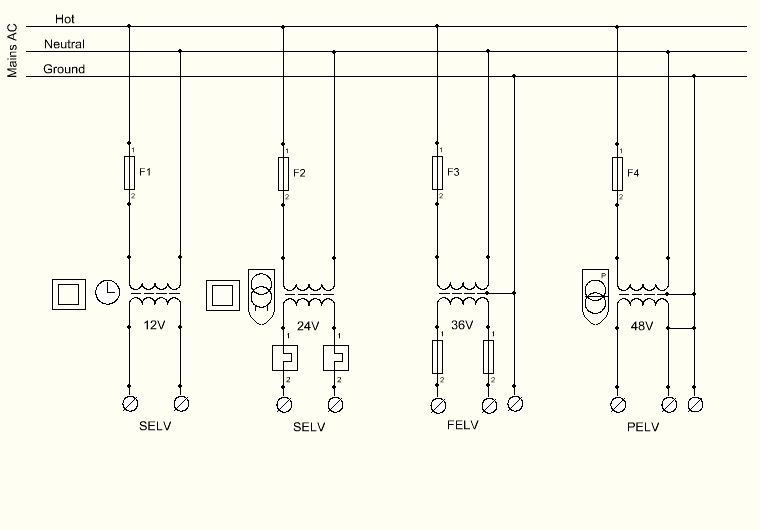
Low voltage installations for low voltage devices

IEC 61140 voltage bands	AC RMS	DC	Defining risk
High voltage	> 1,000	> 1,500	Electrical arcing
Low voltage	≤ 1,000	≤ 1,500	Electrical shock
Extra-low voltage	< 50	< 120	Electrical fire

Extra-low voltage (ELV) is an electricity supply voltage and is a part of the low-voltage band in a range which carries a low risk of dangerous electrical shock. There are various standards that define extra-low voltage. The International Electrotechnical Commission (IEC) in IEC 61140 define an ELV device or circuit as one in which the electrical potential between two conductors or between an electrical conductor and Earth (ground) does not exceed 120 volts (V) for ripple-free direct current (DC) or 50 V_{RMS} (root mean square volts) for alternating current (AC).

The IEC and IET go on to define actual types of extra-low voltage systems, for example separated extra-low voltage (SELV), protected extra-low voltage (PELV), functional extra-low voltage (FELV). These can be supplied using sources including motor / fossil fuel generator sets, transformers, switched PSU's or rechargeable battery. SELV, PELV, FELV, are distinguished by various safety properties, supply characteristics and design voltages.

Some types of landscape lighting use SELV / PELV (extra-low voltage) systems. Modern battery operated hand tools fall in the SELV category. In more arduous conditions, 25 V_{RMS} alternating current or 60 V (ripple-free) DC can be specified to further reduce hazard. Lower voltage can apply in wet or conductive conditions where there is even greater potential for electric shock. These systems should still fall under the SELV / PELV (ELV) safety specifications.

== Types ==
=== Separated or safety extra-low voltage (SELV) ===
IEC defines a SELV system as "an electrical system in which the voltage cannot exceed ELV under normal conditions, and under single-fault conditions, including earth faults in other circuits". The acronym may variously stand for safety extra-low voltage or separated extra-low voltage. It is generally accepted that the acronym: BS EN 60335 and the IEC refer to it as safety extra-low voltage, while separated extra-low voltage (separated from earth) is used and defined in installation standards (e.g. BS 7671).

A SELV circuit must have:

- Electrical protective-separation (i.e., double insulation, reinforced insulation or protective screening) from all circuits other than SELV and PELV (i.e., all circuits that might carry higher voltages)
- Simple separation from other SELV systems, from PELV systems and from earth (ground)

The safety of a SELV circuit is provided by

- The extra-low voltage
- The low risk of accidental contact with a higher voltage
- The lack of a return path through earth (ground) that electric current could take in case of contact with a human body

The design of a SELV circuit typically involves an isolating transformer, guaranteed minimum distances between conductors and electrical insulation barriers. The electrical connectors of SELV circuits should be designed such that they do not mate with connectors commonly used for non-SELV circuits.

Typical examples of a SELV circuit: decorative out-door lighting, Class III battery charger, fed from a Class II power supply. Modern cordless hand tools are considered SELV equipment.

=== Protected extra-low voltage (PELV) ===
IEC 61140 defines a PELV system as "an electrical system in which the voltage cannot exceed ELV under normal conditions, and under single-fault conditions, except earth faults in other circuits".

A PELV circuit only requires protective-separation from all circuits other than SELV and PELV (i.e., all circuits that might carry higher voltages), but it may have connections to other PELV systems and earth (ground).

In contrast to a SELV circuit, a PELV circuit can have a protective earth (ground) connection. A PELV circuit, just as with SELV, requires a design that guarantees a low risk of accidental contact with a higher voltage. For a transformer, this can mean that the primary and secondary windings must be separated by reinforced insulation, or by a conductive shield with a protective earth connection, or that the secondary winding itself has an earthed terminal, so that any primary to secondary fault will cause automatic disconnection. (The principle of double fault to danger requires either basic and additional insulation to fail or basic insulation and the connection to the protective earth to fail simultaneously before danger arises.)

A typical example for a PELV circuit is a metal cased computer with a Class I power supply.

=== Functional extra-low voltage (FELV) ===
The term functional extra-low voltage (FELV) describes any other extra-low-voltage circuit that does not fulfill the requirements for a SELV or PELV circuit. Although the FELV part of a circuit uses an extra-low voltage, it is not adequately protected from accidental contact with higher voltages in other parts of the circuit.

FELV is defined in IEC 60364-4-41 clause 411.7 as a circuit that:

- does not meet the requirements for PELV or SELV and where PEV or SELV is not necessary, and
- must have Basic protection against direct contact, and
- must have fault protection against indirect contact if accessible

Basic protection against direct contact (clause 411.7.2) can be provided either by Basic insulation rated to the nominal voltage of the primary circuit (e.g. AC mains), or by a barrier or enclosure complying with the various requirements in Annex A.2.

Fault protection against indirect contact (clause 411.7.3) requires that any "exposed-conductive-parts" of the FELV circuit be connected to the Protective Conductor (Earth/Ground, similar to Class I construction), and where the primary circuit (e.g. AC mains) is protected by "automatic disconnection of supply" through an RCD.

Any circuit connected to a "live" part that is considered Accessible to the user needs two levels of insulation safeguards between the Accessible circuit and the voltage source. Unless the inclusion of an RCD-like device is guaranteed by such a device being built in to the equipment then FELV circuits should remain not user accessible. Therefore, the protection requirements for the higher voltage have to be applied to the entire circuit.

Examples of a FELV circuit include DALI where each end of the link is specified as a FELV circuit with at least Basic insulation to AC mains.

Circuits that generate an extra low voltage from a "live" part through a semiconductor device, resistor, potentiometer or an autotransformer do not provide an insulation safeguard and cannot be considered FELV. Instead they are considered to be part of the "live" circuit. An example of this type of circuit is an electronically controlled toaster where the electronic timer circuit runs off an extra low voltage derived from a tap on the heating element. Another might be ELV signalling between mains powered smoke alarms, with the signalling voltage referred to supply neutral. In such cases these circuits must be enclosed or insulated as to the standard of the mains voltage.

=== UK Reduced low voltage (RLV) ===
The IET / BSI (BS 7671) also define Reduced Low Voltage (RLV) which can be either single-phase or three-phase AC This system has been used for many years on construction sites, in both single- and three-phase configurations. The single-phase voltage is 110 V a.c. though having a "centre tapped Earth" reducing the voltage to earth to 55 V AC. The three-phase system is 110 V phase-to-phase and 63 V to neutral / earth. This system voltage is slightly above the ELV limit, but is still very commonly used for cord-powered hand tools and temporary lighting in hazardous areas. As it is transformer-derived, the exposed voltage during an earth fault is depressed below the ELV level.

== Stand-alone power systems ==
Cabling for ELV systems, such as in remote-area power systems (RAPS), is designed to minimise energy losses while maximising safety. Lower voltages require a higher current for the same power. The higher current results in greater resistive losses in the cabling. Cable sizing must therefore consider maximum demand, voltage drop over the cable, and current-carrying capacity. Voltage drop is usually the main factor considered, but current-carrying capacity is as important when considering short, high-current runs such as between a battery bank and inverter.

Arcing is a risk in DC ELV systems, and some fuse types which can cause undesired arcing include semi-enclosed, rewireable and automotive fuse types. Instead, high rupturing capacity fuses and appropriately rated circuit breakers are the recommended type for RAPS. Cable termination and connections must be done properly to avoid arcing also, and soldering is not recommended.

== Regulations ==
Precise definitions of "extra low voltage" are given in applicable wiring regulations in a region.

=== European Union ===
According to DIN EN 61140:2016 chapter 4.2 Table 1 (German version of EU standard EN 61140), Extra Low Voltage (≤ 50 V a.c. or ≤ 120 V d.c.) is defined as a sub-category of Low voltage (≤ 1000 V a.c. or ≤ 1500 V d.c.). This is similar to the definition provided in IEC 61140:2016.

The European Union directives on the other hand do not define extra-low voltage. The nearest they get to this concept is in the Low Voltage Directive (2014/35/EU), which applies to the range between 50 V AC / 75 V DC and 1,000 V AC / 1,500 V DC. The General Product Safety Directive (2001/95/EC) covers consumer goods with a voltage below 50 V for alternating current, or below 75 V for direct current. The directive only covers electrical equipment and not voltages appearing inside equipment or voltages in electrical components.

=== IEC ===
IEC 61140: 2016, Basic safety publication defines ELV as ≤ 50 V_{RMS} AC and ≤ 120 V DC ripple-free.

IEC 60364-4-41: 2017, Group safety publication defines ELV as ≤ 50 V_{RMS} AC and ≤ 120 V DC ripple-free.

=== Australia and New Zealand ===
AS/NZS 3000 Wiring Rules define "extra low voltage" as "Not exceeding 50 V AC or 120 V ripple-free DC." However, AS/ACIF S009 Clause 3.1.78.1 Extra-Low Voltage (ELV) states: "a voltage not exceeding 42.4 V peak or 60 V DC [AS/NZS 60950.1:2003]" and adds a note: "This definition differs from the ELV definition contained in AS/NZS 3000:2000" which is more closely aligned to the Telecommunications Network Voltage (TNV) limits ... i.e. 120 V DC or 70.7 V AC peak (50 V_{RMS} AC)" which accommodates telephone ringing voltage on the nominally −48 V DC battery supply which could be encountered on a telephone line and was not considered hazardous, whereas 120 V AC without current limiting at its source can inject 115mA into individuals leading to fibrillation of the heart.

=== Brazil ===
In Brazil, ELV (Extra-baixa tensão or EBT in Portuguese) is officially defined in Regulatory Standard no. 10 from the Brazilian Ministry of Labor and Employment as any voltage "not exceeding 50 volts a.c. or 120 volts d.c.". Although that standard defines safety rules for electricity, the Regulatory Standard no. 12 requires an even lower voltage for start and stop devices on machines and equipment made from March 2012 and on, stating it shall not exceed 25 volts AC or 60 volts DC
