= Portable appliance testing =

Procedure in which electrical appliances are routinely checked for safety

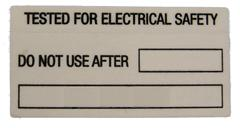
A common label for certifying that a device has been tested.

In electrical safety testing, portable appliance testing (PAT inspection or PAT testing) is a process by which electrical appliances are routinely checked for safety, commonly used in the United Kingdom, Ireland, New Zealand and Australia. In Australia and New Zealand it is commonly known as Test and Tag. The formal term for the process is In-service Inspection & Testing of Electrical Equipment.

Testing involves a visual inspection of the equipment and verification that power cables are in good condition. Additionally, other tests may be done when required, such as a verification of earthing (grounding) continuity, a test of the soundness of insulation between the current-carrying parts, and a check for any exposed live metal that could be touched. The formal limits for a pass/fail of these electrical tests vary somewhat depending on the category of equipment being tested.

Other countries have similar procedures, for example, testing of equipment according to DGUV Vorschrift 3 in Germany.

== Purpose ==
Health and safety regulations require that electrical appliances are safe and well maintained to prevent harm to workers. Many equipment manufacturers recommend testing at regular intervals to ensure continual safety, with the interval between tests varying based on both the type of appliance and the environment in which it is to be used. The European Low Voltage Directive governs the manufacture or importation of electrical appliances. Compliance with these standards has to be declared and indicated by the display of the CE mark on the product. The responsibility for testing lies with the manufacturer or the importer and is policed by Trading Standards.

In Australia and New Zealand the standard used is AS/NZS3760.

Testing equipment has been specifically developed for PAT inspections, based on the testing equipment used by manufacturers to ensure compliance with the British Standard Code of Practice and European product standards relevant to that type of appliance. This in turn allows testing and the interpretation of results to be de-skilled to a large extent. The inspection of the appliances can largely be carried out in-house in many organisations. This can result in cost savings and more flexibility as to exactly when a PAT is carried out.

== UK legal obligations ==
=== Appliances ===
British law (the Electricity at Work Regulations 1989) requires that all electrical systems (including electrical appliances) are maintained (so far as it is reasonable and practicable) to prevent risk of injury or danger. Domestic premises are not covered by this legislation, although occupiers' liability requires householders not to deliberately expose occupants or visitors to unreasonable risks. The HSE and the local authority are responsible for the policing of this legislation.

=== Fixed wiring in buildings ===
Guidance from the IET (published under the IEE brand) and the Health and Safety Executive (HSE) recommends that a competent person must inspect the installation regularly in any public building or a place that people work. They suggest initial intervals for combined inspection and testing that range from three months (for construction equipment) to one year, and in many cases, longer periods for re-testing (certain types of appliance in schools, hotels, offices and shops).

Although the Electricity at Work Regulations 1989 is an obligation on UK businesses, there is no obligation to undertake PAT inspection. In reality neither act nor their corresponding regulations and associated statutory instruments detail PAT inspection as an obligation, but rather impose a requirement of maintenance of safety and evidence of routine maintenance for all hand-held, portable and plug-in equipment.

Today a great many private companies and other organizations do meet their legal obligations to protect their workers by an enforced PAT regime, but it is not the only route.

Recent HSE publications have relaxed their tone somewhat to acknowledge this, and now point out that in many situations an annual PAT test is disproportionate to the risks and is often not required. In 2011, the HSE reviewed its approach to portable appliance maintenance in its own offices. Thinking about the type of equipment in use, and how it was used, the HSE looked back at the results from its annual testing of portable appliances across its estate over the last five years. Using the results of the previous tests, the HSE decided that further portable appliance tests are not needed within the foreseeable future or at all for certain types of portable equipment. Also, they decided to continue to monitor any faults reported as a result of user checks and visual inspections and review its maintenance system if evidence suggests that it needs revising. Electrical equipment will continue to be maintained by a series of user checks and visual inspections by staff that have had some training.

Annual portable appliance testing is not always necessary in low risk environments. In practice, decisions about when to test often take into account how equipment is used on a daily basis and the conditions it operates in. You do not need to be qualified as an electrician to carry out visual inspections. Regular user checks and visual inspections can be a good method of maintaining portable electric equipment. For landlords maintaining legal requirements it is not compulsory for them to have all appliances tested, but they do need to show a "duty of care" and most letting agents recommend that a test certificate is obtained.

=== Worksite and campus requirements, events and contractors ===
In the UK there is no legal instrument that requires a sub-contractor to ensure that all tools and equipment are PAT inspected before bringing onto a site of work. Neither is there any legal instrument which obliges the site owner to ensure third-party equipment is PAT inspected either by themselves or the equipment owner.

The internal policies of many UK businesses and educational establishments make mistaken reference to PAT inspection being a legal requirement under the Electricity at Work Regulations, which is false. Having such a policy is legitimate for internal reasons, but it is not underwritten by law; it is only their interpretation. Therefore, it is not a legal requirement to have a PAT inspection sticker or certificate, rather the obligation is that equipment must be safe.

The HSE recommend policies use phrases such as "equipment that is brought onto site for an event must be in a safe condition" and refrain from overzealous statements such as "must be PAT inspected" which can be restrictive without improving safety.

== Origins in UK ==
The first official appliance-testing equipment in the UK was used for government housing estates. This was under the control of the Property Services Agency – prior to 1972 the Ministry of Public Building and Works. In some cases testing was conducted on a three-month (high-risk) and six-month (low-risk) cycle from the early 1960s onwards. Extensive record-keeping was made into log-books and generally the equipment used was an insulation resistance tester, simple hand tools and visual inspection. Evidence of testing was clearly visible to workers in the form of "passed," "tested for electrical safety," and "do not use after..." labels affixed to various parts of the electrical equipment used. This early testing and inspection was done under a planned maintenance scheme and pre-dated both the Health and Safety at Work etc. Act 1974 and the Electricity at Work Regulations 1989.

== Inspection ==
PAT testing is not exclusively confined to formal testing but is rather a combination of inspection and testing processes. Most dangerous defects can be found simply by inspecting the appliances for obvious signs of damage such as frayed cables. According to the HSE, simple inspection can find more than 90% of defects.

== Testing ==
The tests an appliance is required to undergo will depend on the type of appliance, its electrical class and subject to a risk assessment by the technician. For example, it may not be safe to perform a leakage current test which powers up the appliance, if that appliance is something like a grinder, if it cannot be suitably secured.

The test equipment earth lead/probe is connected/touched to metal parts on both Class I and Class II appliances. For Class I an earth test is performed to prove good continuity between the earth pin of the appliance's plug and exposed metal parts on the appliance. For Class II an insulation test is performed which checks that voltage injected on the live supply wires (line and neutral) is sufficiently insulated from the appliance's case and any exposed metal parts (e.g. connectors).

=== Earthing continuity/resistance test ===
The equipment shall have a measured resistance of the protective earth circuit or the earthing conductor of an extension cord or appliance cord set, which does not exceed 1Ω.

Testing is performed using an ohmmeter or PAT tester

- Using the ohmmeter to produce a reading
- Using a PAT tester under the following conditions:
  - 12V maximum, test current range 100mA to 200mA - commonly known as "earth continuity test" or "screen test"
  - 12V maximum, test current 10A - commonly known as "routine test"
  - 12V maximum, 1.5 times rated current of appliance or 25A, whichever is greater - commonly known as "type test" or "bond test".

The choice of which of the tests to use is at the operator's discretion as there is merit in each test for given situations. Later model testers that are battery powered are limited to doing the "screen test". Older mains powered units can do all tests. The purpose of the high current test is to simulate a fault condition: if a live part contacts the earthed metalwork, the earth conductor should be able to carry sufficient current to blow the fuse and render the appliance safe, without the earth conductor itself burning out. On the other hand, some equipment (especially IT equipment) could be damaged by this test, as the earth connection is only for functional purposes and is not meant to be relied upon for safety.

=== Insulation resistance test ===
An insulation resistance test is performed to check the condition of conductor and component insulation. Values should not be less than 1MΩ for Class I and 2MΩ for Class II appliances at 500 V d.c., or at 250 V d.c. to avoid the equipment apparently failing the test because the metal oxide varistors (MOVs) or electro-magnetic interference (EMI) suppression triggered, for equipment containing voltage limiting devices such as MOVs or EMI suppression.

This test is performed using an insulation resistance test meter, or PAT tester, by applying a nominal voltage to the live conductors (line and neutral) of an appliance, and placing 0 volt reference on the earthed parts of a Class I appliance or the external metal parts of a Class II appliance;

==== Leakage current test ====
A leakage current test is sometimes used as an alternative to the insulation resistance test. A deficiency of the insulation resistance test is that the DC voltage will not activate electromagnetic switches or internal relays etc. that are common in many modern power tools, computers, and TVs, etc. and therefore it can only test the appliance up to those components. For such appliances an alternate leakage current test is available on some testing equipment which performs an AC based test (at reduced voltage), with values not exceeding 5mA for Class I appliances or 1mA for Class II appliances.

Some PAT Test machines (especially those which are battery powered) are able to perform a 'substitute leakage test' which applies a pulse of 40V into the appliance, and the measured leakage value is multiplied by 6 to give an estimation of the leakage value at 240V. This test has many limitations and has limited practical value, and was removed from the 5th edition Code of Practice in 2020.

AS/NZS 3760:2010 section 2.3.3.2 requires a leakage test to be carried out if equipment being tested must be energised to close the circuit or operate a switching device. Leakage testing does require the item being tested to be powered up thus meaning the item will switch on and operate.

=== Polarity check ===
In countries where the sockets are polarised, polarity testing is a simple test that can be carried out using a polarity tester to determine whether the line and neutral of the plug end are correctly connected to the corresponding terminals at the socket end.

=== Functional testing ===
Functional testing involves simply testing that functionality of the appliance actually works, and perhaps checking that the power consumption is normal.

=== Portable RCD testing ===
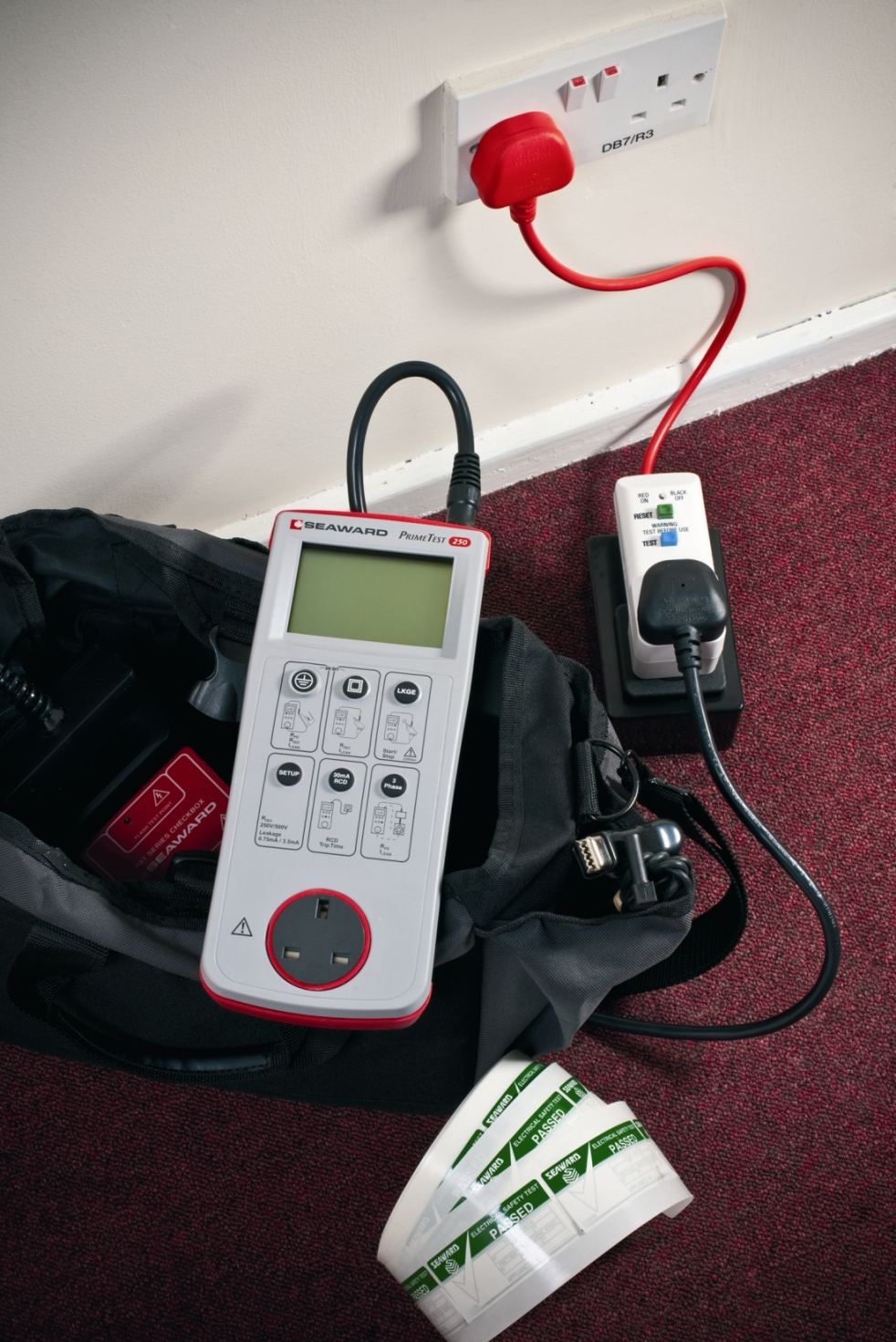
Modern PAT testers may include a test function for portable RCDs

The RCD functionality of a portable RCD, which provides RCD protection in the form of an adapter between an appliance and a socket, can be tested using the same techniques as for RCDs found in a building's fixed electrical installation. The testing functionality is included in some PAT testing equipment.

=== Radiation emissions testing ===
Specific microwave leakage testing was recommended for microwave ovens in the United Kingdom up until version 3 of the IET Code of Practice. This included testing that the device immediately ceases production of microwave radiation when the door is opened (a functional test), and testing that any radiation leakage when operating is less than 5 mWcm^{−2}.

A piece of calibrated equipment is required for radiation leakage testing. This is usually a hand-held device with a sensing antenna that can be scanned over the areas where the door meets the casing to find any radiation hot-spots whilst the unit is operating. As microwave ovens are not normally designed to be operated without a load this will usually take the form of an open container containing a quantity of water which is used to absorb the energy and as it gets warmed gives an indication that a unit not previously examined by a tester is actually producing microwaves. After checking for leakage the door is required to be opened and the measurement device is not to record a level above the given limit. In some scenarios a known quantity of water is heated for a known period of time and the temperature rise over the period of operation is used to generate an indication of the effective power output of the magnetron (another functional test). This can be helpful to determine whether the oven is operating at the expected power levels indicated by labelling.

Microwave leakage testing was removed in version 4 of the IET Code of Practice, to revert microwave oven testing to the same as any other appliance, but with emphasis put on the visual inspection of the door seal.

== Training and qualifications ==
In the UK there is no requirement to have a formal qualification to carry out formal PAT Testing, nor a need to be a qualified electrician or have a background in the electrical industry. The Electricity at Work regulations of 1989 simply state that where required, inspection and testing must be carried out by a competent person, however it does not mention a benchmark for competency. It has become accepted practice however for individuals operating as PAT Testers to hold a nationally recognised City & Guilds 2377–22 qualification (or a later version such as 2377-77 Level 3 Award in the In-service Inspection and Testing of Electrical Equipment (603/6790/8)). Guidance is provided by the IET in the form of the Code of Practice for In-service Inspection and Testing of Electrical Equipment – 5th Edition published in October 2021.

In Australia it is a legal requirement, per AS/NZS 3760 2010, that formal PAT testing (Test and Tag) is performed by a competent person, with suitable competence being gained through formal training, experience, or combination thereof.

In New Zealand it is not a legal requirement to attend a training course, however persons undertaking PAT Testing must be deemed competent by a responsible person (being the owner of the premises' electrical equipment or someone with a legal responsibility for the safety of electrical equipment).

== Test instruments ==
PAT testing can be conducted using either a collection of instruments that each perform a single specific type of test, such as an insulation resistance tester, or using an instrument in which all necessary test functionality is combined.

=== Pass / fail instruments ===
These are the simple-to-use, comparatively much cheaper, and often used by businesses who test in-house. These test instruments simply display PASS or FAIL when a test is carried out. Mains powered testers require AC power. Battery operated testers are self-contained and convenient to use. They usually come with rechargeable batteries.

Aside from pass and fail indication, the interface will also include an option for selecting between Class I and Class II appliances.

=== Advanced instruments ===
Advanced test instruments display much more detailed result information, such as the measurement in Ohms of an insulation resistance test. They may also provide more options giving greater control over how each test carried out, for example providing a choice of test voltages for an insulation resistance test. Detailed readings naturally require greater knowledge to understand and interpret.

Advanced PAT testers can be effective as facility management tools because they may record the location and test status of electrical equipment and appliances.

=== Computerised instruments ===
Some advanced PAT testers can transfer information to a computer. Bluetooth-enabled computerised PAT testers make the two way transfer of test data between the test instrument and PC-based record keeping systems much simpler, and can be used with other test accessories such as label printers.

=== Calibration ===
As PAT test instruments are sophisticated devices and perform an important safety role. As such it is important to make sure that they are continuing to measure correctly. If an instrument is not periodically checked and calibrated, then the accuracy of tests performed since it was last checked are drawn into question, which could create a problem in the event of a claim. It is usually recommended that calibration is carried out annually.

When a PAT test instrument is calibrated, it is internally trimmed to match the original specification.

Dual purpose check boxes (which are essentially known resistances either side of the test limits) have also been introduced, which are capable of validating the accuracy of both electrical installation testers and portable appliance testers in the field, reducing the risk of a tester being used when not operating correctly - this also allows the re-calibration interval to be increased.
