= 650 (disambiguation) =

650 may refer to:

- 650 (number)
- 650 AM, an AM radio frequency
- Area code 650
- IBM 650 magnetic drum data-processing machine, introduced in 1953
- The year 650 BCE
- The year 650 CE
- 650C: A standard bicycle wheel size.
