= Electrical safety testing =

Testing to ensure the compliance of electrical systems with safety standards

In relation to electrical usage, electrical safety testing aims to ensure that electrical products and installations are safe. To meet this goal, governments and various technical bodies have developed electrical safety standards. All countries have their own electrical safety standards that must be complied with. To meet to these standards, electrical products and installations must pass electrical safety tests.

Some types of electrical safety tests include:

- dielectric withstand test (also called a hipot test)
- insulation resistance test (IR test)
- earth continuity test
- leakage current test.

Electrical safety tests are described in various national and international standards.

== Electrical safety tests ==
=== Dielectric voltage withstand test ===
A dielectric voltage withstand test (also known as a hipot test) is done by applying a voltage higher than operating voltage to the device or installation under test. In this test, the electric insulation of a product or installation is put under a voltage stress much higher than its normal operating voltage. If the hipot test is done for type testing purposes, a much larger voltage may be applied.

=== Insulation resistance test (IR test) ===
An insulation resistance test (IR test) measures the electrical resistance of insulation by applying a voltage between two locations, and measuring the resultant current flow. Proper safety precautions must be taken when doing this test, such as exclusion zones, making sure no wires are exposed, and personal protective equipment is worn. To do this test, you need to have an insulation resistance tester, which may be a small hand held battery powered device, up to a larger luggage sized tool able to achieve higher test voltages. Variables to choose before starting an electrical resistance test is the test voltage, test duration, and test points. Acceptable values of insulation resistance vary depending on circuit purpose, industry, and country. Typically, standards will dictate acceptable values. An insulation resistance test can be used for simple go/no-go testing, or for periodic condition assessment, where routine insulation resistance tests are performed, with the results tracked over time. By tracking the insulation resistance of a circuit over time, preventative maintenance may be able to be planned before equipment failure. Insulation resistance is dependent on temperature and humidity variations, therefore the temperature and humidity should be recorded when testing and compensation applied to the measured value given. Many standards and safety agencies have specified the insulation resistance test as a required test for electrical installations and electrical products. This test may be referred to as "meggering', after the company Megger was one of the first companies to commercialize an insulation resistance test meter. These days, many other brands are widely available.

=== Earth continuity test ===
An earth continuity test checks if a metal part is connected to earth. The resistance of the connection to earth can also be measured.

=== Leakage current test ===
A leakage current test detects current that does not flow back through the circuit. This test may be used as part of testing GFCI or RCD operation.

== Electrical safety test categories ==
Visual inspection

A survey without touching anything, and looking at the electrical installation or product before starting any electrical testing. A visual inspection seeks to identify damaged insulation, disconnected wires, incorrect installation, and any other visual issues.

Dead testing

Continuity test: a test to check the wiring is correct

Earth continuity test: this test is to make sure the earthing system is properly connected

Live testing

Earth fault loop impedance testing: this test is to check that if a fault did occur, that the system meets requirements to cause a disconnection of the supply within the time limit specified by standards

Insulation resistance testing

Polarity test: a test to check that the connections are connected in the right sequence

RCD testing: on modern electrical systems RCD's and RCBO's are regularly fitted, these devices react to electricity leaking from the circuit. Leakage may happen when a person touches live parts, which can cause electricity to passes through their body instead of the normal circuit return path.

== Means of Protection (MOP) ==
No one means of protection should be totally necessary to the device's safety, so that the failure of one should not make the device immediately dangerous.

MOP practices are further divided into MOOP and MOPP.

=== Means of Operator Protection (MOOP) ===
A concept introduced in the standard for medical electrical equipment IEC 60601-1.

=== Means of Patient Protection (MOPP) ===
Electrical safety standard set forward by standards organizations across the globe such as the American National Standards Institute (ANSI), Canadian Standards Association, and European Commission in IEC60601-1. MOPP safety standards aim to set basic safety requirements for medical electrical equipment. "With hazardous voltages present in a system a robust and reliable approach to isolation is needed such that multiple and un-related insulation system failures would need to occur before an operator or patient is put at risk. To achieve this, two independent measures of protection are required or a single measure of physical isolation such as creepage/clearance or solid insulation deemed equivalent." In addition to the insulation of the device being powered the additional main points the organizations have set forward with the implementation of the MOPP standards are:

- Leakage current requirements.
  - The maximum allowable patient leakage current is 500μA AC and 50μA DC in normal operation (normal condition, NC) and 1000μA AC or 100μA DC in single failure condition (SFC).
- Requirements for the input stage.
- Temperature measurement and requirements.
- Printed circuit board (PCB) thickness requirements for multilayered boards.
  - The distance for insulation thickness of 0.4 mm or three layers of insulation foil (Prepreg) are acceptable for reinforced insulation.
- Dielectric testing.
- Maximum output energy
- Enclosure and mechanical fire requirements

Example

Classifications	Isolation	Creepage/ Clearance	Insulation
1 x MOOP	1500 Vac	2.5mm / 2mm	Basic
2 x MOOP	3000 Vac	5mm / 4mm	Double
1 x MOPP	1500 Vac	4mm / 2.5mm	Basic
2 x MOPP	4000 Vac	8mm / 5mm	Double

Example showing the differences between the isolation and creepage requirements for MOOP and MOPP.

== See also ==
- Portable appliance testing
