= Low Voltage Directive =

European Union directive

The Low Voltage Directive (LVD), 2014/35/EU, specifies common standards in the European Single Market for "electrical equipment designed for use with a voltage rating of between 50 and 1 000 V for alternating current and between 75 and 1 500 V for direct current, other than the equipment and phenomena listed in Annex II". The Directive provides common broad objectives for safety regulations, so that electrical equipment approved by any EU member country will be acceptable for use in all other EU countries. The Low Voltage Directive does not supply any specific technical standards that must be met, instead relying on IEC technical standards to guide designers to produce safe products. Products that conform to the general principles of the Low Voltage Directive and the relevant particular safety standards are marked with the CE marking to indicate compliance and acceptance throughout the EU. Conformance is asserted by the manufacturer, based on its conformity assessment.

This directive updated and replaced 2006/95/EC.

== Application ==
The directive covers electrical equipment designed for use with a voltage rating of between 50 and 1000 volts for alternating current (AC) or between 75 and 1500 volts for direct current (DC). Importantly, it does not cover voltages within equipment. The directive does not cover components (broadly, this refers to individual electronic components).

Certain classes of equipment, covered by other technical standards, are listed in Annex II of the Directive as excluded from its scope. These items include medical devices, electricity meters, railway or maritime equipment, and electrical plugs and sockets for domestic use.

== UK implementation ==
In the United Kingdom, the directive is implemented by "The Electrical Equipment (Safety) Regulations 2016".

== See also ==
- Low voltage
- High voltage
