= BS 7671 =

British standard for electrical installations

BS 7671 "Requirements for Electrical Installations. IET Wiring Regulations", is the national standard in the United Kingdom for electrical installations and the safety of electrical wiring systems. It is informally known as "The Regs" (in reference to regulations) in the electrical community.

Formal recognition as a British Standard did not occur until after the publication of the 16th edition in 1992. The standard takes account of the technical substance of agreements reached in CENELEC.

BS 7671 is also used as a national standard by Mauritius, St Lucia, Saint Vincent and the Grenadines, Sierra Leone, Singapore, Sri Lanka, Trinidad and Tobago, Uganda, Cyprus, and several other countries, which base their wiring regulations on it.

The latest edition is BS 7671:2018+A4:2026, which is the 18th Edition, originally published in 2018, further incorporating amendment number 4, issued in 2026.

== Scope ==
=== Locations ===
The regulations in BS 7671 apply to the design, selection, erection and verification of electrical installations such as those of:

1. residential premises
2. commercial premises
3. public premises
4. industrial premises
5. prefabricated buildings
6. low voltage generating sets
7. highway equipment and street furniture
8. locations containing a bath or shower
9. swimming pools and other basins
10. rooms and cabins containing sauna heaters
11. construction and demolition sites
12. agricultural and horticultural premises
13. conducting locations with restricted movement
14. caravan / camping parks and similar locations
15. marinas and similar locations
16. medical locations
17. exhibitions, shows and stands
18. solar photovoltaic (PV) power supply systems
19. outdoor lighting
20. extra-low voltage lighting
21. power over ethernet
22. mobile or transportable units
23. caravans and motor caravans
24. electric vehicle charging
25. operating and maintenance gangways
26. temporary installations for structures, amusement devices and booths at fairgrounds, amusement parks and circuses including professional stage and broadcast applications
27. floor and ceiling heating systems
28. onshore units of electrical shore connections for inland navigation vessels.

'Premises' covers the land and all facilities including buildings belonging to it.

Exclusions:

1. systems for the distribution of electricity to the public other than prosumer's installations covered by Chapter 82
2. railway traction equipment, rolling stock and signalling equipment
3. equipment of motor vehicles, except those to which the requirements of the Regulations concerning caravans or mobile units are applicable
4. equipment on board ships covered by BS 8450, BS EN 60092-507, BS EN ISO 13297 or BS EN ISO 10133
5. equipment of mobile and fixed offshore installations
6. equipment of aircraft
7. those aspects of mines specifically covered by Statutory Regulations
8. radio interference suppression equipment, except so far as it affects safety of the electrical installation
9. lightning protection systems for buildings and structures covered by BS EN 62305
10. those aspects of lift installations covered by relevant parts of BS 5655 and BS EN 81 and those aspects of escalator or moving walk installations covered by relevant parts of BS 5656 and BS EN 115
11. electrical equipment of machines covered by BS EN 60204
12. electric fences covered by BS EN 60335-2-76
13. the DC side of cathodic protection systems complying with the relevant part(s) of BS EN ISO 12696, BS EN 12954, BS EN ISO 13174, BS EN 13636 and BS EN 14505.

=== Supply characteristics ===
BS 7671 only covers electrical systems with the following characteristics:

- having a nominal voltage up to but not exceeding 1000V AC or 1500V DC
- for AC having a supply frequency of 50, 60 or 400Hz, though the use of other frequencies for special purposes is not excluded.

This includes low-voltage installations, as found in most domestic and commercial properties, and extra-low-voltage systems, but excludes high voltage, as found in generation, transmission and distribution networks.

== Compilation and publication ==
The standard is maintained by the Joint IET/BSI Technical Committee JPEL/64, the UK National Committee for Wiring Regulations, and published jointly by the IET (formerly IEE) and BSI. Although the IET and BSI are non-governmental organisations and the Wiring Regulations are non-statutory, they are referenced in several UK statutory instruments, and in most cases, for practical purposes, have legal force as the appropriate method of electric wiring.

The BSI (British Standards Institute) publishes numerous titles concerning acceptable standards of design/safety/quality across different fields.

== History of BS 7671 and predecessor standards ==
The first edition was published in 1882 as the "Rules and Regulations for the Prevention of Fire Risks arising from Electric Lighting." The title became "General Rules recommended for Wiring for the Supply of Electrical Energy" with the third edition in 1897, "Wiring Rules" with the fifth edition of 1907, and settled at "Regulations for the Electrical Equipment of Buildings" with the eighth edition in 1924.

Since the 15th edition (1981), these regulations have closely followed the corresponding international standard IEC 60364. In 1992, the IEE Wiring Regulations became British Standard BS 7671 so that the legal enforcement of their requirements was easier both with regard to the Electricity at Work regulations and from an international point of view. They are now treated similar to other British Standards. BS 7671 has converged towards (and is largely based on) the European Committee for Electrotechnical Standardization (CENELEC) harmonisation documents, and therefore is technically very similar to the current wiring regulations of other European countries.

== Timeline ==
The historical timeline of publication can be found within documents published by the IET, such as within the PDF detailing amendment 3 to the 18th edition, and is summarised below, along with some notable other events. Only major changes between editions/amendments are noted.

Year	Ed.	Pub.	Notes
1882	1st	IEE	Entitled ‘Rules and Regulations for the prevention of Fire Risks Arising from Electric Lighting’, and known as the "Wiring Rules". Two core cable, line and neutral, no earth. Protection was a re-wirable fuse.
1888	2nd	IEE	Entitled 'Wiring Rules & Regulations in Buildings.
1897	3rd	IEE	Entitled ‘General Rules recommended for Wiring for the Supply of Electrical Energy’.
1903	4th	IEE	
1907	5th	IEE	Entitled ‘Wiring Rules’.
1911	6th	IEE	
1916	7th	IEE	
1924	8th	IEE	Entitled ‘Regulations for the Electrical Equipment of Buildings’.
1927	9th	IEE	
1934	10th	IEE	Three-phase colours changed to red, white and green; neutral or earth to black.
1939	11th	IEE	Last edition to allow sockets in a bathroom. Three-phase colours changed to red, white and blue; black for neutral or earth. Revised in 1943; reprint with minor amendments in 1945; supplement issued in 1946; revision to section 8 in 1948.
1950	12th	IEE	Three-phase colours of red white and blue; black for neutral or earth in fixed wiring; green earth in flex. Supplement issued 1954. First mention of PVC insulated cables.
1955	13th	IEE	Reprinted in 1958, 1961, 1962, 1964.
1966	14th	IEE	Added earthing on lighting circuits. Reprinted with amendments in 1968 and 1969, a supplement was issued 'on use in metric terms' in 1969, amended and reprinted 'in metric units' in 1970, reprinted in 1972 and 1973, amended and reprinted 1974 and 1976.
1981	15th	IEE	Entitled 'Regulations for Electrical Installations'. Issued with red cover. Amended and reprinted in 1983 (green cover), 1984 (yellow cover), amended in 1985, amended and reprinted in 1986 (blue cover; to remove voltage operated earth leakage circuit breakers), 1987 (brown cover), and finally just reprinted with minor corrections (no amendment) in 1988 (brown cover).
1991	16th	IEE	Issued with red cover. Reprinted with minor corrections in 1992 (red cover), then again in the same year retitled as 'Requirements for Electrical Installations BS 7671:1992' (red cover; see next entry). Amended (no. 1) and reprinted in 1994 (green cover), 1997 (no. 2; yellow cover), and amended again (no. 3) in 2000. Then reissued as BS 7671:2001 in 2001 (blue cover), and amended further (no. 1) in 2002 and amended again (no. 2) and reprinted in 2004 (brown cover). The 2004 amendment saw major changes to wire colouring, following European-wide harmonisation efforts. Quoting the amendment document: Amendment No.2:2004 to BS 7671:2001 implements the cable core colours introduced in the revision of CENELEC Harmonization Document HD 308 S2: 2001 Identification of cores in cables and flexible cords and agrees generally with BS EN 60446 : 2000 Basic and safety principles for the man-machine interface, marking and identification. Identification of conductors by colours or numerals and BS EN 60445 : 2000 Basic and safety principles for man-machine interface, marking and identification of equipment terminals and of terminations…. The single-phase colours of red phase and black neutral are replaced by brown phase and blue neutral. These colours have been used in appliance flexible cables since 1969. The cable core colours are described in IEC 60304 (1982-01), Standard colours for insulation for low- frequency cables and wires. The three-phase phase colours are brown, black and grey instead of red, yellow and blue. Where a circuit includes a neutral or mid-point conductor identified by colour, the colour used shall be blue. In all installations the earth or protective conductor will remain green-and-yellow.
1992	-	-	The IEE wiring regulations were adopted by the British Standards Institute as BS 7671.
1992	-	-	The Electricity at Work Regulations legislation come fully into effect in Northern Ireland.
2002	-	-	The Electricity Safety, Quality and Continuity Regulations 2002 (legislation) required consumer electrical installations incorporating generators operating in parallel with the grid, or as a switched alternative to the grid, to conform to BS 7671 (Regulations 21 and 22).
2004	-	-	Part P of the Building Regulations ("Requirements for Electrical Installations") came into force, covering legal requirements for domestic electrical installations in England and Wales. The guidance in the accompanying Approved Documents refers explicitly to BS 7671 as being one way to achieve compliance.
2006	-	-	The IEE merged with the IIE to form the IET.
2008	17th	IET/BSI	First new edition to be published by the IET (jointly with the BSI). RCDs were now required for most outlets in domestic premises or otherwise for general use by unskilled persons. Issued with red cover. Amended (no. 1) and reprinted in 2011 (green cover), amended (no. 2) Aug 2013, amended (no. 3) and reprinted 2015 (yellow cover). Amendment 1 replaced Periodic inspection reports (PIRs) with Electrical Installation Condition Reports (EICRs), a section on surge protection devices (SPDs) was introduced, and some details relating to medical locations were added. Amendment 2 added a new section on electric vehicle charging. Amendment 3 introduced requirements for the use of non-combustable consumer units (or enclosures) in domestic premises, along with use of metal wiring/containment clips in certain situations, and expanded use of RCDs into commercial/industrial spaces. New sections have been added relating to microgeneration and solar photovoltaic systems, and breakers (including high resilience breaker layout).
2018	18th	IET/BSI	Introduced energy efficiency performance levels and the use of surge protection devices and arc fault detection devices. Issued with blue cover. Amended February 2020 (no. 1), changing rules on car charging. Amended (no. 2) and reprinted March 2022 (brown cover). Amended (no. 3) July 2024, introducing the concept of bi-directional vs. uni-directional protective devices in response to issue of how existing devices were being used for prosumer power generation circuits. Amended (no. 4) April 2026 (Orange Cover) to cover power over ethernet and battery storage systems

== See also ==
- British Standards
- Electrical code
- Electrical wiring
- Electrical wiring (UK)
- IEC 60364
- Earthing system
