= Recloser =

Electricity distribution networks circuit breakers

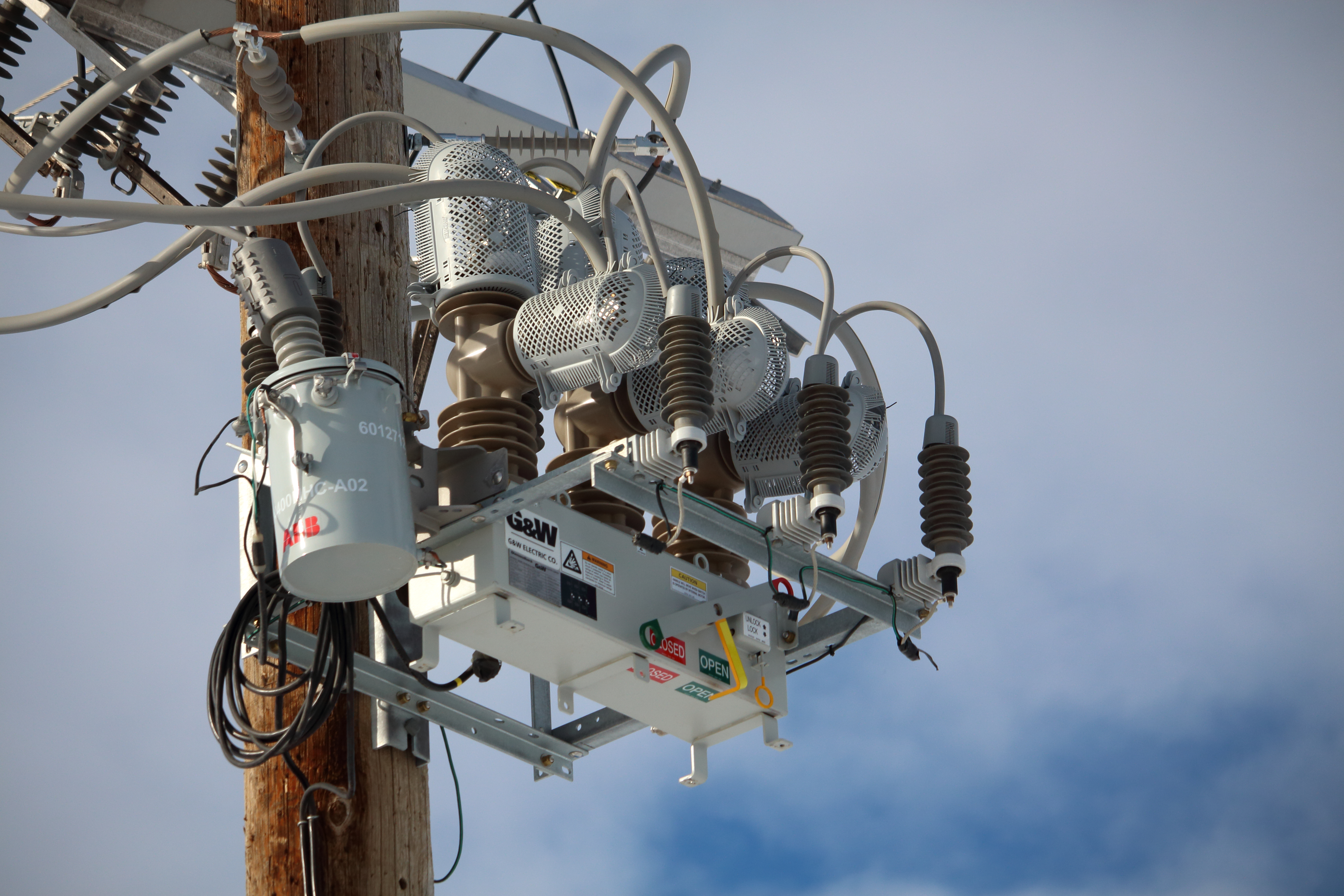
- A pole-mounted recloser assembly
- Component type: Automatic circuit breaker
- Invention year: Mid-1900s

3D model of a three-phase electrical recloser

In electric power distribution, a recloser, also known as autorecloser or automatic circuit recloser (ACR), is a switchgear designed for use on overhead electricity distribution networks to detect and interrupt transient faults. Reclosers are essentially rated circuit breakers with integrated current and voltage sensors and a protection relay, optimized for use as a protection asset. Reclosers are governed by the IEC 62271-111/IEEE Std C37.60 and IEC 62271-200 standards. The four major classes of operating maximum voltage are 15.5 kV, 27 kV, 38 kV and 72 kV.

For overhead electric power distribution networks, up to 80-87% of faults are transient. Transient faults can occur due to various causes, such as lightning strikes, voltage surges, or foreign objects coming into contact with exposed distribution lines. When a transient fault occurs, the resulting arc will ionize the air. The ionized air will maintain the arc even after the material that caused the short circuit is removed. Consequently, these transient faults can be resolved by a simple reclose operation. The minimum reclose time allowed for any operation is .3 seconds. This is the minimum amount of time required for the ionization to dissipate from the arc path. Reclosers are designed to handle a rapid open-close duty cycle, where electrical engineers can optionally configure the number and timing of attempted close operations prior to transitioning to a lockout stage. The number of reclose attempts is limited to a maximum of four by recloser standards noted above.

At two multiples of the rated current, the recloser's rapid trip curve can cause a trip (off circuit) in as little as 1.5 cycles (or 30 milliseconds). During those 1.5 cycles, other separate circuits can see voltage dips or blinks until the affected circuit opens to stop the fault current. Automatically closing the breaker after it has tripped and stayed open for a brief amount of time, usually after 1 to 5 seconds, is a standard procedure.

Reclosers are often used as a key component in a smart grid, as they are effectively computer controlled switchgear which can be remotely operated and interrogated using supervisory control and data acquisition (SCADA) or other communications. Interrogation and remote operation capabilities allow utilities to aggregate data about their network performance, and develop automation schemes for power restoration. Automation schemes can either be distributed (executed at the remote recloser level) or centralized (close and open commands issued by a central utility control room to be executed by remotely controlled closes).

== Description ==
Reclosers are made in single-phase and three-phase versions, using oil, vacuum, or sulfur hexafluoride (SF_{6}) interrupters. Controls for the reclosers range from the original electromechanical systems to digital electronics with metering and SCADA functions. The ratings of reclosers run from 2.4–38 kV for load currents from 10–1200 A and fault currents from 1–16 kA.

On a 3-phase circuit, a recloser is more beneficial than three separate fuse cutouts. For example, on a wye to delta conversion, when cutouts are used on the wye side and only 1 out of 3 of the cutout fuses open, some customers on the delta side have a low voltage condition, due to voltage transfer through the transformer windings. Low voltage can cause severe damage to electronic equipment. But when a recloser is used, all three phases open, thereby eliminating the problem.

== History ==
Reclosers were invented in the mid 1900s in the USA with the earliest reclosers introduced by Kyle Corporation in the early 1940s. Reclosers were originally oil-filled hydraulic devices with rudimentary mechanical-protection-relaying capabilities. Modern automatic circuit reclosers are significantly more advanced than the original hydraulic units. The advent of semiconductor based electronic protective relays in the 1980s resulted in increased recloser sophistication, allowing for differing responses to the various cases of abnormal operation or fault on an electric power distribution network. The high-voltage insulation and interrupting devices in modern reclosers typically consist of solid dielectric insulation with vacuum interrupters for current interruption and arc quenching.

== Purposes ==
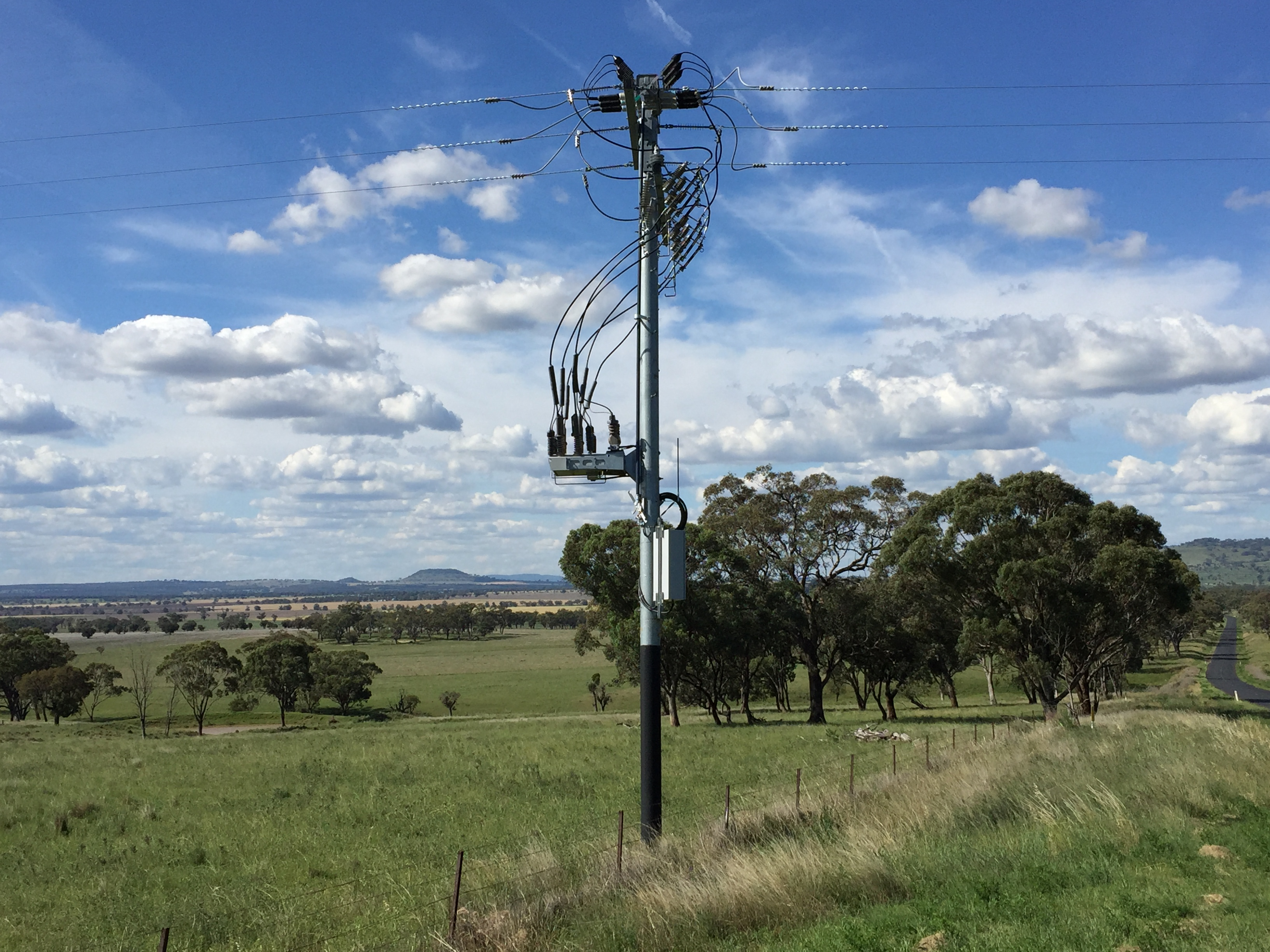
A recloser installed on a rural feeder

=== Protection during fault conditions ===
To prevent electric power distribution network damage, each station along the network is protected with circuit breakers or fuse cutouts which turn off power in the event of a short circuit. These protection solutions present a major problem when restoring power immediately following transient events, because repair crews need to manually reset the circuit breakers or replace fuses.

Alternatively, reclosers are programmed to automate the reset process remotely after a short circuit and allow a more granular approach to service restoration, resulting in increased availability of supply. Using reclosers during a transient fault, for instance, a tree limb blown off a tree during a windstorm that lands on the power line and quickly clear itself as the limb falls to the ground, allows power to be remotely restored.

=== Remote restoration ===
Reclosers can save significant operational expenditure when operated remotely, as they can reduce the need of field crews to travel to site to reset devices which have transitioned to lockout.

=== Division ===
Reclosers can also address electric power distribution network damage by dividing up the network into smaller sections, possibly at every electric power distribution downstream branch point, which handle much less power than the breakers at the feeder stations, and can be set to trip at much lower power levels. Consequently, a single event on the grid will cut off only the section handled by a single recloser, long before the feeder station would notice a problem and cut power.

=== Reconfiguration and load flow resolution ===
Reclosers can resolve load flow issues by reconfiguring the electric power distribution network.

== Typical fault conditions and reclosing principles ==
The basic philosophy of reclosing is to actively consider the fault types and provide an effective response based on probabilities of the detected fault type. Fault currents are sensed by current sensing transformers.

=== Lightning ===
The primary class of fault type on an overhead distribution network is lightning strike. Lightning surges increase voltage which can cause localised breakdown of insulation, allow arcing over insulators. Reclosers can detect this as an overcurrent or earth fault (depending on the asymmetry of the fault). Lightning surges pass very quickly (reduce in 50ms), so the first reclose can be configured to both trip and reclose quickly. This first reclose allows for interruption of the arcing caused by lightning, but restores the power quickly.

=== Vegetation contact or equipment failure ===
If after the first, swift reclose, the recloser closes onto a fault, it is likely that the fault is a secondary class of fault, vegetation contact or equipment failure. An overcurrent fault would indicate a line to line class fault, which can be confirmed by negative phase sequence overcurrent protection, whereas an earth fault can indicate a Line to Ground or Double Line to Ground fault. Reclosers can then apply a fuse burning policy, where they remain closed for a short period to allow fuses on lateral lines to burn, isolating the fault. If the fault is not cleared, the recloser trips open again. This same policy can be used to deliver energy to fault sites to burn the fault off the line. This could be a branch crossing between multiple lines, or fauna (birds, snakes, etc.) coming into contact with the conductors.

=== Sensitive ground fault / sensitive earth fault ===
Sensitive earth fault protection in reclosers is typically set to immediate lockout. This detection of small leakage currents (less than 1 ampere) on a medium voltage line can indicate insulator failure, broken cables or lines coming into contact with trees. There is no merit in applying reclosing to this scenario, and the industry best practice is not to reclose on sensitive earth fault. Reclosers with sensitive earth fault protection capable of detecting 500 mA and below are used as a fire mitigation technique, as they provide an 80% risk reduction in fire starts, however they are never to be used as reclosers in this application, only as single shot distributed circuit breakers which allow for sensitivity to verify the existence of these faults.

=== Dead time intervals ===
Dead Time Intervals For Distribution Systems	Typical Setting Range (seconds)
Initial Trip to 1st Reclose	0 to 5 seconds
2nd Trip to 2nd Reclose	10 to 20 seconds
3rd Trip to 3rd Reclose	10 to 30 seconds

== Applications ==
Traditional reclosers were designed simply to automate the action of a line crew visiting a remote distribution site to close a tripped circuit breaker and attempt to restore power. With the advanced protection functionality of modern reclosers, these devices are used in a multitude of additional applications

Application	Methodology	Requirements
Mid-Feeder Protection	Conventional Recloser Deployment	Conventional Recloser
Fire Risk Mitigation	No Reclosing at all. Sensitive Ground Fault (North America) or Sensitive Earth Fault protection pickup at 500 mA removes 80% risk of fire start	Recloser with SGF/SEF Capability at 500 mA
Smart Grid Distribution Network Automation	Centralised or Distributed	Centralised Automation requires remote communication through SCADA or otherwise. Distributed Automation can be configured at the Recloser Controller
Renewable Connection	Modern Recloser Controllers use ANSI 25 Synchrocheck, 59N Neutral Voltage Displacement, Synchrophasors, ANSI 25A Auto-Synchronisor and other voltage protection	Voltage Sensing on both sides of Recloser
Substation Circuit Breakers	Using Reclosers installed in a Substation where peak fault currents do not exceed the maximum rated interrupting capacity, usually only Rural Substations	Typically maximum bus fault currents below 16 kA
Single Wire Earth Return Network Protection	SWER network design topology is discouraged in modern electrical engineering due to safety reasons, but due to cost savings it is sometimes deployed. Single Phase Reclosers can be used to improve safety on these lines during fault events.	Single Phase Recloser
Single Phase Laterals Overcurrent Protection	As a key overcurrent protection element on single phase laterals, a North American network style design. 3 single phase units can be combined into a "Single Triple" arrangement, where single phase reclosing can improve reliability to unfaulted phases during transient fault events. Despite the ability to lock single phases with a "Single Triple" arrangement during a permanent fault on one phase, the risk of circulating currents is high and typically a 3 phase lockout is implemented.	Single Triple Recloser or Single Phase Recloser System
Mobile Mining Equipment Protection	Reclosers can be used to protect three phase mining equipment. These devices are occasionally mounted in mobile kiosks that can be moved as the equipment is moved around the mine site. Design complexity of protection equipment is reduced in these applications, as reclosers include all protection and control required to meet the application; which reduces testing and commissioning costs of the equipment.	Recloser in a Kiosk installation format.

== Reclosers in action ==
Residential customers in areas fed by affected overhead power lines can occasionally see the effects of an recloser in action. If the fault affects the customer's own distribution circuit, they may see one or several brief, complete outages followed by either normal operation (as the recloser succeeds in restoring power after a transient fault has cleared) or a complete outage of service (as the recloser exhausts its maximum 4 retries).

If the fault is on an adjacent circuit to the customer, the customer may see several brief "dips" (sags) in voltage as the heavy fault current flows into the adjacent circuit and is interrupted one or more times. A typical manifestation would be the dip, or intermittent black-out, of domestic lighting during an electrical storm. Recloser action may result in electronic devices losing time settings, losing data in volatile memory, halting, restarting, or suffering damage due to power interruption. Owners of such equipment may need to protect electronic devices against the consequences of power interruptions and also power surges.

== Sectionalizer integration ==
Reclosers may cooperate with down-stream protective devices called sectionalizers, usually a disconnector or cutouts equipped with a tripping mechanism triggered by a counter or a timer. A sectionalizer is generally not rated to interrupt fault current however it often has a larger Basic Insulation Level, allowing some sectionalizers to be used as a point of isolation. Each sectionalizer detects and counts fault current interruptions by the recloser (or circuit breaker). After a pre-determined number of interruptions, the sectionalizer will open, thereby isolating the faulty section of the circuit, allowing the recloser to restore supply to the other non-fault sections. Some modern recloser controllers can be configured to have reclosers operate in sectionalizer mode. This is used in applications where protection grading margins are too small to provide effective protection co-ordination between electrical assets.

== Fire safety and wildfires ==
Fire risk is an innate risk of an overhead distribution network. Regardless of the choice of distribution protection switchgear, the fire risk is always higher with overhead conductors than with underground transmission.

The Victorian Royal Commission into the 2009 bushfires indicated that reclosing must be disabled on high bushfire risk days, however on low risk days it should be applied for reliability of supply.

Incorrectly configured or old model reclosers have been implicated in the starting or spread of wildfires. Research into the Australian 2009 Black Saturday Bushfires indicated that reclosers operating as single shot circuit breakers with Sensitive Ground Fault protection configured at 500mA would reduce fire start risk by 80%. Any form of reclosing should be removed on high fire risk days, and reclosing in general should not be applied to detected Sensitive Earth Fault faults.

Victorian utilities responded to the Royal Commission by converting some of their overhead network in high risk areas to underground cable, replacing exposed overhead conductors with insulated cables, and replacing old reclosers with modern ones with remote communications to ensure that settings can be adjusted on high bushfire risk days.

== See also ==
- Smart grid
- Circuit breaker
- Spot network substation
- Electrical engineering
- Renewable energy
