= RMU =

RMU may refer to:

== Instruments ==
- Ring Main Unit, electrical instrument

== Universities ==
- Robert Morris University
- Robert Morris University Illinois
- Rawalpindi Medical University
- Rhine-Main-Universities

== Others ==
- Región de Murcia International Airport
- Retail merchandising unit
