= Circuit breaker analyzer =

Instrument that measures the parameters of a circuit breaker

A circuit breaker analyzer is an instrument that measures the parameters of a circuit breaker.

In 1984, Megger patented a digital circuit breaker analyzer, controlled by a microprocessor. in 2020 few companies develop software to control circuit breaker analyzers from different devices such as computers, tablet computer, smartphones and others.

The following tests can be carried out on the circuit breaker: mechanical, thermal, dielectric, short-circuit.

The analyzer operates the circuit breaker under fault current conditions. After finishing the test of the breaker, the system measures currents, voltages and other main parameters of the breaker and through a set algorithm diagnoses the condition of the device under different conditions. The final result of the analysis give information about trip times, essential synchronism of the poles in the different operations of the circuit breaker.

== Measured values ==
- Timing measurements
- Motion measurements
- Coil currents
- Dynamic resistance measurement (DRM)
- Vibration analysis
- Dynamic capacitance measurement
- Static and dynamic resistance measurement
