= Thomas H. Lee (power engineer) =

- 李天和
- Born: May 11, 1923; Shanghai, China
- Died: February 4, 2001 (aged 77); Boston, Massachusetts, US
- Education: National Chiao Tung University; Union College; Rensselaer Polytechnic Institute
- Known for: Developing vacuum interrupter and silicon rectifier
- Awards: IEEE Haraden Pratt Award (1983)
- Scientific career
- Fields: Electrical engineering
- Workplaces: General Electric; Massachusetts Institute of Technology

Thomas H. Lee (Chinese: 李天和; pinyin: Lǐ Tiānhé; May 11, 1923 – February 4, 2001) was a Chinese-American electrical engineer and writer. He worked for General Electric for 30 years, where he developed the first practical vacuum interrupter and the silicon rectifier in the 1960s. In the 1980s he served as the Philip Sporn Professor of Energy Processing at the Massachusetts Institute of Technology and co-chaired the MIT Sloan School's Management of Technology program. He was elected a member of the National Academy of Engineering in 1975 and a foreign member of the Chinese Academy of Engineering in 2000. He was an IEEE Fellow and received the IEEE Haraden Pratt Award in 1983.

== Early life and education ==
Lee was born May 11, 1923, in Shanghai, Republic of China (ROC). He graduated from National Chiao Tung University (now Shanghai Jiao Tong University) in 1946 with a B.S. in mechanical engineering. While in college, he won the doubles gold medal in the Pan-Asia Table Tennis Championship. He enlisted in the Republic of China Army and later joined General Electric in Shanghai.

Lee went to the United States to further his training, and when the Chinese Communist Revolution overthrew the ROC in 1949, he and his wife chose to stay in the U.S. He received his M.S. in electrical engineering from Union College (1950) and his Ph.D. from Rensselaer Polytechnic Institute (1954).

== Career ==
Lee worked for General Electric for 30 years. In the early 1960s, he developed a new copper-bismuth alloy which led to his successful development of practical vacuum interrupters, for which he was granted U.S. patents. In the 1960s, he developed the first silicon rectifier which has since replaced the less reliable mercury-arc rectifier in high-voltage direct current transmission. He held 30 U.S. patents.

Lee taught as an adjunct professor at Rensselaer Polytechnic Institute and a lecturer at the University of Pennsylvania. In 1980, he joined the faculty of the Massachusetts Institute of Technology on the invitation of Gerald L. Wilson, Dean of the School of Engineering. He was appointed the Philip Sporn Professor of Energy Processing in 1982. He served as Director of the Laboratory for Electromagnetic and Electronic Systems and co-chaired the MIT Sloan School's Management of Technology program. He also served as Director of the International Institute of Applied Systems Analysis in Vienna from 1984.

After retiring from MIT in 1988, Lee co-founded the Center for Quality Management (CQM), together with Alex d'Arbeloff and Ray Stata. He served as President of CQM from 1990 to 1998 and became president emeritus afterwards. Joel Moses credits Lee with helping American industry cope with the challenge from Japanese manufacturers.

In 1999 Lee published the book Integrated Management Systems: A Practical Approach to Transforming Organizations, which he co-authored with Shoji Shiba and Robert Chapman Wood. He also wrote Energy After Math, and served as an energy advisor to the government of Finland.

== Honors and recognition ==
Lee was elected a member of the National Academy of Engineering in 1975 for "leadership in better understanding and the advancement of high power switching devices through physics and engineering", and a foreign member of the Chinese Academy of Engineering in 2000. He was an IEEE Fellow and was awarded the IEEE Haraden Pratt Award in 1983 "for meritorious service to the Institute, for the development of the IEEE Energy Committee, and for promoting public understanding of energy issues".

== Personal life ==
He was married to Kin Ping Lee. The couple lived in Boston and had three sons: William, Thomas Jr. and Richard, and eight grandchildren.

Lee died on February 4, 2001, at Massachusetts General Hospital in Boston. He was 77.
