= Selectivity (circuit breakers) =

Selectivity, also known as circuit breaker discrimination, is the coordination of overcurrent protection devices so that a fault in the installation is cleared by the protection device located immediately upstream of the fault. The purpose of selectivity is to minimize the impact of a failure on the network. Faults in an installation are, for example, overload and short circuit.

There are four ways in which selectivity is achieved:

- Current selectivity: different breaking capacities
- Time selectivity: time delay before tripping of a breaker
- Energy based selectivity: analysis of the current waves
- Zone selective interlocking: communication between the breakers, forwarding a time delay instruction
