= Federal Pacific Electric Corporation =

Defunct American electrical manufacturer

Federal Pacific Electric was an electrical products manufacturer based in Newark, New Jersey, US. It was one of the "big 5" electrical equipment manufacturers in the United States in the mid-20th century.

Its offices were at 150 Avenue L at Herbert Street in Newark, New Jersey. It had many satellite locations, including sales and manufacturing plants throughout the United States, and some in partnership overseas.

The company, in its earliest form as Federal Electric, a lighted sign company, was founded in 1901. It later made home and kitchen appliances, neon signs, police sirens, and circuit-breakers. Everything but circuit-breakers had been spun off or sold off to other companies by the 1940s, and the name was changed to Federal Pacific Electric. It continued in this form until the 1980s, when it was absorbed by Reliance Electric, which was purchased shortly thereafter by Exxon.

Federal Pacific is best-known for a line of circuit breaker equipment called Stab-Lok. These circuit breakers and electrical panels were used extensively in residential and commercial construction from about 1951. The product design was flawed and had a high failure rate, which was initially discovered by Reliance Electric engineers when Reliance purchased Federal Pacific.

== Timeline ==
- 1901: Federal Electric Company founded in Chicago by John Gilchrist, James Gilchrist, and John Goehst, making electrically luminated store signs.
- 1902–1909: Insull's utilities group gained control of the company, expanding it to manufacture goods that increase demand for electrical generation and supply. Products include washing machines, vacuum cleaners, and small kitchen appliances.
- 1902–1910: Georges Claude finds a way to produce large quantities of neon gas for industrial use. The production of neon signs, superior to Federal Electric's incandescent-lit signs, becomes viable.
- 1915: The signs division starts producing sirens.
- 1927: Federal Electric organizes Claude Neon Federal Companies division to sell neon advertising nationwide. They own many of the United States patents for the signs.
- 1929: Spins off Claude Neon to competitor Rainbow Luminous Products, the other regional licensee of Georges Claude's patents. (At least one other Claude licensee remains independent, in California.)
- 1930s: Remainder of sign and sirens division spun off from Commonwealth Edison (Insull) as independent company Federal Sign and Signals Corporation, which was renamed to Federal Signals Corporation in 1975.
- 1946: Canadian subsidiary Pioneer Electric formed in Manitoba.
- 1948: Reduces size and employment of Hartford, Connecticut facility, a legacy Federal Electric plant.
- 1949: Federal Electric Company patents a new type of circuit breaker panel.
- 1950: Registers STAB-LOK trademark in the United States.
- 1951: Begins marketing the Stab-Lok line of panels and breakers under the Federal Electric Products (FEP) name. Note: It is unclear whether Federal Pacific bought FEP, or was a name change, or a successor company. It appears to be a name change, with "Federal (Pacific) Electric Company" appearing as the name in several newspaper reports.
- 1952: Affiliated US company Federal Electric Products (FEP) registers the STAB-LOK trademark in Canada. FEP was later absorbed into the parent company.
- 1954: Opens Scranton, Pennsylvania factory. Executive offices at 50 Paris Street in Newark. Spins off sign and siren division as a separate company. James Gilchrist retires from the new Federal Sign and Signal Corporation, dies the following year.
- 1957: In December purchases Roller-Smith, an electrical distribution and measuring device manufacturer located in South Bethlehem, Pennsylvania. It dates to the 1908 consolidation of the local Switchboard Equipment Company and the Whitney Electrical Instrument Company of Penacook, New Hampshire. Roller-Smith plant is closed and operations move to existing Federal Pacific plant in Scranton.
- 1958: Maintains 14 factories and 70 sales offices. The Eastern Division of the company has four plants between Newark and Scranton.
- 1959: Consolidated engineering in Newark, eliminating Scranton research.
- 1960: Consolidates control of Cornell-Dubilier Electric Company 1960, a move engineered by the presidents of the two companies, Thomas M. Cole and Octave Blake. Cole is a youthful executive, a member of the family that owned Cole Electrical Products of Long Island City. The Cole family invested heavily in their supplier, leading to Thomas Cole joining the company. The firm is involved in a price-fixing antitrust scandal with the other "big 5" electrical equipment manufacturers and dozens of smaller manufacturers.
- 1962: Cornell-Dubilier manufacturing moves to the Newark plant; South Plainfield plant closed.
- 1964: Expanded to 22 United States plants with plans to open a 23rd. There are four plants in Europe and one in Australia. Frank H. Roby is president of the company. Expansion to Mexico. Canadian subsidiary Pioneer Electric name changed to FPE-Pioneer.
- 1965: An executive shuffle takes place. Frank Roby leaves and is replaced by chairman Thomas Cole. Roby was responsible for the Cornell-Dubillier unit, which is now headed by Glenn E. Ronk. Italian partner Sace has its president, Leopold Ferre, named to Federal Pacific's board.
- 1970: U. S. Smelting buys Federal Pacific. The company's formal name is United States Smelting, Refining and Mining Company.
- 1972: Parent company U. S. Smelting renames itself to UV Industries.
- 1976: UV Industries appoints Harry E. Knudosn president of its Federal Pacific Electric Company subsidiary.
- 1979: Reliance Electric buys Federal Pacific Electric from UV Industries for US$345 million in March. UV Industries liquidates its remaining assets to avoid a large capital gains tax assessment on the sale. Its largest shareholder files suit to block the plans, but they are ultimately consummated.
- 1980: Reliance Electric engineers identify flaws in the Stab-Lok line in June, and halts distribution of the product in July. The devices are listed as meeting Underwriter Laboratories (UL) specifications, but fail some UL-specified tests. Reliance files suit in federal court to undo the sales or to receive $450 million in damages.
- 1983: Investigation completed by the Consumer Products Safety Commission (CPSC) finds that there is no demonstrated danger from Stab-Lok devices, despite the fudged data used to gain UL approval, and instances where at mild overloads the breaker would not trip. A 2011 updated version of the investigation report clarifies that CPSC did not find them safe, and could not prove they were either safe or unsafe.
- 1984: Lawsuit settled with UV Industries' successor paying $39 million to Reliance after several false starts in 1981 and 1982. Previously-reached agreements were renegotiated after completion of an investigation into Stab-Lok by the Consumer Products Safety Commission.
- 1986: Reliance Federal Pacific exits the circuit breaker business. It sells Federal's Newark plant and changes the Federal name to Challenger Electric. Challenger moves the plant from Newark to Linden, resells the plant to Westinghouse, and sells the remainder of the circuit-breaker company to American Circuit Break Corporation (ACBC). Challenger sells the non-circuit breaker parts of the business to Electro-Mechanical Corporation, which becomes the sole remaining commercial marketer using the Federal Pacific name.
- 1988: FPE-Pioneer sold to Schneider Electric Canada.
- 1993: ACBC stops manufacturing, and instead contracts with Schneider to manufacture Federal products (black circuit-breakers). Schneider may only sell independently in Canada (gray circuit-breakers).
- 1995: Cutler-Hammer, which had bought the Linden plant form Westinghouse, decides to close the plant. The plant manager, John Cifrodella, forms Federal Pacific Equipment, buys the plant and remaining stock, and continues to manufacture and sell circuit-breakers.
- 2007: Circuit Breaker Sales Company (CBS) purchases all assets from Federal Pacific Equipment, including the plant, inventory, and documentation. Everything is moved to the CBS site in Mathews, North Carolina.
