= Motor control center =

Assembly to control a series of electric motors from one location

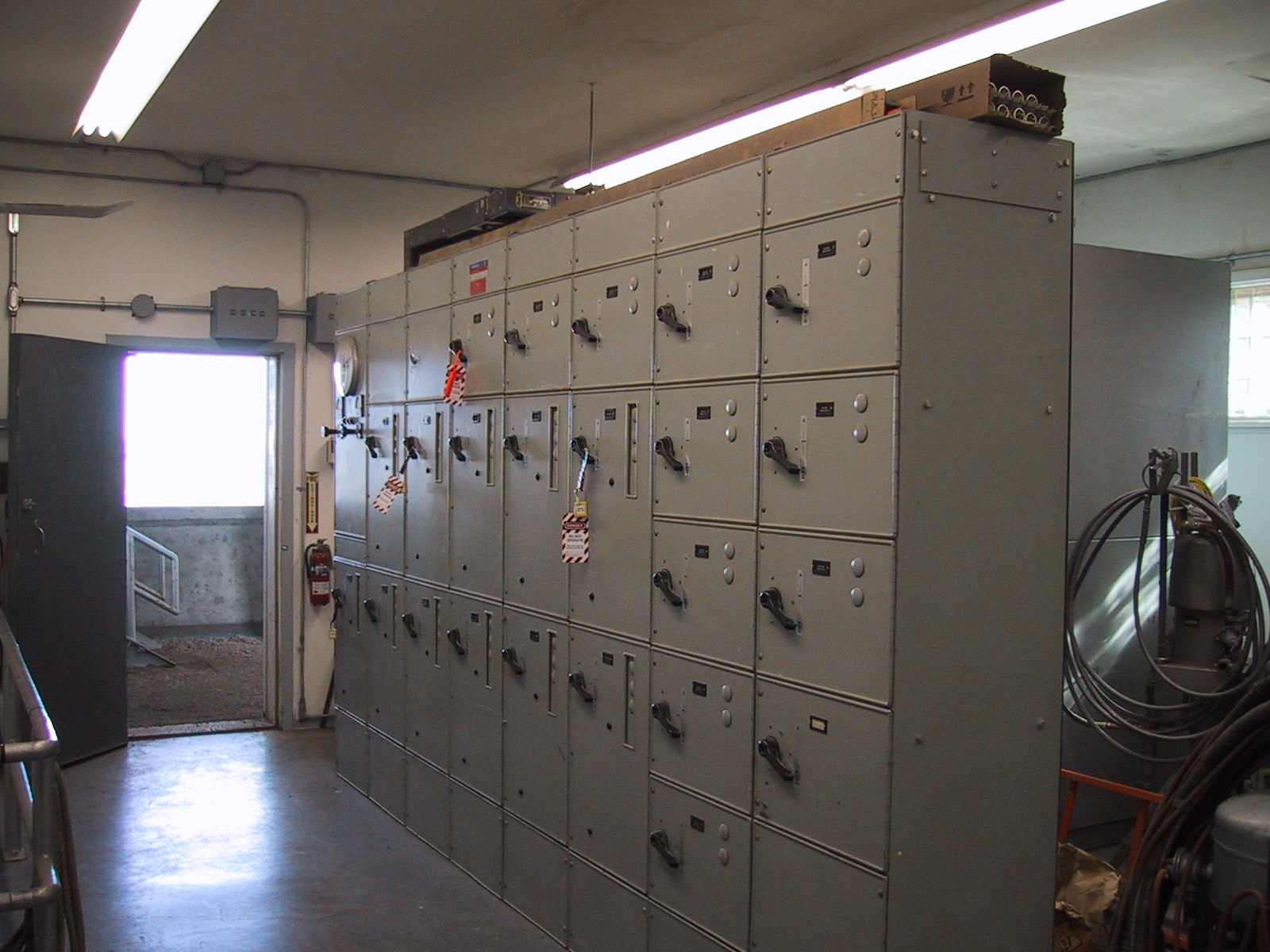
A small, early 1960s-vintage motor control center for 480 volt motors.

A motor control center (MCC) is an assembly to control some or all electric motors in a central location. It consists of multiple enclosed sections having a common power bus and with each section containing a combination starter, which in turn consists of motor starter, fuses or circuit breaker, and power disconnect. A motor control center can also include push buttons, indicator lights, variable-frequency drives, programmable logic controllers, and metering equipment. It may be combined with the electrical service entrance for the building.

MCC's are typically found in large commercial or industrial buildings where there are many electric motors that need to be controlled from a central location, such as a mechanical room or electrical room.

== Voltage ranges ==
Motor control centers are usually used for low voltage three-phase alternating current motors from 220V to 600 V. Medium-voltage motor control centers are made for large motors running at 2300 V to around 15000 V, using vacuum contactors for switching and with separate compartments for power switching and control.

== Usage ==
Motor control centers have been used since 1950 by the automobile manufacturing industry which used large numbers of electric motors. Today they are used in many industrial and commercial applications. Where very dusty or corrosive processes are used, the motor control center may be installed in a separate air-conditioned room, but often an MCC will be on the factory floor adjacent to the machinery controlled.

== Components ==
A motor control center consists of one or more vertical metal cabinet sections with power bus and provision for plug-in mounting of individual motor controllers. Very large controllers may be bolted in place but smaller controllers can be unplugged from the cabinet for testing or maintenance. Each motor controller contains a contactor or a solid-state motor controller, overload relays to protect the motor, fuses or a circuit breaker to provide short-circuit protection, and a disconnecting switch to isolate the motor circuit. Three-phase power enters each controller through separable connectors. The motor is wired to terminals in the controller. Motor control centers provide wire ways for field control and power cables.

== Specifications ==
Each motor controller in an MCC can be specified with a range of options such as separate control transformers, pilot lamps, control switches, extra control terminal blocks, various types of thermal or solid-state overload protection relays, or various classes of power fuses or types of circuit breakers. A motor control center can either be supplied ready for the customer to connect all field wiring, or can be an engineered assembly with internal control and interlocking wiring to a central control terminal panel board or programmable controller.

== Fire protection ==
Motor control centers usually sit on floors, which are often required to have a fire-resistance rating. Firestops may be required for cables that penetrate fire-rated floors and walls.

== See also ==
- Power distribution center
- Transformer
- Switchgear
- Motor controller
- APFC
