= Hybrid switchgear module =

A hybrid switchgear is one that combines the components of traditional air-insulated switchgear (AIS) and SF_{6} gas-insulated switchgear (GIS) technologies. It is characterized by a compact and modular design, which encompasses several different functions in one module.

== Concept ==
High-voltage switchgears have been traditionally distinguished according to the medium used to extinguish the arc. In the case of the hybrid switchgear modules, this device developed during last 90’s uses two different types of technologies: one to extinguish the arc and the other to connect to the other equipment of the high voltage substation, for pursuing the goal of maximizing the advantages of the already existing technologies. The hybrid module typically utilizes gas-insulated switchgear components and conventional air-insulated bushings for connecting to the busbar.

== Components ==
The term module refers to the fact that the equipment itself is a combination of different standard substation components in a single assembly. The integration allows to reduce the overall substation footprint from 50% to more than 70% when compared to substation realized using conventional air insulated equipment.
An hybrid module can incorporate:

- One (or more) circuit breaker
- One (or more) disconnector and earthing switch
- Gas-insulated voltage transformers
- Cast-resin current transformers
- Air- or gas-insulated surge arresters

The high voltage live parts (circuit breaker, disconnector and earthing switch) are encapsulated in a grounded aluminum tank, filled with pressurized sulfur hexafluoride (SF_{6}) gas, which means that the disconnector contacts will likely not require any maintenance during the product life, thus increasing the availability of the substation and the safety of the operators.

== Substation applications ==
This modular approach to the construction of the substations is based on flexibility and customizability. The hybrid module can be used for extension or substitution in any traditional substation which uses an air-insulated busbar. This allows to configure the module with the components that are required by substation’s architecture and scope of supply. Vice versa, it is also possible to install traditional air-insulated equipment in a hybrid substation.
