= Ring main unit =

Component in an electric power distribution system

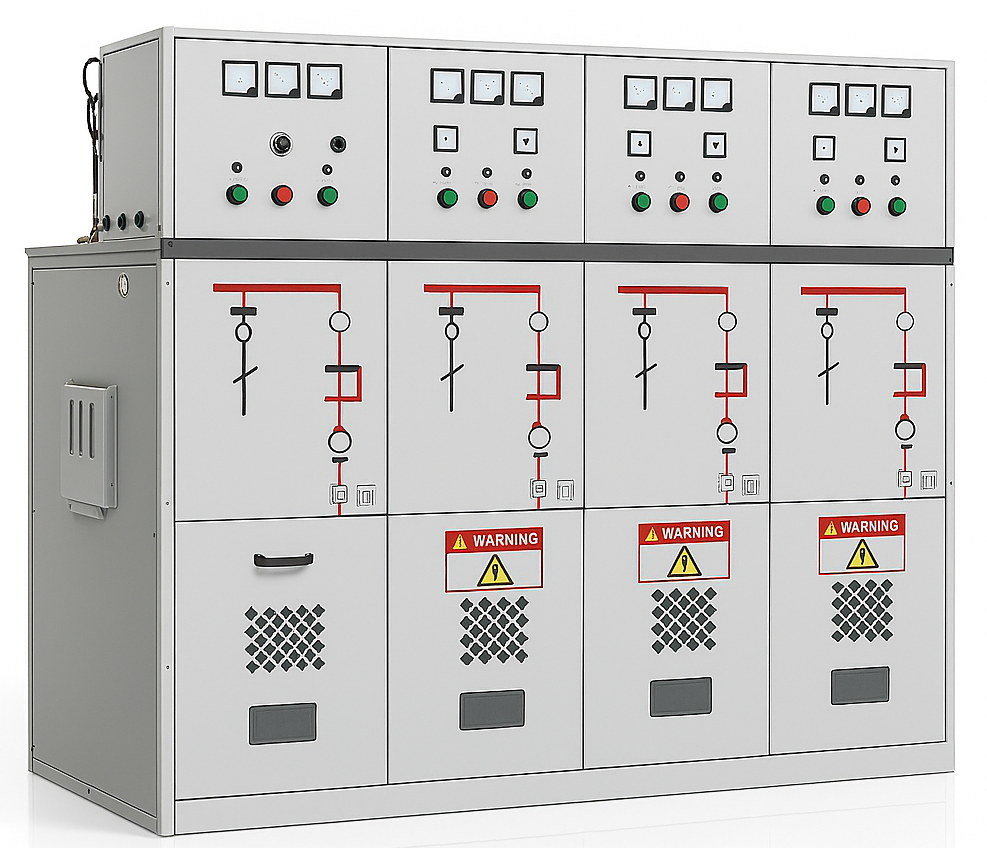
Ring main unit

In an electric power distribution system, a ring main unit (RMU) is a factory assembled, metal enclosed set of switchgear used at the load connection points of a ring-type distribution network. It includes in one unit two switches that can connect the load to either or both main conductors, and a fusible switch or circuit breaker and switch that feed a distribution transformer. The metal enclosed unit connects to the transformer either through a bus throat of standardized dimensions, or else through cables and is usually installed outdoors. Ring main cables enter and leave the cabinet. This type of switchgear is used for medium-voltage power distribution, from 7200 volts to about 36000 volts.

The ring main unit was introduced in the United Kingdom and is now widely used in other countries. In North American distribution practice, often the equivalent of a ring main unit is built into a pad-mounted transformer which integrates switches and transformer into a single cabinet.

== Categories ==
Ring main units can be characterized by their type of insulation: air, oil or gas. The switch used to isolate the transformer can be a fusible switch, or may be a circuit breaker using vacuum or gas-insulated interrupters. The unit may also include protective relays to operate the circuit breaker on a fault.

== See also ==
- Ring circuit
