= Thermal cutoff =

Electrical safety device

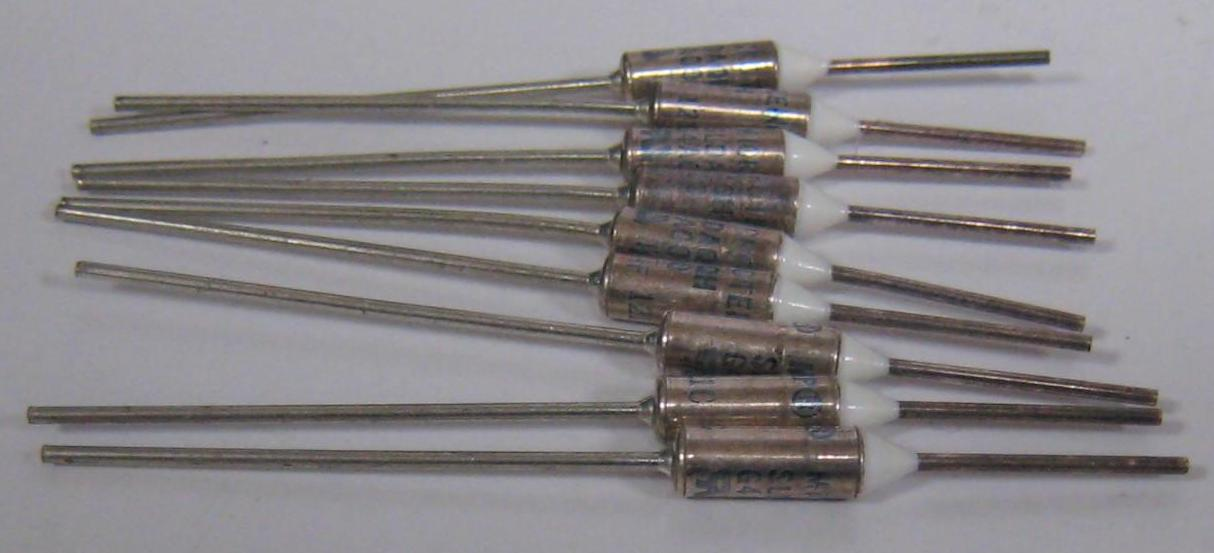
An assortment of thermal fuses

A thermal cutoff is an electrical safety device (either a thermal fuse or thermal switch) that interrupts electric current when heated to a specific temperature. These devices may be for one-time use (a thermal fuse), or may be reset manually or automatically (a thermal switch).

== Thermal fuse ==
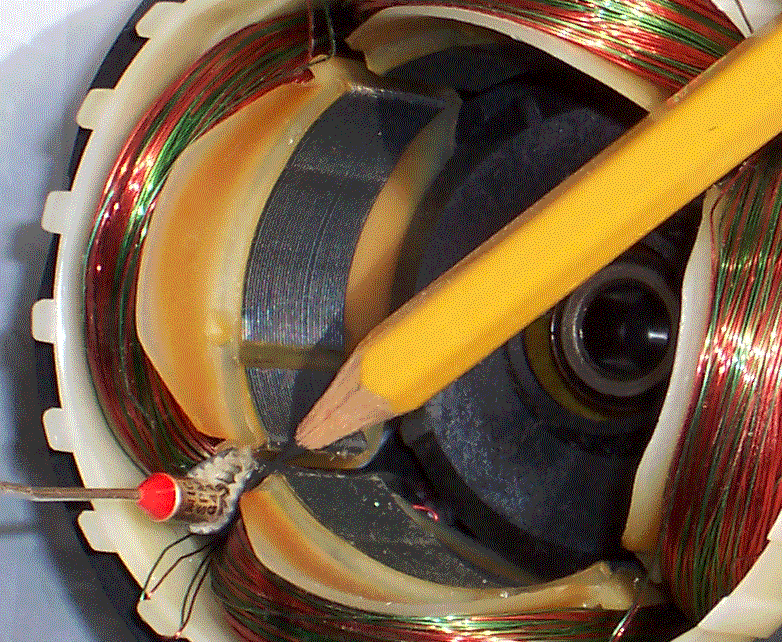
A thermal fuse protecting the windings of a small motor

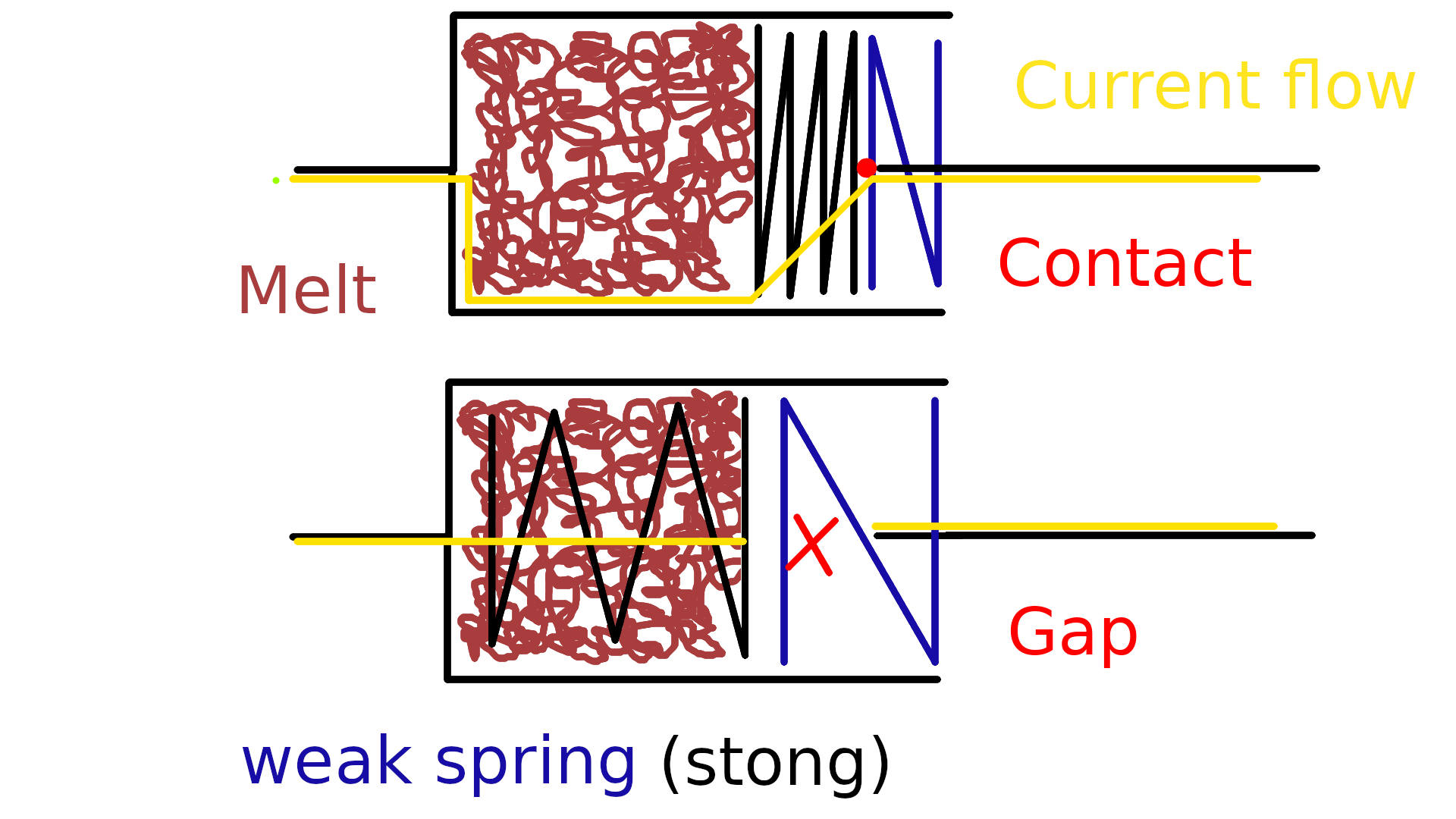
Thermal fuse works like that: Melt gets too hot, strong spring sinks into melted substance, weak spring opens circuit. (Weak spring sits on ceramic insulator.

A thermal fuse is a cutoff which uses a one-time fusible link. Unlike a thermal switch which may automatically reset itself when the temperature drops, the thermal fuse is more like an electrical fuse: a single-use device that cannot be reset and must be replaced when it fails or is triggered. A thermal fuse is used when the overheating is a result of a rare occurrence, such as failure requiring repair (which would also replace the fuse) or replacement at the end of service life.

One mechanism is a small meltable pellet that holds down a spring. When the pellet melts, the spring is released, separating the contacts and breaking the circuit. The Tamura LE series, NEC Sefuse SF series, Microtemp G4A series, and Hosho Elmwood D series, for example, may use thermoplastic pellets that lose strength or melt at specific temperature.

Another mechanism is more similar to an electrical fuse, a fusible element that melts when subjected to temperature above its threshold. The difference from the electrical fuse is in using the surrounding temperature, instead of the temperature generated by ohmic heating of the fusible element. The elements are conductive and usually consist of binary or ternary fusible alloy of tin, bismuth, antimony, indium, lead, and other metals.

Thermal fuses are usually found in heat-producing electrical appliances such as coffeemakers and hair dryers. They function as safety devices to disconnect the current to the heating element in case of a malfunction (such as a defective thermostat) that would otherwise allow the temperature to rise to dangerous levels, possibly starting a fire.

Unlike electrical fuses or circuit breakers, thermal fuses only react to excessive temperature and not to excessive current (unless the excessive current is sufficient to cause the thermal fuse itself to heat up to the trigger temperature). For example, in a surge protector thermal fuses may be wired in series with the varistors; when the varistors conduct, the fuse heats up and disconnects the power, which eliminates the risk of fire which can occur when the varistors are overloaded.

== Thermal switch ==
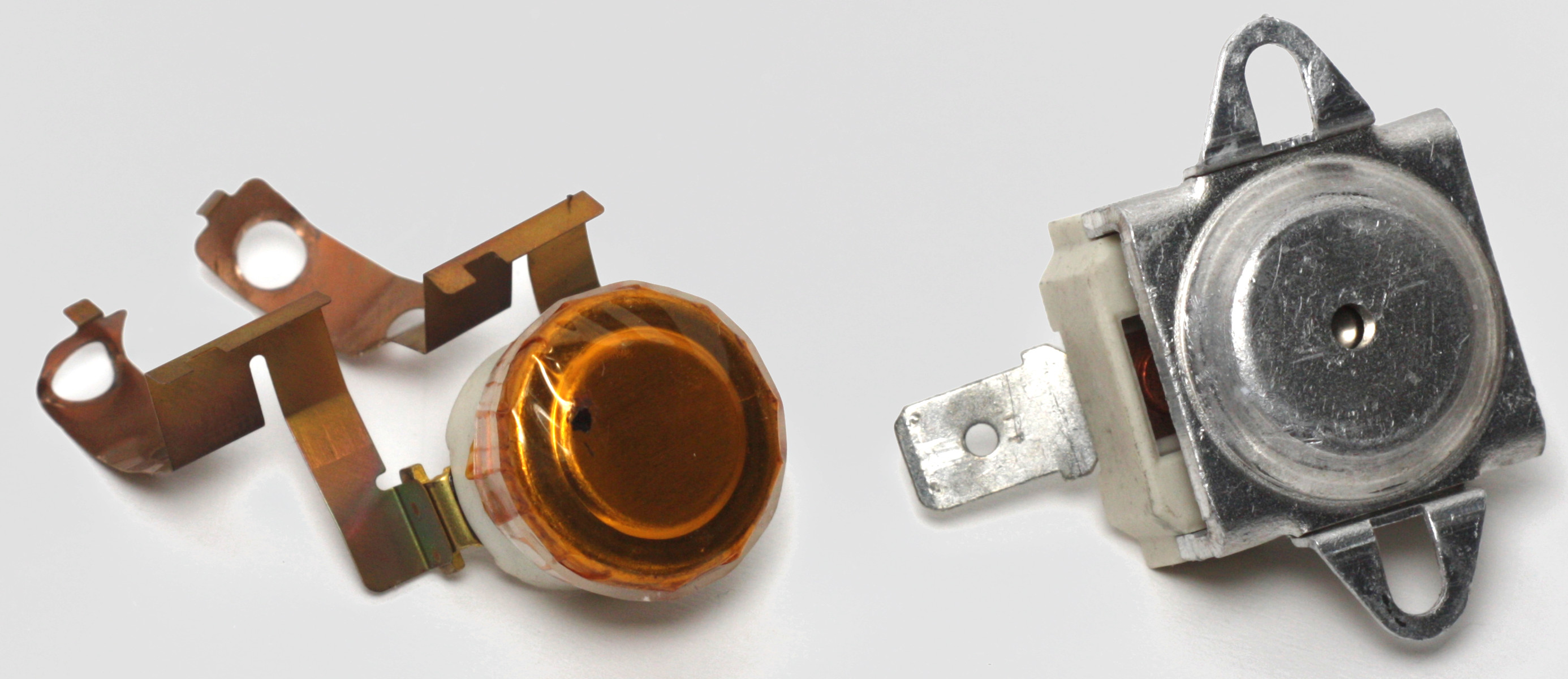
Two thermal switches (Thermal Cut)

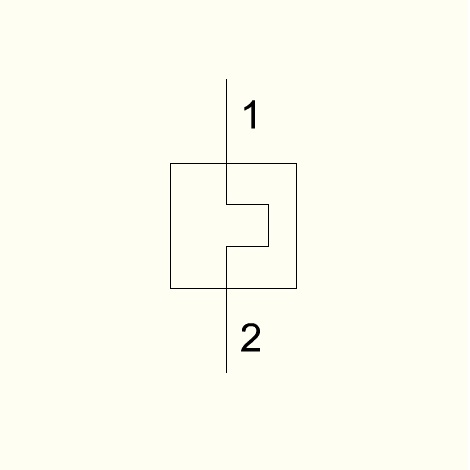
Schematic symbol for a thermal overload switch

A thermal switch, thermal reset or thermal cutout (TCO) is a device which normally opens at a high temperature (often with a faint "plink" sound) and re-closes when the temperature drops. The thermal switch may be a bimetallic strip, often encased in a tubular glass bulb to protect it from dust or short circuit. Another common design uses a bimetallic shallow dome-shaped cap which "clicks" to an inside-out inverted cap shape when heated, such as the "Klixon" brand of thermal cutouts.

Unlike a thermal fuse, a thermal switch is usually reusable and is therefore suited to protecting against temporary situations which are common and user-correctable. Thermal switches are used in power supplies in case of overload, and also as thermostats, and overheat protection in some heating and cooling systems. They are found in virtually every refrigerator, microwave, clothes dryer, space heater, and many more appliances found throughout the home.

Another type of thermal switch is a PTC (Positive Temperature Coefficient) thermistor; these thermistors have a "cutting off" temperature at which the resistance suddenly rises rapidly, limiting the current through the circuit. When used in conjunction with a thermistor relay, the PTC will switch off an electrical system at a desired temperature. Typical use is for motor overheat protection. These devices are not a true “switch” as they do not disengage completely and there is always some resistance across the switch.

Thermal switches are included in turn signals on older vehicles, some light fixtures, particularly with recessed lights, where excessive heat is most likely to occur. This may lead to "cycling" (flashing), where a light turns off and back on every few minutes. Flashing incandescent Christmas lights take advantage of this effect. Some flasher bulbs interrupt power when heated, while other twinkle/sparkle mini-bulbs momentarily shunt current around the filament.

Thermal switches are part of the normal operation of older fluorescent light fixtures, where they are the major part of the starter module.

GE trademarked the name "Guardette" for the thermal protection switches used on their refrigeration compressors.

Thermal switches on microprocessors often stop only the fetching of instructions to execute, reducing the clock rate to zero until a lower temperature is reached, while maintaining power to the cache to prevent data loss (although a second switch, with a higher triggering temperature, usually turns off even the cache and forces the computer to reboot). This mitigates the impact of programs resembling power viruses on the processor's longevity, while still accommodating their possible legitimate uses; it can also make overclocking possible with less risk.

=== Manual reset ===
Some thermal switches must be reset manually after having tripped. This type is used when an automatic and unattended restart would create a hazardous condition, such as sudden startup of a powerful motor without warning. These types of thermal cutouts are usually reset by pressing a push-button by hand or with a special tool.

== See also ==
- Thermistor
- Resettable fuse
