= Automotive fuse =

Class of fuses used to protect the wiring and electrical equipment for vehicles

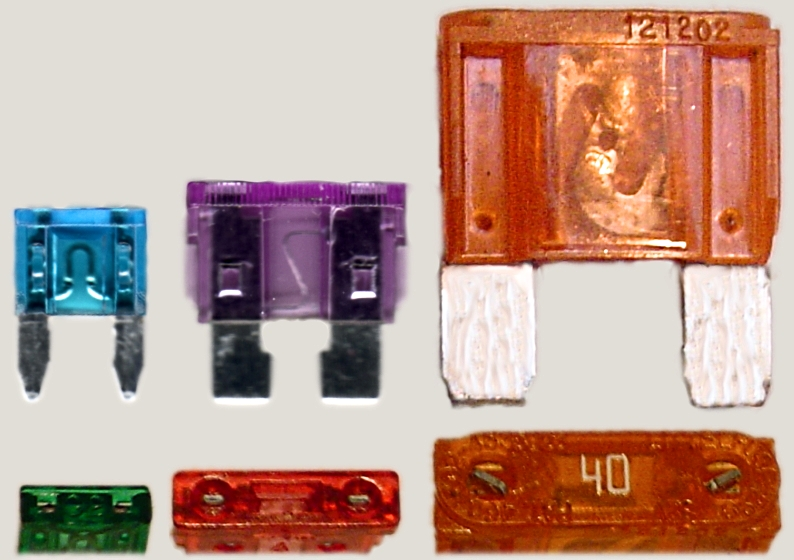
Mini / regular / maxi blade-type automotive fuses, side and top views. The top metal surfaces can be tested using multimeter probes.

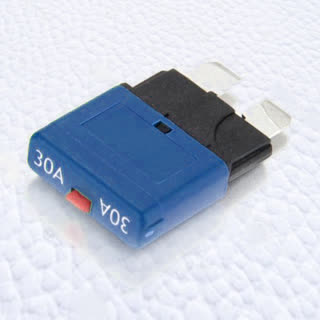
Automobile electrical circuit breaker with resettable switch

Automotive fuses are a class of fuses used to protect the wiring and electrical equipment for motor vehicles. They are generally rated for circuits no higher than 32 volts direct current, but some types are rated for 42-volt electrical systems. They are occasionally used in non-automotive electrical products. Automotive fuses are typically housed inside one or more fuse boxes (also called an integrated power module (IPM)) within the vehicle, typically on one side of the engine compartment and/or under the dash near the steering wheel. Some fuses or circuit breakers may nonetheless be placed elsewhere, such as near the cabin fan or air bag controller. They also exist as circuit breakers that are resettable using a switch.

There may be a fuse for ignition off draw (IOD), which controls the drawing of electric current in a vehicle while it is shut off; removing this fuse while the vehicle is shut off for more than a few weeks will prevent excessive depletion of the battery.

== Blade type ==
Blade type fuses come in six physical sizes: Micro2, Micro3, low-profile (LP) Mini, Mini, Regular, Maxi

Blade fuses (also called spade or plug-in fuses), with a plastic body and two prongs that fit into sockets, are mostly used in automobiles. Other common usage is in equipment with comparatively simple, low voltage DC electrical systems such as towed campers and marine applications such as sailboats and motor boats (typically smaller cabin cruisers).

Each fuse is printed with the rated current in amperes on the top.

These types of fuses come in six different physical dimensions:

- Micro2.
- Micro3.
- LP-mini (APS), also known as low-profile mini. Unofficially, the "low-profile mini" fuse is sometimes incorrectly called "Micro" since the term means smaller than mini, but recently fuses using the Micro name have been released.
- Mini (APM / ATM). The mini fuses were developed in the 1990s.
- Regular (APR / ATC / ATO / ATS) blade-type fuses, also known as standard, were developed in 1976 as ATO by Littelfuse for low voltage use in motor vehicles. Bussmann makes the ATC that also complies with the same ISO 8820-3 and SAE J1284 standards. OptiFuse, a newer entrant in the market, makes regular (APR / ATC / ATO) fuses that meet the same standards.
- Maxi (APX), heavy-duty.

=== Mount ===
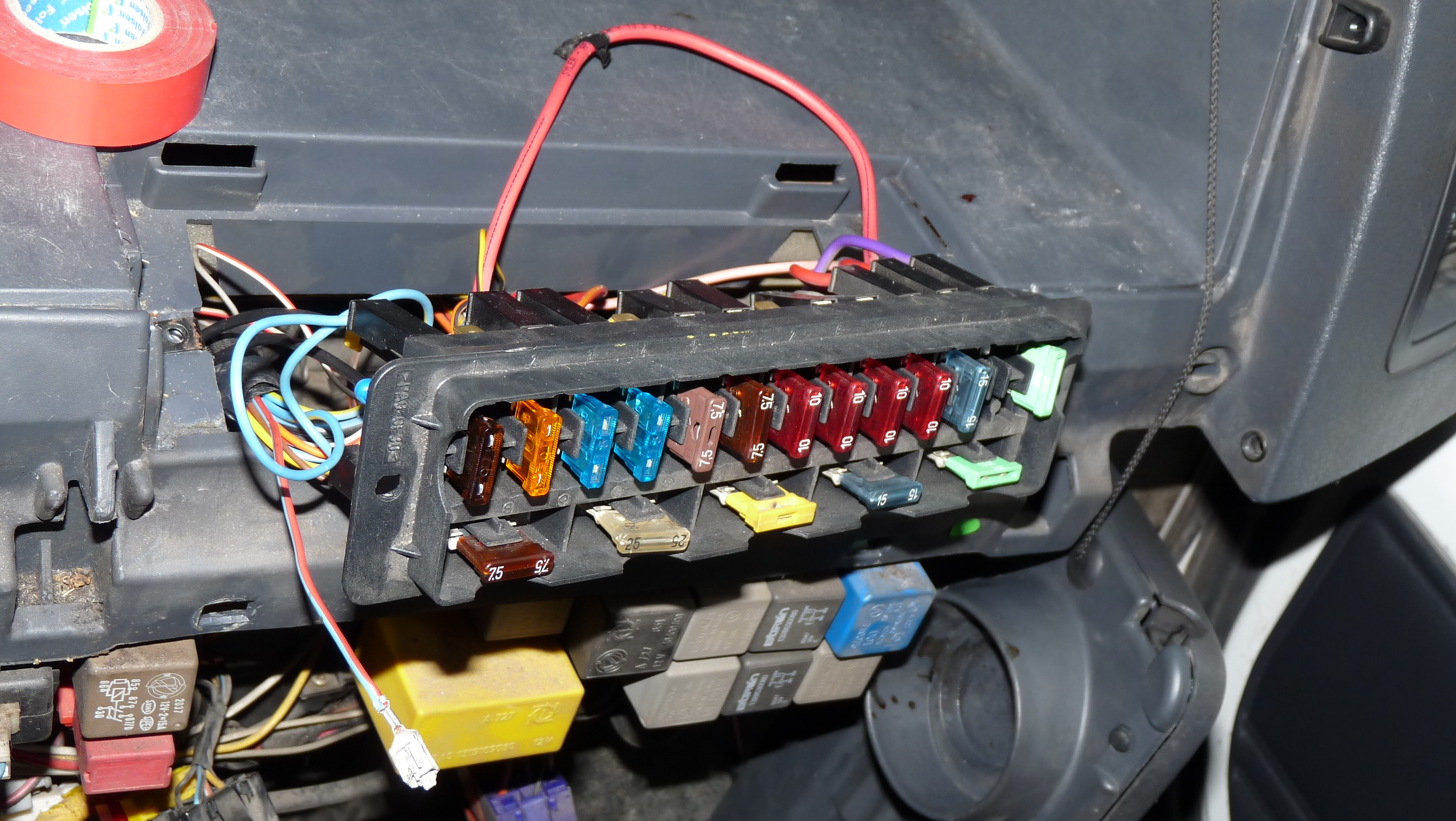
Blade fuse holder on Citroën Jumper

Blade type fuses can be mounted in:

- Fuse blocks (made of porcelain, slate, or other refractory material).
- In-line fuse holders
- Dual slot fuse holders
- Fuse clips.

=== Size groups ===
| Blade size | Blade group | Dimensions L × W × H | Common ratings (maximum current) |
|---|---|---|---|
| Micro2 | APT, ATR | 9.1 × 3.8 × 15.3 mm | 5, 7.5, 10, 15, 20, 25, 30 |
| Micro3 | ATL | 14.4 × 4.2 × 18.1 mm | 5, 7.5, 10, 15 |
| LP-Mini (low profile) | APS, ATT | 10.9 × 3.81 × 8.73 mm | 2, 3, 4, 5, 7.5, 10, 15, 20, 25, 30 |
| Mini | APM, ATM | 10.9 × 3.6 × 16.3 mm | 2, 3, 4, 5, 7.5, 10, 15, 20, 25, 30 |
| Regular | APR, ATC, ATO, ATS | 19.1 × 5.1 × 18.5 mm | 0.5, 1, 2, 3, 4, 5, 7.5, 10, 15, 20, 25, 30, 35, 40 |
| Maxi | APX | 29.2 × 8.5 × 34.3 mm | 20, 25, 30, 35, 40, 50, 60, 70, 80, 100, 120 |

Where space permits, a miniature circuit breaker is sometimes used to replace a blade-type fuse in the same fuse holder.

Blade fuses use a common coloring scheme for the Micro2, Micro3, low-profile (LP) Mini, Mini, and regular size fuses, and a partial color similarity with the maxi size fuses. The following table shows the commonly available fuses for each size group.

| Color | Current rating | Micro2 | Micro3 | LP Mini | Mini | Reg | Maxi |
|---|---|---|---|---|---|---|---|
| Dark blue | 0.5 A | No | No | No | No | Yes | No |
| Black | 1 A | No | No | No | No | Yes | No |
| Grey | 2 A | No | No | Yes | Yes | Yes | No |
| Violet | 3 A | No | No | Yes | Yes | Yes | No |
| Pink | 4 A | No | No | Yes | Yes | Yes | No |
| Tan | 5 A | Yes | Yes | Yes | Yes | Yes | No |
| Brown | 7.5 A | Yes | Yes | Yes | Yes | Yes | No |
| Red | 10 A | Yes | Yes | Yes | Yes | Yes | No |
| Blue | 15 A | Yes | Yes | Yes | Yes | Yes | Yes |
| Yellow | 20 A | Yes | No | Yes | Yes | Yes | Yes |
| Transparent | 25 A | Yes | No | Yes | Yes | Yes | Grey |
| Green | 30 A | Yes | No | Yes | Yes | Yes | Yes |
| Blue-green | 35 A | No | No | Yes | Yes | Yes | Brown |
| Orange | 40 A | No | No | Yes | Yes | Yes | Yes |
| Red | 50 A | No | No | No | No | No | Yes |
| Blue | 60 A | No | No | No | No | No | Yes |
| Amber/tan | 70 A | No | No | No | No | No | Yes |
| Transparent | 80 A | No | No | No | No | No | Yes |
| Violet | 100 A | No | No | No | No | No | Yes |
| Purple | 120 A | No | No | No | No | No | Yes |

Regular fuses (ATO) rated 0.5 A, 35 A and 40 A are not mentioned in the DIN standards, but are available in some products from Littelfuse, among others.

== Cartridge type ==
Several cartridge type fuses are used in automotive applications, including MCASE, MCASE+, JCASE, and low-profile JCASE types.

== Bosch type ==
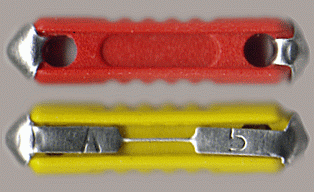
Bosch type fuse (used in older cars)

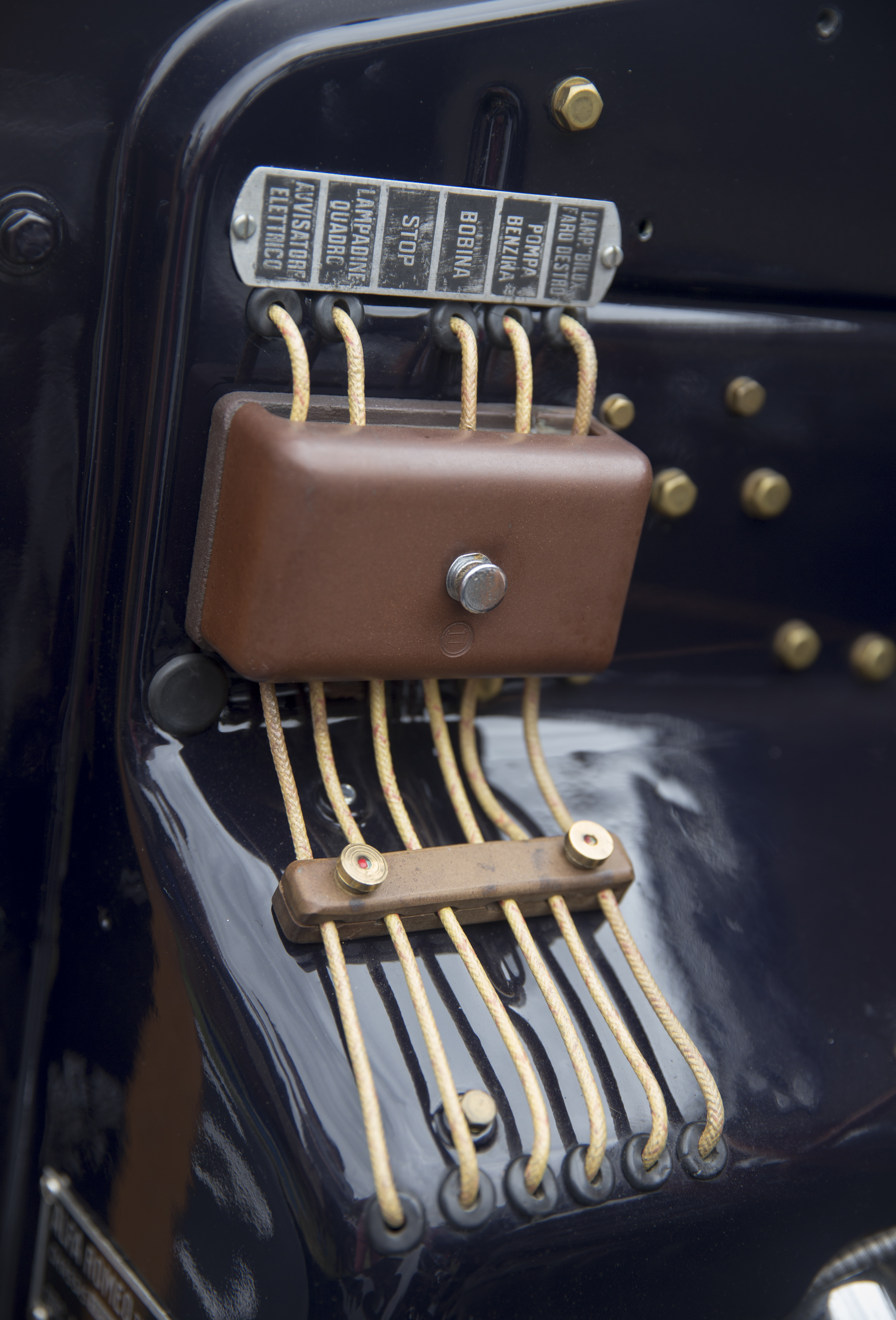
A Bosch fuse box for porcelain fuses in a 1933 Alfa Romeo 6C 1750

Bosch type fuses (also known as ceramic, porcelain, continental, torpedo, European, or GBC type fuses) are used in old (often European) automobiles. The physical dimension of this type of fuse is 6×25 mm with conical ends. Bosch type fuses usually use the same color-coding for the rated current. The DIN standard is 72581/1.

=== Color coding ===
| Color | Current rating |
|---|---|
| Yellow | 5 A |
| White | 8 A |
| Red | 16 A |
| Blue | 25 A |
| Grey | 40 A |

== Lucas type ==
Lucas type fuses are used in old British-made or assembled automobiles. The physical length of the Lucas ceramic type of fuse is either 1 inch or 1.25 inch, with conical ends. Lucas glass tube fuses have straight ends. Lucas type fuses usually use the same color-coding for the rated current. Lucas fuses have three ratings; the continuous current they are designed to carry, the instantaneous current at which they will fuse, and the continuous current at which they will also fuse. The figure found on Lucas fuses is the continuous fusing current which is twice the continuous ampere rating that the system should be using; this can be a source of confusion when replacing Lucas fuses with non Lucas fuses. The Lucas 1/4" diameter glass tube fuse have a different length as compared to the standard US item. The Lucas 1/4" diameter glass tube fuse is 1 5/32 in (29 mm) long, while the US standard 1/4" glass tube fuse is 1 1/4 in (32 mm)] long. However, many Lucas fuse holders permit the longer US version to be installed easily.

=== Color coding ===
| Color | Continuous current, amperes (=rated current) | Instantaneous fusing current, amperes | Continuous fusing current, amperes |
|---|---|---|---|
| Blue | 1.5 | 3.5 | 3 |
| Yellow | 2.25 | 5 | 4.5 |
| Red on yellow | 2.5 | 6 | 5 |
| Green | 3 | 7 | 6 |
| Nut brown | 4 | 10 | 8 |
| Red on green | 5 | 12 | 10 |
| Green on black | 5 | 12 | 10 |
| Red on brown | 6 | 14 | 12 |
| Light brown | 7.5 | 18 | 15 |
| Pink | 12.5 | 30 | 25 |
| White | 17.5 | 40 | 35 |
| Purple on yellow | 25 | 60 | 50 |
| Yellow on red | 30 | 75 | 60 |

== Glass tube type ==
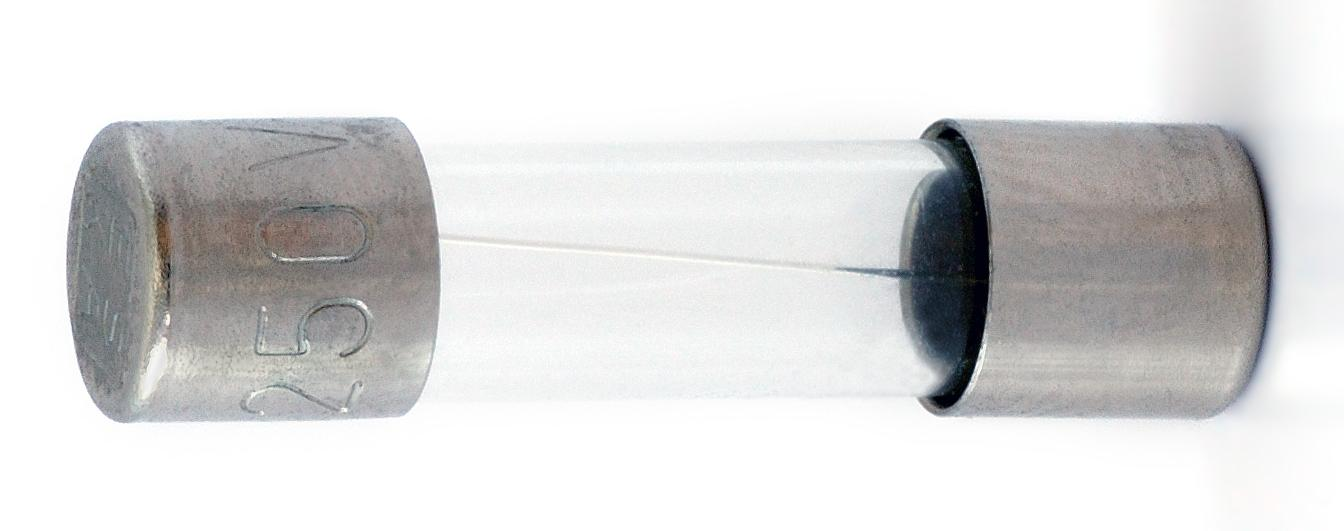
Glass tube type fuse

North-American built automobiles up to at least 1981 had electrical systems protected by cylindrical glass cartridge fuses rated 32 volts DC and current ratings from 4 amperes to 30 amperes. These are known as "SFE" fuses, as they were designed by the Society of Fuse Engineers to prevent the insertion of a grossly inadequate or unsafe fuse into the vehicle's fuse panel. These SFE fuses all have a 1/4 inch diameter, and the length varies according to the rating of the fuse.

| SFE designation | Rated current (A) | Length inches | Notes |
|---|---|---|---|
| SFE 4 | 4 | 5/8 | same length as any AGA rating |
| SFE 6 | 6 | 3/4 | |
| SFE 7.5 | 7.5 | 7/8 | same length as any AGW rating |
| SFE 9 | 9 | 7/8 | same length as any AGW rating |
| SFE 14 | 14 | 1 1/16 | |
| SFE 20 | 20 | 1 1/4 | same length as any AGC rating |
| SFE 30 | 30 | 1 7/16 | |

There are a number of lookalike fuses which can easily be confused with these. In general this type of fuse will have an "AG" label of some kind, which originally stood for "Automobile Glass". or "All Glass" (sources conflict). AG-series fuses are rated for 125 VAC or 250 VAC, while SFE fuses are rated only to 32 V AC or DC and so are not intended for circuits connected to 120 or 250 VAC. There are at least seven different sizes of fuses with a 1/4 inch diameter. The fuses listed are the most common for the size, which is always a fast-acting fuse:

- 1AG size, type AGA, 1 A to 30 A, 1/4 inch (6.4 mm) diameter by 5/8 inch (15.9mm) long
- 2AG size, type AGB, 0.177 in (4.5 mm) diameter by 0.588 in (14.9 mm) long (frequently replaced with 5mm diameter by 15mm long international size fuse (aka 5 x 15mm - now more readily available)
- 3AG size, type AGC, 0.125 A to 50 A, 1/4 inch (6.4 mm) diameter by 1 1/4 inches (32 mm) long
- 4AG size, type AGS, 9/32 inch (7.1 mm) diameter by 1 1/4 inches (32 mm) long
- 5AG size, type AGU, 1 A to 60 A, 13/32 inch (10 mm) diameter by 1 1/2 inches (38 mm) long. Also called midget fuses.
- 7AG size, type AGW, 1 A to 30 A, 1/4 inch (6.4 mm) diameter by 7/8 inch (22 mm) long
- 8AG size, type AGX, 1 A to 30 A, 1/4 inch (6.4 mm) diameter by 1 inch (25 mm) long
- 9AG size, type AGY, 50 A, 1/4 inch (6.4 mm) diameter by 1 7/16 inches (37 mm) long
- UK size, type UK, 35 A to 50 A, 1/4 inch (6.4 mm) diameter by 1 1/4 inches (32 mm) long

These and other fuses are still being manufactured for many applications, including for AC circuits and DC uses. Some are time delayed, slow reacting, or have leads for terminals used in circuits without a fuse holder. Many of the fuse dimensions and characteristics are published by the Society of Automotive Engineers as Standard SAE J 554.

== Limiter type ==
Limiter fuses or fusible links consist of a metal strip for currents over 10 amperes. Also referred to as current limiting fuses, they feature an internal fuse element that melts when current passing through the fuse element is within the specified current limiting range of the fuse. As the fuse element melts, it creates a high resistance to reduce the magnitude and duration of the current flowing through the fuse to protect the electrical circuit and connected equipment. Frequently, these are used in close proximity to starter battery fuse boxes. They are used also in electric vehicles, e.g., in forklift trucks.

== Indicating fuses ==
At least one manufacturer supplies fuses with a built-in lamp that lights when the fusible link has melted. This expedites identification of the blown fuse.

== See also ==
- List of auto parts
