= Cylinder fuse =

Electrical fuse

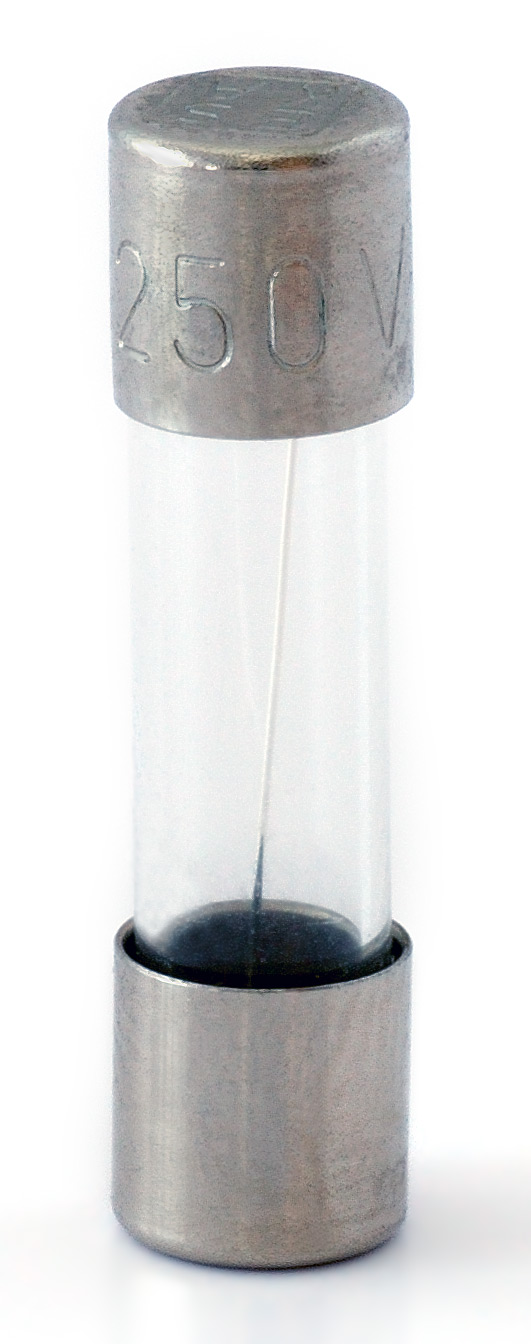

A cylinder fuse is a type of electrical fuse. Like other types of fuses, it is a safety device used to protect electrical devices from excessive current.

As its name suggests, a cylinder fuse is shaped like a cylinder. It has a thin wire or metal alloy strip in the middle, and two metal caps, one on each end, which are used as contacts when it is inserted (in series) into an electrical circuit. The thin wire is designed to melt at a specific temperature which is reached when the circuit is carrying more than the intended amount of electric current. When the wire melts, the circuit is broken and no electricity flows.

Cylinder fuses are used in many types of electrical and electronic devices. Not only do they protect the equipment from danger, but they also prevent dangerous fires caused by overheating of circuits. Once a cylinder fuse has been overheated and the wire has been melted, it no longer functions. After the cause of the excessive current has been remedied, a new fuse must be installed to restore the current through the circuit.
