= Lee Middleman =

American ceramic artist and physicist (born 1944)

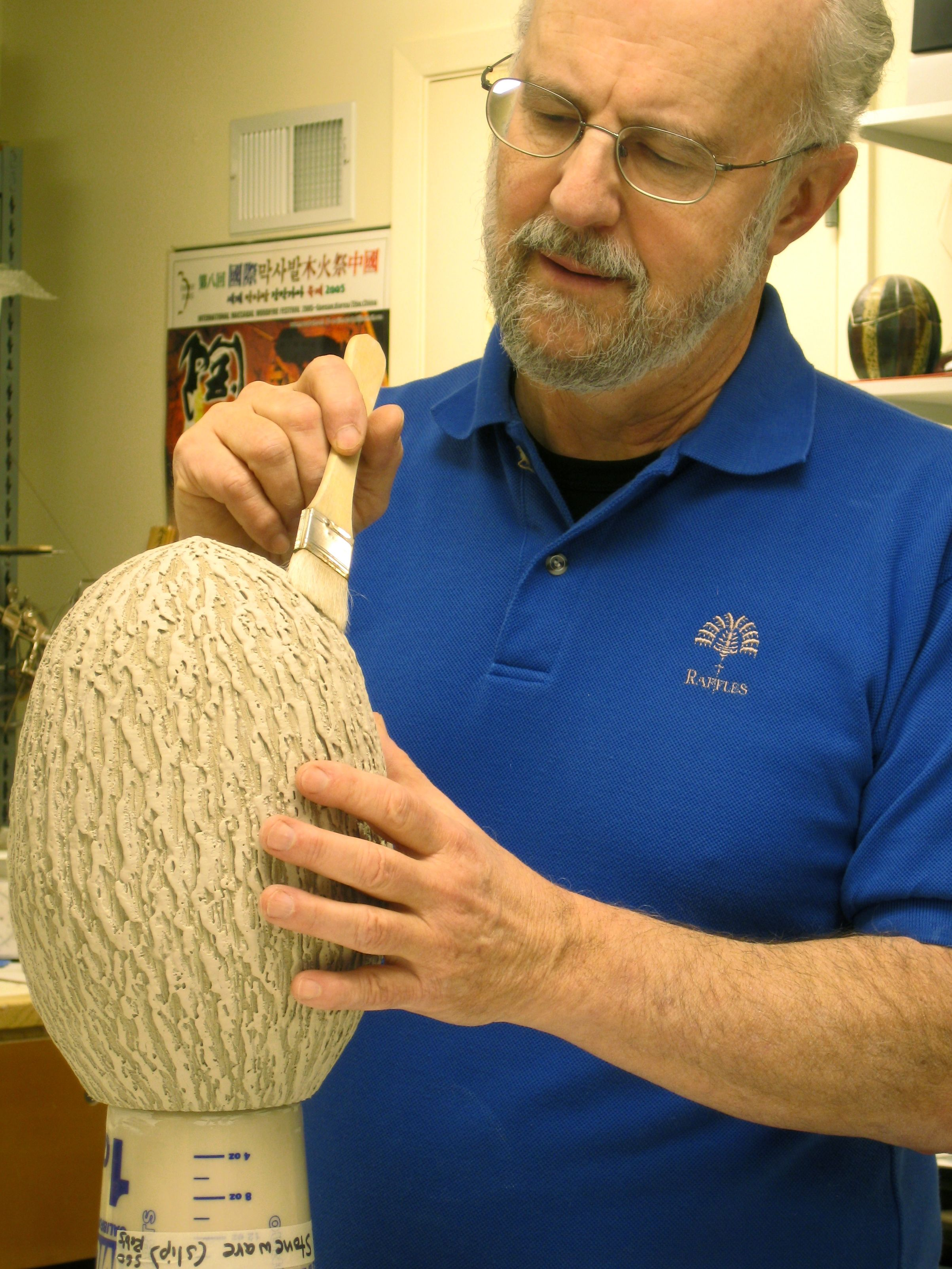
- Born: 1944 (age 81–82); Baltimore, Maryland, United States
- Education: Johns Hopkins University (BA); Stanford University (PhD)
- Occupations: Ceramic artist, physicist
- Organizations: Association of Clay and Glass Artists of California; International Academy of Ceramics; International Ceramic Artists Association
- Known for: Wheel-thrown ceramic vessels with textured surfaces
- Spouse: Donnie Middleman
- Children: 2
- Awards: Woodrow Wilson Fellowship; National Science Foundation Fellowships
- Website: leemiddleman.com

Lee Middleman (born 1944) is an American ceramic artist and physicist. He is a former president of the Association of Clay and Glass Artists of California and an elected member of the International Academy of Ceramics.

== Early life and education ==
Middleman was born in Baltimore, Maryland, in 1944. He attended the Baltimore Polytechnic Institute for high school and later studied physics at Johns Hopkins University, where he earned a Bachelor of Arts degree. He received a Ph.D. in physics from Stanford University. During his graduate studies, he was awarded a Woodrow Wilson Fellowship and several National Science Foundation Fellowships.

== Career ==
After earning his doctorate, Middleman worked for over two decades as a physicist and technology executive in Silicon Valley, holding research and development roles at several technology and medical instrument companies. He played a key role in the commercialization of the resettable fuse, polyswitch devices, and received patents for their design and applications.

In 1999, Middleman changed careers and began studying ceramics at the Palo Alto Art Center and Foothill College. He established a home studio in Portola Valley, California, and began exhibiting his work in 2003. He served as president of the Association of Clay and Glass Artists of California from 2003 to 2005.

Middleman has participated in many national juried competitions and exhibitions. His work has been selected for numerous international competitions including the World Ceramic Biennale in South Korea (2003), the International Ceramic Triennial UNICUM in Slovenia (2018), and the Shanghai International Woodfire Ceramics Festival (2021), where he received a Silver Prize.

Middleman served as president of the Association of Clay and Glass Artists of California from 2003 to 2005 and is board member since 2002. He is a member of the International Academy of Ceramics (Geneva) since 2019.

== Art style ==
Middleman creates simple forms on the potter's wheel and alters their surfaces with impressed patterns or carving. His technique involves pressing handmade tools into the clay walls of a vessel and then expanding the form from the inside, which stretches the impressed design. The method was influenced by the work of Japanese potter Tatsuzō Shimaoka. He applies thin layers of Celadon and other glazes that break over the raised textures of the surface. He also uses specialized glazes to create textures on surfaces. His work is prized as “decorative function style art.”

== Personal life ==
Middleman is married to Donnie, and they have two children.

== Awards and recognition ==
Middleman's work is included in the permanent collections of more than two dozen museums and cultural institutions, including the Yixing Ceramics Museum in China, the National Museum of Slovenia, the American Museum of Ceramic Art in California, and the Icheon World Ceramic Center in Korea.

Middleman has held solo exhibitions in Palo Alto, Seoul, South Korea, and Aomori, Japan. He is a founding member and the North American chair of the International Ceramic Artists Association and was elected to the International Academy of Ceramics in 2019.
