= Fusible link =

Mechanical or electrical safety device

A fusible link is a mechanical or electrical safety device. They are used in fire sprinkler heads to activate the sprinkler in the presence of heat. They are used in automobile electrical systems as a fuse.

== Mechanical fusible link ==
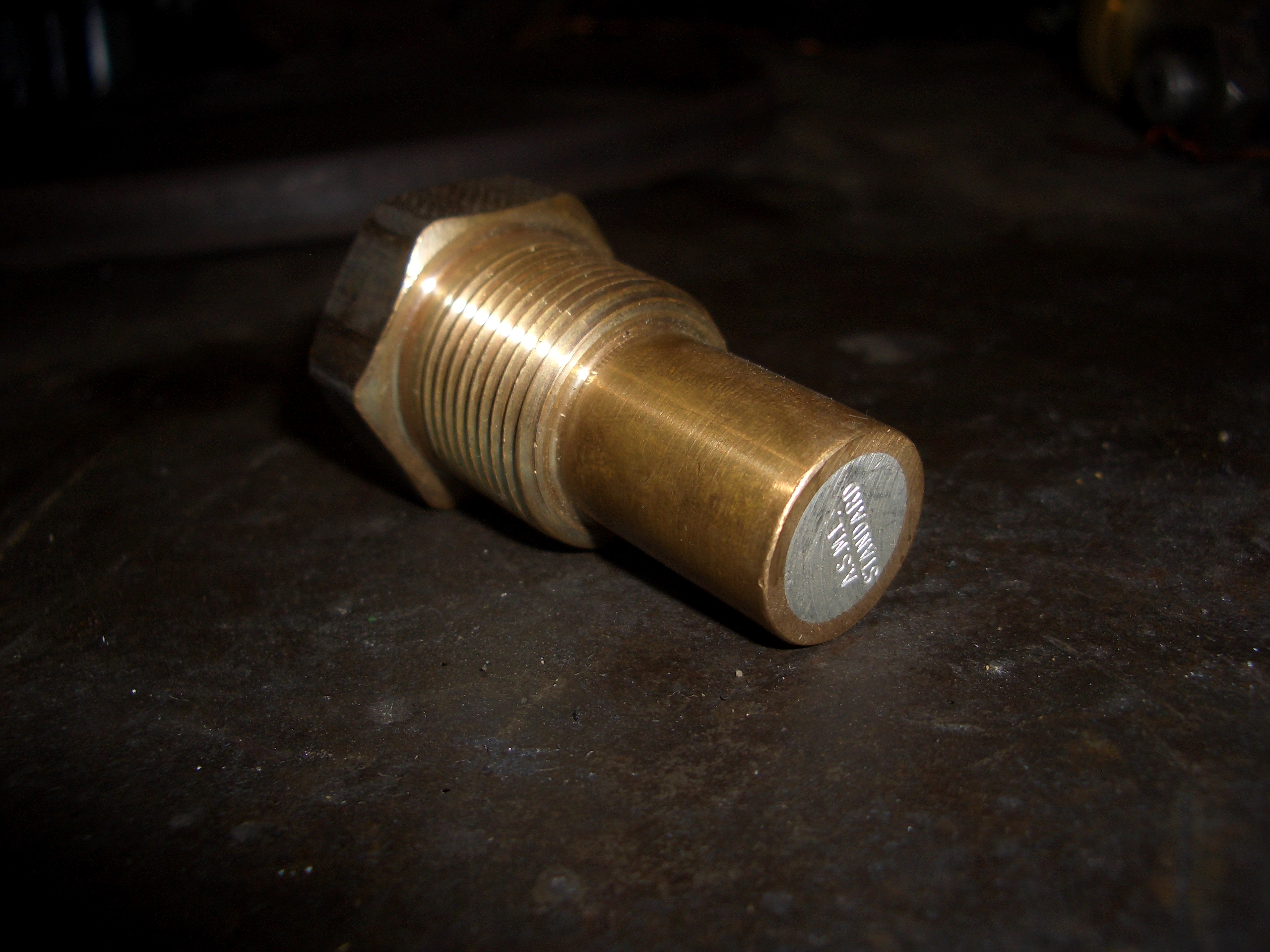
A fusible plug.

A mechanical fusible link is a device consisting of two strips of metal soldered together with a fusible alloy that is designed to melt at a specific temperature, thus allowing the two pieces to separate. Mechanical fusible links are utilized as the triggering device in fire sprinkler systems and mechanical automatic door release mechanisms that close fire doors in warehouses, etc. Fire dampers in ventilation systems have fusible links so that the dampers close automatically in case of fire, limiting the spread of flame or hot gases through a building. Some high-security safes also utilize fusible link-based relockers as a defense against torches and heat-producing tools. Mechanical fusible links come in a variety of designs and different temperature ratings.

== Electrical fusible link ==
An electrical fusible link is a type of electrical fuse that is constructed simply with a short piece of wire typically four American wire gauge (AWG) sizes smaller than the wire that is being protected. For example, an AWG 16 fusible link might be used to protect AWG 12 wiring. Electrical fusible links are common in high-current automotive applications. The wire in an electrical fusible link is encased in high-temperature fire-resistant insulation to reduce hazards when the wire melts.

== See also ==
- Thermal fuse
- Fuse (automotive)
