= Breaking capacity =

Electrical apparatus

Breaking capacity or interrupting rating is the current that a fuse, circuit breaker, or other electrical apparatus is able to interrupt without being destroyed or causing an electric arc with unacceptable duration. The prospective short-circuit current that can occur under short circuit conditions should not exceed the rated breaking capacity of the apparatus, otherwise breaking of the current cannot be guaranteed. The current breaking capacity corresponds to a certain voltage, so an electrical apparatus may have more than one breaking capacity current, according to the actual operating voltage. Breaking current may be stated in terms of the total current or just in terms of the alternating-current (symmetrical) component. Since the time of opening of a fuse or switch is not coordinated with the reversal of the alternating current, in some circuits the total current may be offset and can be larger than the alternating current component by itself. A device may have different interrupting ratings for alternating and direct current.

== Choosing breaking capacity ==
Calculation of the required breaking capacity involves determining the supply impedance and voltage. Supply impedance is calculated from the impedance of the elements making up the supply system. Customers of an electrical supply utility can request the maximum value of prospective short-circuit current available at their point of supply. Networks involving multiple sources of current, such as multiple generators, electric motors, and with variable interconnections may be analyzed with a computer. A system study will generally consider the maximum case of additions of generation and interconnection out to some projected horizon year, to allow for system growth during the useful life of the studied installation. Since practical calculations involve a number of approximations and estimates, some judgment is required in applying the results of a short-circuit calculation to the selection of apparatus. Making capacity i.e. maximum fault current, device can carry, if it is closed in to the fault should be considered.

== Breaking capacities ==
Miniature circuit breakers and fuses may be rated to interrupt as little as 85 amperes and are intended for supplementary protection of equipment, not the primary protection of a building wiring system. In North American practice, approved general-purpose low-voltage fuses must interrupt at least 10,000 amperes. Types used in commercial and industrial low-voltage distribution systems are rated to safely interrupt 200,000 amperes. The rating of power circuit breakers varies according to the application voltage; a circuit breaker that interrupts 50,000 amperes at 208 volts might be rated to interrupt only 10,000 amperes at 600 volts, for example. Direct-current systems such as are typical with batteries are more of a problem than alternating current systems, because in the latter current regularly crosses the zero-point, whereas DC current by definition does not.
