= Resettable fuse =

Electronic component

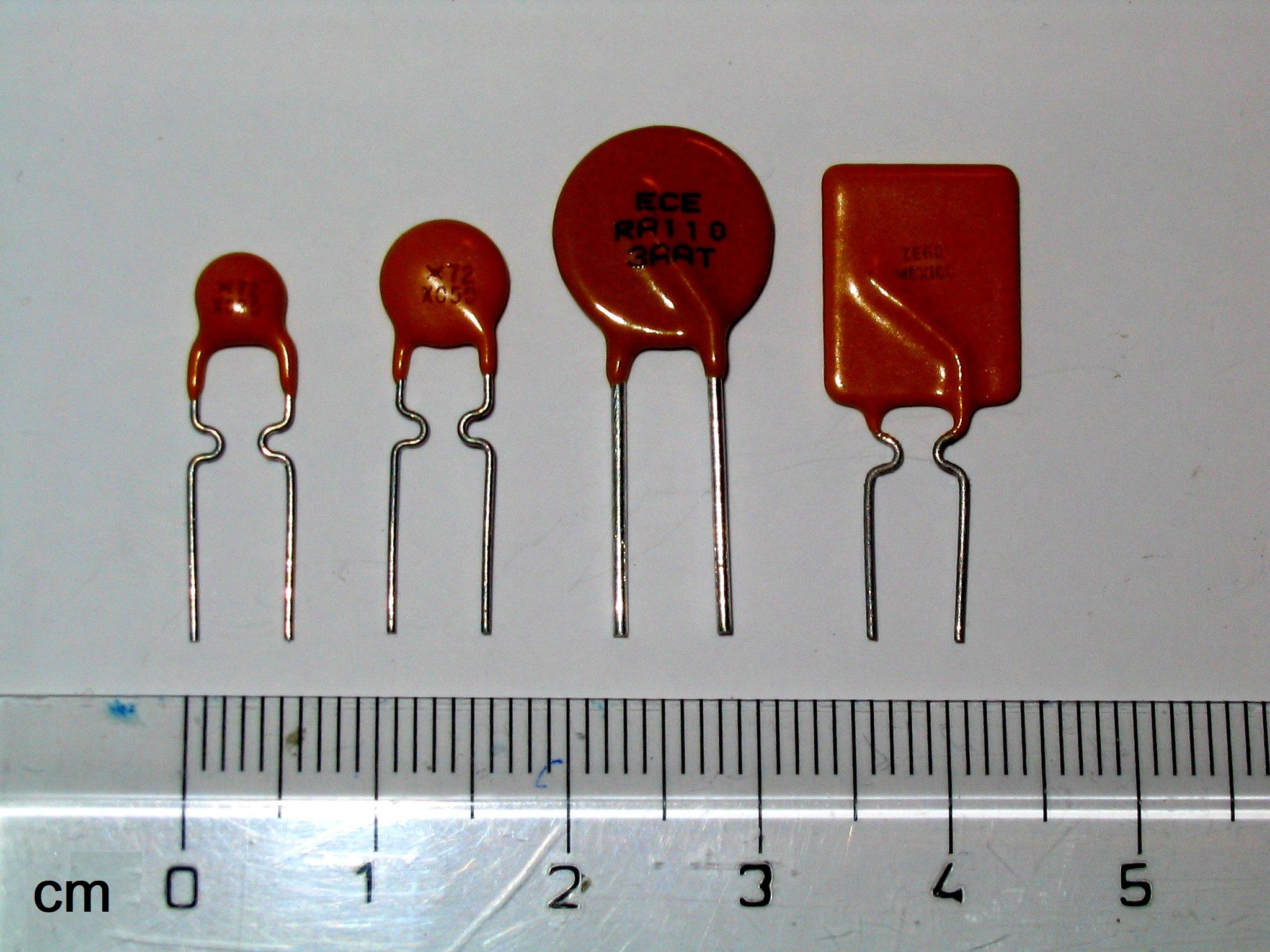
Resettable fuses - PolySwitch devices

A resettable fuse or polymeric positive temperature coefficient device (PPTC) is a passive electronic component used to protect against overcurrent faults in electronic circuits. The device is also known as a multifuse or polyfuse or polyswitch. They are similar in function to PTC thermistors in certain situations but operate on mechanical changes instead of charge carrier effects in semiconductors. These devices were first discovered and described by Gerald Pearson at Bell Labs in 1939 and described in US patent #2,258,958.

== Operation ==
A polymeric PTC device is made up of a non-conductive crystalline organic polymer matrix that is loaded with carbon black particles to make it conductive. While cold, the polymer is in a crystalline state, with the carbon forced into the regions between crystals, forming many conductive chains. Since it is conductive (the "initial resistance"), it will pass a current. If too much current is passed through the device, the device will begin to heat. As the device heats, the polymer will expand, changing from a crystalline into an amorphous state. The expansion separates the carbon particles and breaks the conductive pathways, causing the device to heat faster and expand more, further raising the resistance. This increase in resistance substantially reduces the current in the circuit. A small (leakage) current still flows through the device and is sufficient to maintain the temperature at a level which will keep it in the high resistance state. Leakage current can range from less than a hundred mA at rated voltage up to a few hundred mA at lower voltages. The device can be said to have latching functionality. The hold current is the maximum current at which the device is guaranteed not to trip. The trip current is the current at which the device is guaranteed to trip.

When power is removed, the heating due to the leakage current will stop and the PPTC device will cool. As the device cools, it regains its original crystalline structure and returns to a low resistance state where it can hold the current as specified for the device. This cooling usually takes a few seconds, though a tripped device will retain a slightly higher resistance for hours, unless the power in it is weaker, or has been often used, slowly approaching the initial resistance value. The resetting will often not take place even if the fault alone has been removed with the power still flowing as the operating current may be above the holding current of the PPTC. The device may not return to its original resistance value; it will most likely stabilize at a significantly higher resistance (up to 4 times initial value). It could take hours, days, weeks or even years for the device to return to a resistance value similar to its original value, if at all.

A PPTC device has a current rating and a voltage rating.

== Applications ==
These devices are often used in computer power supplies, largely due to the PC 97 standard (which recommends a sealed PC that the user never has to open), and in aerospace/nuclear applications where replacement is difficult. Another application for such devices is protecting audio loudspeakers, particularly tweeters, from damage when over-driven: by putting a resistor or light bulb in parallel with the PPTC device it is possible to design a circuit that limits total current through the tweeter to a safe value instead of cutting it off, allowing the speaker to continue operating without damage when the amplifier is delivering more power than the tweeter could tolerate. While a fuse could also offer similar protection, if the fuse is blown, the tweeter cannot operate until the fuse is replaced.

== See also ==
- Positive temperature coefficient
- Zener diode
