= Phantom circuit =

Circuit within a circuit

In telecommunications and electrical engineering, a phantom circuit is an electrical circuit derived from suitably arranged wires with one or more conductive paths being a circuit in itself and at the same time acting as one conductor of another circuit.

== Phantom group ==
Phantom circuit derived from two subscriber circuits

A phantom group is composed of three circuits that are derived from two single-channel circuits to form a phantom circuit. Here the phantom circuit is a third circuit derived from two suitably arranged pairs of wires, called side circuits, with each pair of wires being a circuit in itself and at the same time acting as one conductor of the third circuit. The "side circuits" within phantom circuits can be coupled to their respective voltage drops by center-tapped transformers, usually called "repeating coils". The center taps are on the line side of the side circuits. Current from the phantom circuit is split evenly by the center taps. This cancels crosstalk from the phantom circuit to the side circuits.

Diagram showing how the phantom currents (red) cancel in the transformer. Side circuit currents (blue) do not cancel and are transmitted through the transformer.

Phantom working increased the number of circuits on long-distance routes in the early 20th century without putting up more wires. Phantoming declined with the adoption of carrier systems.

It is theoretically possible to create a phantom circuit from two other phantom circuits and so on up in a pyramid with a maximum 2n-1 circuits being derived from n original circuits. However, more than one level of phantoming is usually impractical. Isolation between the phantom circuit and the side circuits relies on accurate balance of the line and transformers. Imperfect balance results in crosstalk between the phantom and side circuits and this effect accumulates as each level of phantoms is added. Even small levels of crosstalk are unacceptable on analogue telecommunications circuits since speech crosstalk is still intelligible down to quite low levels.

== Phantom microphone powering ==
Condenser microphones have impedance converter (current amplifier) circuitry that requires powering; in addition, the capsule of any non-electret, non-RF condenser microphone requires a polarizing voltage to be applied. Since the mid- to late 1960s most balanced, professional condenser microphones for recording and broadcast have used phantom powering. It can be provided by outboard AC or battery supplies, but nowadays is most often built into the mixing console, recorder or microphone preamplifier to which the microphones are connected.

The most common circuit uses +48 V DC fed through a matched pair of 6.8 kΩ resistors for each input channel. This arrangement has been standardized by the IEC and ISO, along with a less-commonly-used arrangement with +12 V DC and 680 Ω feed resistors.

As a practical matter, phantom powering allows the same two-conductor shielded cables to be used for both dynamic microphones and condenser microphones, while being harmless to balanced microphones that aren't designed to consume it, since the circuit balance prevents any substantial DC from flowing through the output circuit of those microphones.

== DC phantom ==
Simple DC signalling can be achieved on a telecommunications line in a similar way to phantom powering of microphones. A switch connected to the transformer centre-tap at one end of the line can operate a similarly connected relay at the other end. The return path is through the ground connection. This arrangement can be used for remotely controlling equipment.

== Carrier circuit phantoms ==
From the 1950s to around the 1980s, using phantoms on star-quad trunk carrier circuits was a popular method of deriving a high quality broadcast audio circuit. The multiplexed FDM telecommunications carrier system usually did not use the baseband of the cable because it was inconvenient to separate low frequencies with filters. On the other hand, a one-way audio phantom could be formed from the two pairs (go and return signals) making up the star-quad cable.

== Unloaded phantom ==
Unloaded phantom configuration. The windings of the loading coil are wound such that the magnetic flux induced in the core is normally in the same direction for both windings. However, in the phantom configuration the flux cancels.

Unloaded phantom is a phantom configuration of loaded lines (a circuit fitted with loading coils). The idea here is not to create additional circuits. Rather, the purpose is to cancel or greatly reduce the effect of the loading coils fitted to a line. The reason for doing this is that loaded lines have a definite cut-off frequency and it may be desired to equalise the line to a frequency which is higher than this, for example to make a circuit suitable for use by a broadcaster. Ideally, the loading would be removed or reduced for a permanent connection, but this is not feasible for temporary arrangements such as a requirement for outside broadcast. Instead, two circuits in a phantom configuration can be used to greatly reduce the inductance being inserted by the loading coils, and hence the loading effect.

Diagram showing how the flux due to the phantom currents (red) is cancelled in the load coil. Flux due to normal line currents (blue) is additive.

It works because the loading coils used on balanced lines have two windings, one for each leg of the circuit. They are both wound on a common core and the windings are so arranged that the magnetic flux induced by both of them is in the same direction. Both windings induce an emf in each other as well as their own self-induction. This effect greatly increases the inductance of the coil and hence its loading effectiveness. By contrast, when the circuit is in the phantom configuration the currents in the two wires of each pair are in the same direction and the magnetic flux is being cancelled. This has precisely the opposite effect and the inductance is greatly reduced.

This configuration is most commonly used on the two pairs of a star-quad cable. It is not so successful with other pairs of wires. The difference in the path of the two pairs can easily destroy the balance and results in crosstalk and interference.

This configuration can also be called "bunched pairs". However, "bunched pairs" can also refer to the straightforward connection of two lines in parallel which is not a phantom circuit and will not reduce the loading.

== See also ==
- Bridge circuit - a closely related concept; the operation of a phantom circuit depends on it being a kind of balanced bridge
- Single-wire earth return - power transmission using one wire and the Earth as a return conductor
