= Star quad cable =

Type of electrical cable configuration

Star-quad cable intended for use with a single two-wire circuit or two two-wire circuits. It is often used with microphone signals in professional audio.

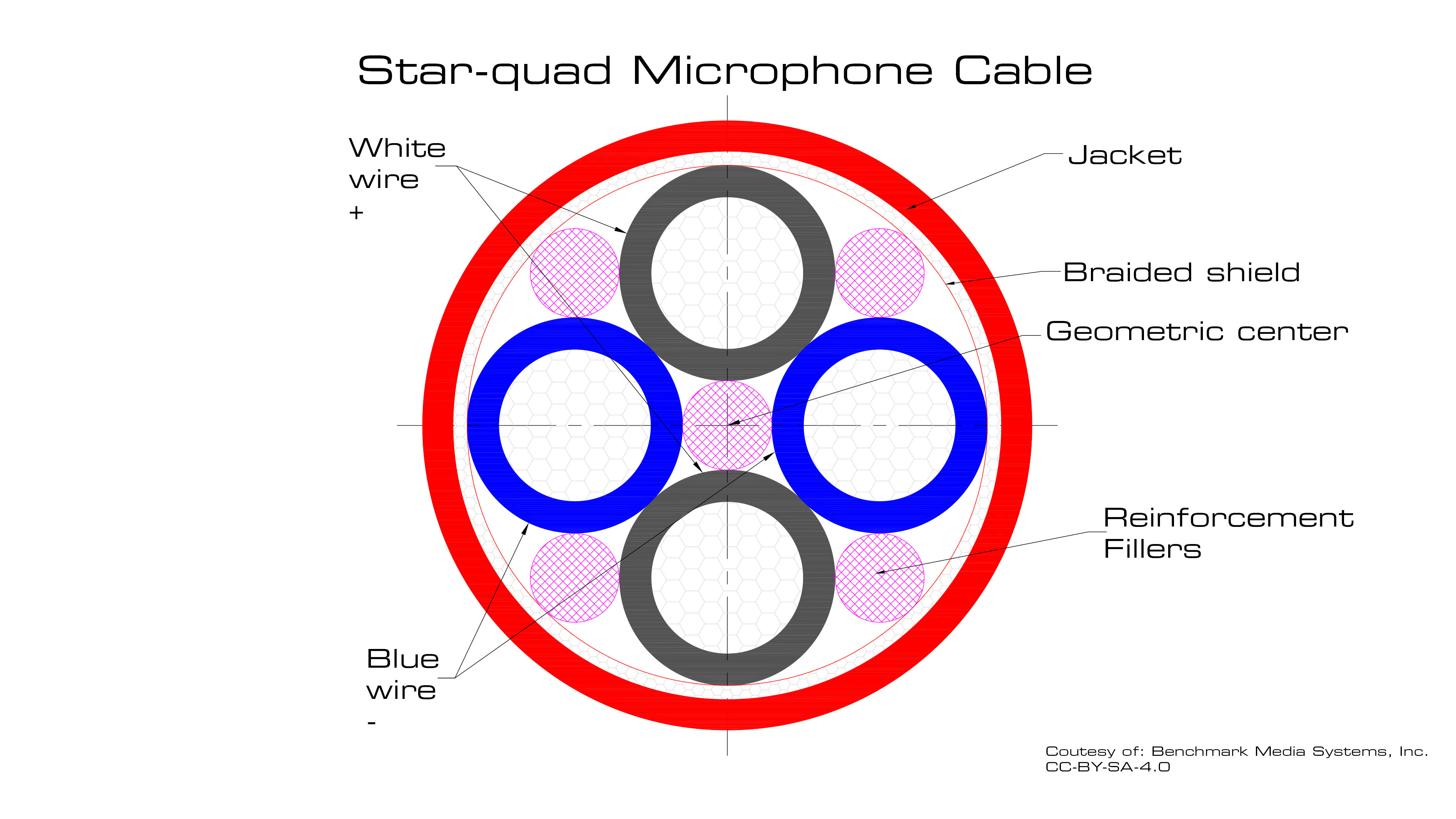
Star-quad cable cross-section

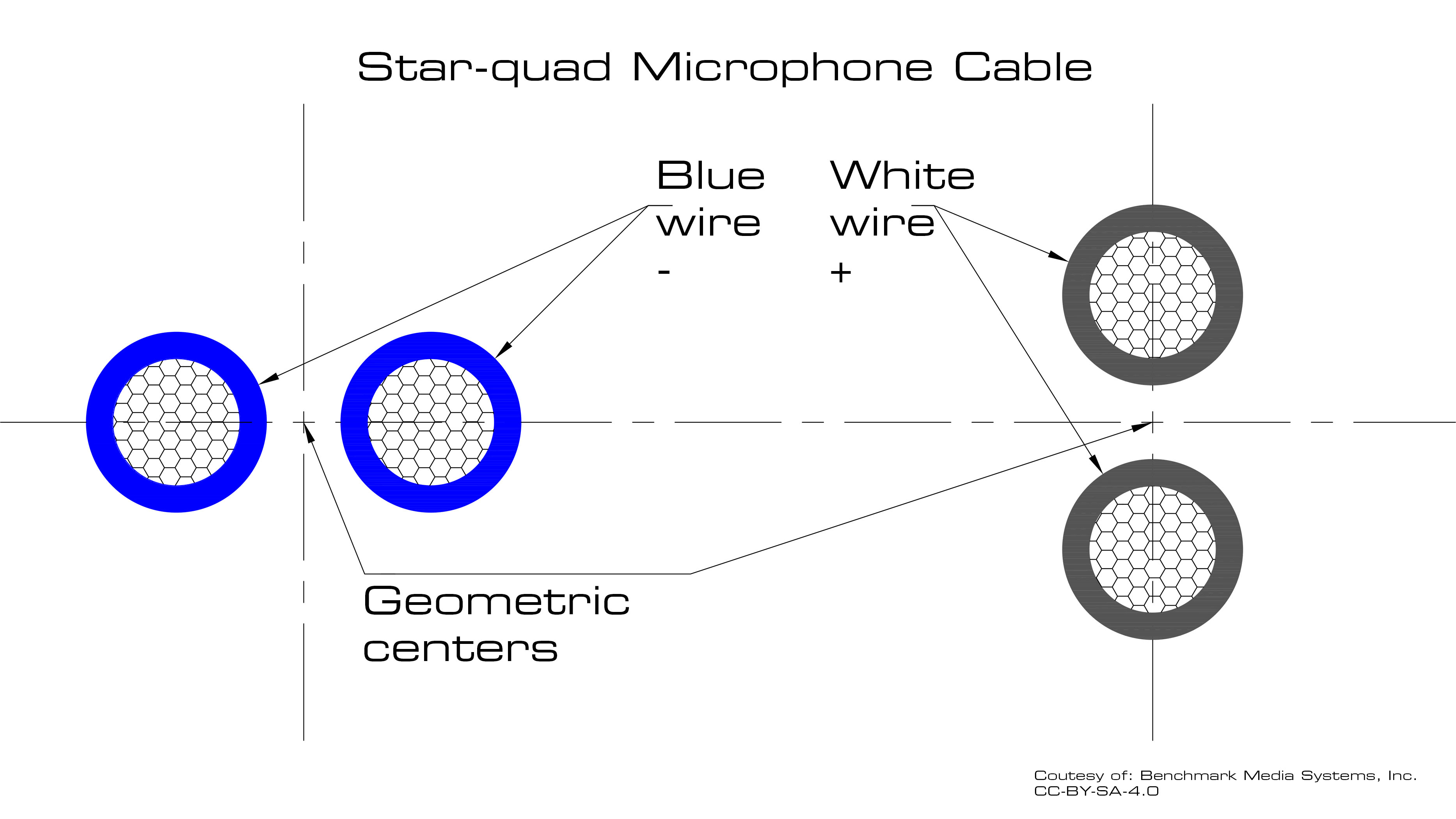
Star-quad exploded view showing the geometric centers of the dual-conductors used for each leg of the balanced line.

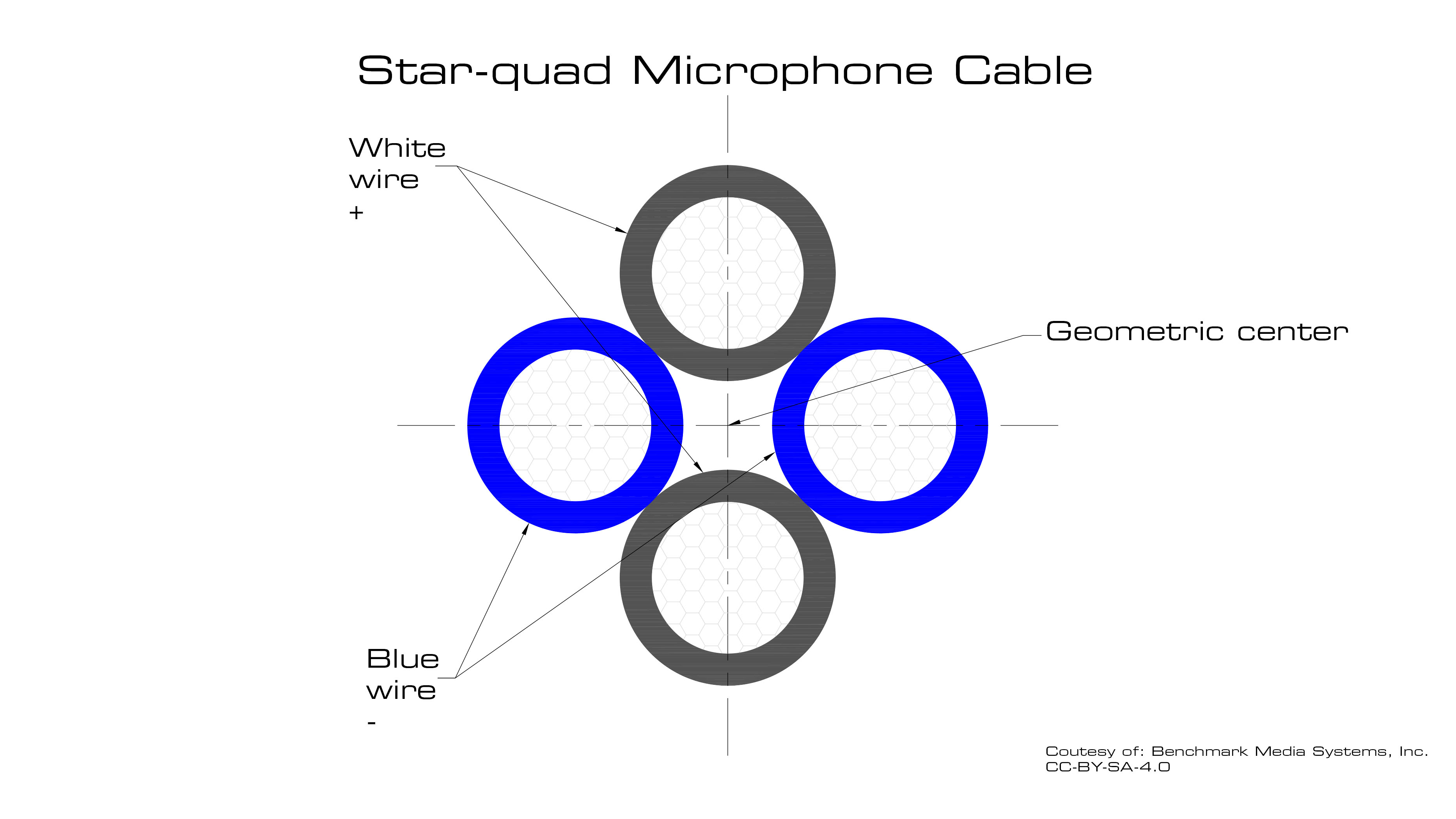
To achieve magnetic immunity, geometric centers of both dual-conductors must be aligned to a common point.

In electrical engineering, star-quad cable is a four-conductor electrical cable that has a special quadrupole geometry which provides magnetic immunity when used in a balanced line. Four conductors are used to carry the two legs of the balanced line. All four conductors must be an equal distance from a common point (usually the center of the cable). The four conductors are arranged in a four-pointed star (forming a square). Opposite points of the star are connected together at each end of the cable to form each leg of the balanced circuit.

Star quad cables often use filler elements to hold the conductor centers in a symmetric four-point arrangement about the cable axis. All points of the star must lie at equal distances from the center of the star. When opposite points are connected together, they act as if they are one conductor located at the center of the star. This configuration places the geometric center of each of the two legs of the balanced circuit in the center of the star. To a magnetic field, both legs of the balanced circuit appear to be in the exact center of the star. This means that both legs of the balanced circuit will receive exactly the same interference from the magnetic field and a common-mode interference signal will be produced. This common-mode interference signal will be rejected by the balanced receiver.

The magnetic immunity of star quad cable is a function of the accuracy of the star-quad geometry, the accuracy of the impedance balancing, and the common-mode rejection ratio of the balanced receiver. Star-quad cable typically provides a 10 dB to 30 dB reduction in magnetically-induced interference.

== Advantages ==
When star-quad cable is used for a single balanced line, such as professional audio applications and two-wire telephony, two non-adjacent conductors are terminated together at both ends of the cable, and the other two conductors are also terminated together. Interference picked up by the cable arrives as a virtually perfect common mode signal, which is easily removed by a coupling transformer or differential amplifier. The combined benefits of twisting, differential signalling, and quadrupole pattern give outstanding noise immunity, especially advantageous for low-signal-level applications such as long microphone cables, even when installed very close to a power cable. It is particularly beneficial compared to twisted pair when AC magnetic field sources are in close proximity, for example a stage cable that can lie against an inline power transformer.

== Disadvantages ==
The disadvantage is that star quad, in combining two conductors, typically has more capacitance than similar two-conductor twisted and shielded audio cable. High capacitance causes an increasing loss of high frequencies as distance increases. The high-frequency loss is due to the RC filter formed by the output impedance of the cable driver and the capacitance of the cable. In some cases an increase in distortion can occur in the cable driver if it has difficulty driving the higher cable capacitance.

The capacitance of a four-conductor quad-star cable is roughly equal to the capacitance of a standard two-conductor cable about 1.5 times as long. The increased capacitance of the star quad cable is not usually a problem with short cable runs, but it can be an issue for long cable runs. For example, an 80 m (260 ft) star-quad cable has a capacitance of 150 pF/m for a total capacitance of 12 nF for the entire length of cable. With a 600 Ohm source impedance the frequency response of this RC circuit is -3 dB at 19 kHz, and -0.02 dB at 5 kHz.

== Other applications for star quad cable ==
While the above discussion focuses on preventing noise from getting in (e.g. into a microphone cable) the same star-quad quadrupole configuration is useful for audio speaker cable, for split-phase electric power wiring, and even for open-wire star quad transmission line.

In these cases, the purpose of the star quad configuration is reversed. The star-quad geometry partially cancels the magnetic fields that are produced by the two pairs of conductors. This cancellation reduces the magnetic emissions of the cable. To work properly, the cable must be wired in the same fashion as the microphone cable example above. Wires on opposite sides of the star must be shorted together at each end of the cable. This means that four conductors are required for a two-wire circuit. Furthermore, this scheme only works if the two pairs of conductors carry equal and opposite currents.

If a ground conductor is also needed, it must be added in a way that will not interfere with the star-quad geometry. It should also be added in a geometric configuration that exposes the ground conductor to equal interference from all four star-quad conductors. The most common solution is to wrap the star quad with a cylindrical ground conductor.

Star-quad cable can be used for two circuits, such as four-wire telephony and other telecommunications applications, but it will not provide magnetic immunity in this application. In this configuration each pair uses two non-adjacent conductors. Because the conductors are always the same distance from each other, crosstalk is reduced relative to cables with two separate twisted pairs. Each conductor of one pair sees an equal capacitance to both wires in the other pair. This cancels the capacitive crosstalk between the two pairs. The geometry also cancels the magnetic interference between the two pairs.
