= Four-wire terminating set =

A four-wire terminating set (4WTS) is a balanced transformer used to perform a conversion between four-wire and two-wire operation in telecommunication systems.

For example, a 4-wire circuit may, by means of a 4-wire terminating set, be connected to a 2-wire telephone set. Also, a pair of 4-wire terminating sets may be used to introduce an intermediate 4-wire circuit into a 2-wire circuit, in which loop repeaters may be situated to amplify signals in each direction without positive feedback and oscillation.

The 4WTS differs from a simple hybrid coil in being equipped to adjust its impedance to maximize return loss.

Four-wire terminating sets were largely supplanted by resistance hybrids in the late 20th century.
