= Common mode =

Common mode is a term in engineering with at least two independent meanings.

- Of electrical signals,
  - Common-mode signal, a component of an analog signal with the same sign on two signal leads
  - Common-mode rejection ratio, the ratio of rejection of common mode signals to differential signals
- Common mode failure is when one event causes multiple systems to fail
