= Duplex (telecommunications) =

Communication flowing simultaneously in both directions

A duplex communication system is a point-to-point system composed of two or more connected parties or devices that can communicate with one another in both directions. Duplex systems are employed in many communications networks, either to allow for simultaneous communication in both directions between two connected parties or to provide a reverse path for the monitoring and remote adjustment of equipment in the field. There are two types of duplex communication systems: full-duplex (FDX) and half-duplex (HDX).

In a full-duplex system, both parties can communicate with each other simultaneously. An example of a full-duplex device is plain old telephone service; the parties at both ends of a call can speak and be heard by the other party simultaneously. The earphone reproduces the speech of the remote party as the microphone transmits the speech of the local party. There is a two-way communication channel between them, or more strictly speaking, there are two communication channels between them.

In a half-duplex or semiduplex system, both parties can communicate with each other, but not simultaneously; the communication is one direction at a time. An example of a half-duplex device is a walkie-talkie, a two-way radio that has a push-to-talk button. When the local user wants to speak to the remote person, they push this button, which turns on the transmitter and turns off the receiver, preventing them from hearing the remote person while talking. To listen to the remote person, they release the button, which turns on the receiver and turns off the transmitter. This terminology is not completely standardized, and some sources define this mode as simplex.

Systems that do not need duplex capability may instead use simplex communication, in which one device transmits and the others can only listen. Examples are broadcast radio and television, garage door openers, baby monitors, wireless microphones, and surveillance cameras. In these devices, the communication is only in one direction.

== Simplex ==
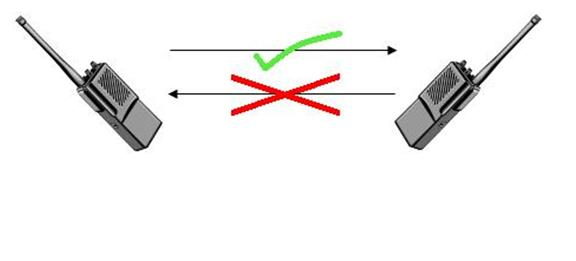
Simplex wireless communication

Simplex communication is a communication channel that sends information in one direction only.

The International Telecommunication Union definition is a communications channel that operates in one direction at a time, but that may be reversible; this is termed half duplex in other contexts.

For example, in TV and radio broadcasting, information flows only from the transmitter site to multiple receivers. A pair of walkie-talkie two-way radios provides a simplex circuit in the ITU sense; only one party at a time can talk, while the other listens until it can hear an opportunity to transmit. The transmission medium (the radio signal over the air) can carry information in only one direction.

The Western Union company used the term simplex when describing the half-duplex and simplex capacity of their new transatlantic telegraph cable completed between Newfoundland and the Azores in 1928. The same definition for a simplex radio channel was used by the National Fire Protection Association in 2002.

== Half duplex ==
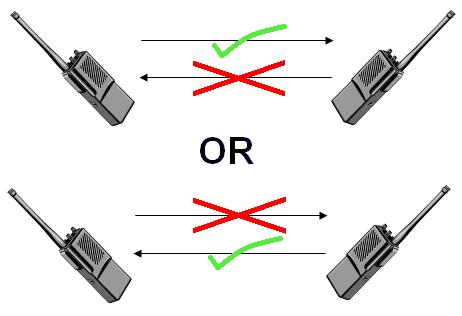
A simple illustration of a half-duplex communication system

A half-duplex (HDX) system provides communication in both directions, but only one direction at a time, not simultaneously in both directions. This terminology is not completely standardized between defining organizations, and in radio communication, some sources classify this mode as simplex. Typically, once one party begins a transmission, the other party on the channel must wait for the transmission to complete before replying.

An example of a half-duplex system is a two-party system such as a walkie-talkie, wherein one must say "over" or another previously designated keyword to indicate the end of transmission, to ensure that only one party transmits at a time. A good analogy for a half-duplex system would be a one-lane road that allows two-way traffic; traffic can only flow in one direction at a time.

Half-duplex systems are usually used to conserve bandwidth, at the cost of reducing the overall bidirectional throughput, since only a single communication channel is needed and is shared alternately between the two directions. For example, a walkie-talkie or a DECT phone or so-called TDD 4G or 5G phones requires only a single frequency for bidirectional communication, while a cell phone in the so-called FDD mode is a full-duplex device, and generally requires two frequencies to carry the two simultaneous voice channels, one in each direction.

In automatic communications systems such as two-way data links, time-division multiplexing can be used for time allocations for communications in a half-duplex system. For example, station A on one end of the data link could be allowed to transmit for exactly one second, then station B on the other end could be allowed to transmit for exactly one second, and then the cycle repeats. In this scheme, the channel is never left idle.

In half-duplex systems, if more than one party transmits at the same time, a collision occurs, resulting in lost or distorted messages.

== Full duplex ==
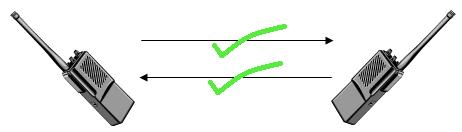
A simple illustration of a full-duplex communication system. Full-duplex is not common in handheld radios as shown here due to the cost and complexity of common duplexing methods, but is used in telephones, cellphones and cordless phones.

A full-duplex (FDX) system allows communication in both directions and, unlike half-duplex, allows this to happen simultaneously. Land-line telephone networks are full-duplex since they allow both callers to speak and be heard at the same time. Full-duplex operation is achieved on a two-wire circuit through the use of a hybrid coil in a telephone hybrid. Modern cell phones are also full-duplex.

There is a technical distinction between full-duplex communication, which uses a single physical communication channel for both directions simultaneously, and dual-simplex communication which uses two distinct channels, one for each direction. From the user perspective, the technical difference does not matter and both variants are commonly referred to as full duplex.

Many Ethernet connections achieve full-duplex operation by making simultaneous use of two physical twisted pairs inside the same jacket, or two optical fibers which are directly connected to each networked device: one pair or fiber is for receiving packets, while the other is for sending packets. Other Ethernet variants, such as 1000BASE-T use the same channels in each direction simultaneously. In any case, with full-duplex operation, the cable itself becomes a collision-free environment and doubles the maximum total transmission capacity supported by each Ethernet connection.

Full-duplex also has several benefits over the use of half-duplex. Since there is only one transmitter on each twisted pair, there is no contention and no collisions, so time is not wasted by having to wait or retransmit frames. Full transmission capacity is available in both directions because the send and receive functions are separate.

Some computer-based systems of the 1960s and 1970s required full-duplex facilities, even for half-duplex operation, since their poll-and-response schemes could not tolerate the slight delays in reversing the direction of transmission in a half-duplex line.

=== Echo cancellation ===
Full-duplex audio systems like telephones can create echo, which is distracting to users and impedes the performance of modems. Echo occurs when the sound originating from the far end comes out of the speaker at the near end and re-enters the microphone (Note: This feedback path may be acoustic, through the air, or it may be mechanically coupled, for example, in a telephone handset.) there and is then sent back to the far end. The sound then reappears at the original source end, but delayed.

Echo cancellation is a signal-processing operation that subtracts the far-end signal from the microphone signal before it is sent back over the network. Echo cancellation is an important technology allowing modems to achieve good full-duplex performance. The V.32, V.34, V.56, and V.90 modem standards require echo cancellation. Echo cancelers are available as both software and hardware implementations. They can be independent components in a communications system or integrated into the communication system's central processing unit.

== Full-duplex emulation ==
Where channel access methods are used in point-to-multipoint networks (such as cellular networks) for dividing forward and reverse communication channels on the same physical communications medium, they are known as duplexing methods.

=== Time-division duplexing ===
Time-division duplexing (TDD) is the application of time-division multiplexing to separate outward and return signals. It emulates full-duplex communication over a half-duplex communication link.

Time-division duplexing is flexible in the case where there is asymmetry of the uplink and downlink data rates or utilization. As the amount of uplink data increases, more communication capacity can be dynamically allocated, and as the traffic load becomes lighter, capacity can be taken away. The same applies in the downlink direction.

The transmit/receive transition gap (TTG) is the gap (time) between a downlink burst and the subsequent uplink burst. Similarly, the receive/transmit transition gap (RTG) is the gap between an uplink burst and the subsequent downlink burst.

Examples of time-division duplexing systems include:

- UMTS-TDD for data communications on 3G mobile networks
- LTE-TDD for data communications on 4G mobile networks
- DECT wireless telephony
- Half-duplex packet-switched networks based on carrier-sense multiple access, for example, 2-wire or hubbed Ethernet, Wireless local area networks and Bluetooth, can be considered as time-division duplexing systems, albeit not TDMA with fixed frame lengths.
- WiMAX
- PACTOR
- ISDN BRI U interface, variants using the time-compression multiplex (TCM) line system
- G.fast, a digital subscriber line (DSL) standard developed by the ITU-T

=== Frequency-division duplexing ===
Frequency-division duplexing (FDD) means that the transmitter and receiver operate using different carrier frequencies.

The method is frequently used in ham radio operation, where an operator is attempting to use a repeater station. The repeater station must be able to send and receive a transmission at the same time and does so by slightly altering the frequency at which it sends and receives. This mode of operation is referred to as duplex mode or offset mode. Uplink and downlink sub-bands are said to be separated by the frequency offset.

Frequency-division duplex systems can extend their range by using sets of simple repeater stations because the communications transmitted on any single frequency always travel in the same direction.

Frequency-division duplexing can be efficient in the case of symmetric traffic. In this case, time-division duplexing tends to waste bandwidth during the switch-over from transmitting to receiving, has greater inherent latency, and may require more complex circuitry.

Another advantage of frequency-division duplexing is that it makes radio planning easier and more efficient since base stations do not hear each other (as they transmit and receive in different sub-bands) and therefore will normally not interfere with each other. Conversely, with time-division duplexing systems, care must be taken to keep guard times between neighboring base stations (which decreases spectral efficiency) or to synchronize base stations, so that they will transmit and receive at the same time (which increases network complexity and therefore cost, and reduces bandwidth allocation flexibility as all base stations and sectors will be forced to use the same uplink/downlink ratio).

Examples of frequency-division duplexing systems include:

- ADSL and VDSL
- Mobile technology, including LTE, UMTS and CDMA2000
- IEEE 802.16 WiMax

== See also ==
- Communication channel
- Crossband operation
- Double-track railway
- Duplex mismatch
- Duplexer
- Four-wire circuit
- Multiplexing
- Push-to-talk
- Radio resource management
