= Differential TTL =

Differential TTL is a type of binary electrical signaling based on the transistor-transistor logic (TTL) concept. It enables electronic systems to be relatively immune to noise. RS-422 and RS-485 outputs can be implemented as differential TTL.

Normal TTL signals are single-ended, which means that each signal consists of a voltage on one wire, referenced to a system ground. The "low" voltage level is zero to 0.8 volts, and the "high" voltage level is 2 volts to 5 volts. A differential TTL signal consists of two such wires, also referenced to a system ground. The logic level on one wire is always the complement of the other. The principle is similar to that of low-voltage differential signaling (LVDS), but with different voltage levels.

Differential TTL is used in preference to single-ended TTL for long-distance signaling. In a long cable, stray electromagnetic fields in the environment, or stray currents in the system ground, can induce unwanted voltages that cause errors at the receiver. With a differential pair of wires, roughly the same unwanted voltage is induced in each wire. The receiver subtracts the voltages on the two wires, so that the unwanted voltage disappears, and only the voltage created by the driver remains.

A second advantage of differential TTL is that the differential pair of wires can form a current loop. The driver sources a current from the power supply into one wire. This current passes along the wire to the receiver, through the termination resistor and back up the other wire, then back through the driver and down to ground. No net current is exchanged between the driver and receiver, which means that none of the signal current has to return through the ground connection (if there is one) between the two ends. This arrangement prevents the signal from injecting currents into the ground connection, which might upset other circuits attached to it.

Differential TTL is the most common type of high-voltage differential signaling (HVDS).

== Applications ==
Differential TTL signaling was used in the Serial Storage Architecture (SSA) standard devised by IBM, but this is mostly obsolete. More efficient signaling techniques such as LVDS are now used instead.

== See also ==
- Differential signalling
