= Screen heating =

Heating of screen separators to reduce blockage

The method of screening has been linked to the early Egyptians who used the process to separate basic minerals by using a mesh that had equal openings. This idea fell down through the ages and developed into a series of European patents around 1924, when the thought of electrically heating the wire cloth for screens was considered. This was the first attempt at eliminating screen blinding (when the material being processed (clay, dirt, etc.) clogs the holes in the screen) by using heat, and it proved that the surface tension from blinding was reduced when heat was introduced.

The first commercially available screen heating system was developed in 1947 by F.R. Hannon & Sons (now Hanco International (), and Thomas W. Hannon obtained a patent for his electrically heated screen construction and method. This was just in time, as industries were beginning to expand in coming out of World War II. The first applications of the screen heating system were limited almost exclusively to the clay industry, though it did not take long for other applications, in a variety of industries, to be identified.

Another significant invention for screen heating was created by Thomas W. Hannon (for Hanco International). This was for screen-related clamp bars (also known as a Wedge Grip), that are used when mounting a screen on frame members. The clamp bars secured a screen to a tensioning rail, which in turn increased the electrical connection between the two components. ()

In the years following, copper and copper cables were implemented in an attempt to improve the system. Silicon-bonded fiberglass was also added to the insulation of screen boxes. For a short period, flexible shunts were also used, but a major deficiency was found in attaching the stationary transformer to a screen that vibrated.

== The Invention of the Flux-Power Screen Heating System ==
In exploring ways to properly attach a transformer to a vibrating screen, Hanco International () pioneered the Flux-Power Screen Heating System. The invention came to be in 1961, created by Thomas W. Hannon, and it was unlike anything of its time. The design eliminated the use of physical connections as seen in earlier screen heating systems. Omitting the mechanical connection also deletes the possibility of primary winding failures that come with short circuits on the secondary of the transformer while eliminating wear and fatigue on the screen, itself. This design also allowed for the transformer to be encapsulated and protected from the elements and dust.

When processing basic mineral deposits (clay, shale, limestone, etc.), Flux-Powered Screen Heating Systems are ideal. Heating the screen lessens surface tension from moisture which is a main reason for stickiness against cloth mediums. Introducing heat allows maximum contact and keeps the screen clear, allowing finer material separations and more precise sizing. This, in turn, adds to efficiency.

Flux-Powered Screen Heating Systems have been used and proven effective in screening fertilizers (in handling phosphoric, potash and sulfate rock), foods, chemicals, and in recovering coal for power.

== Gallery ==
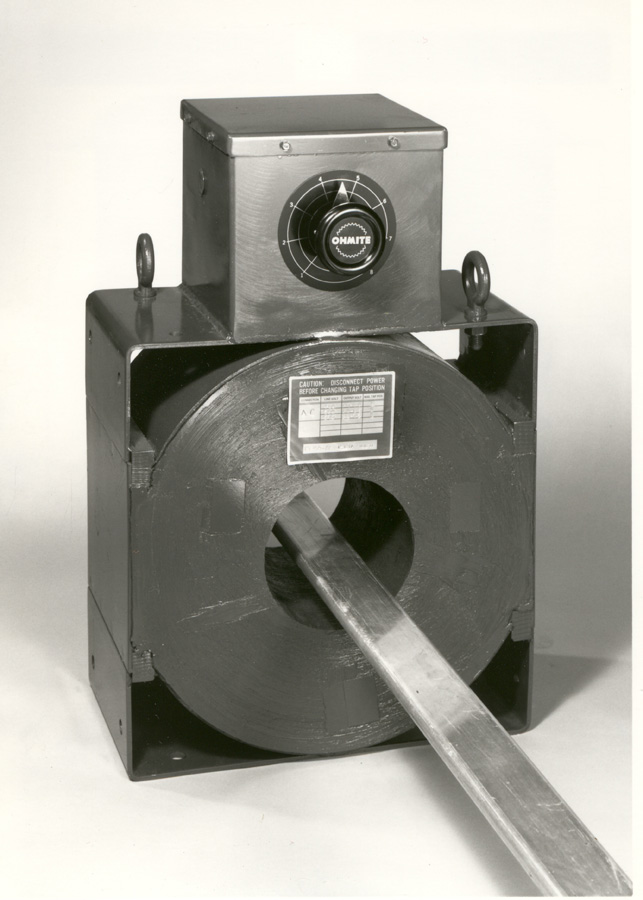
First Flux-Power Transformer

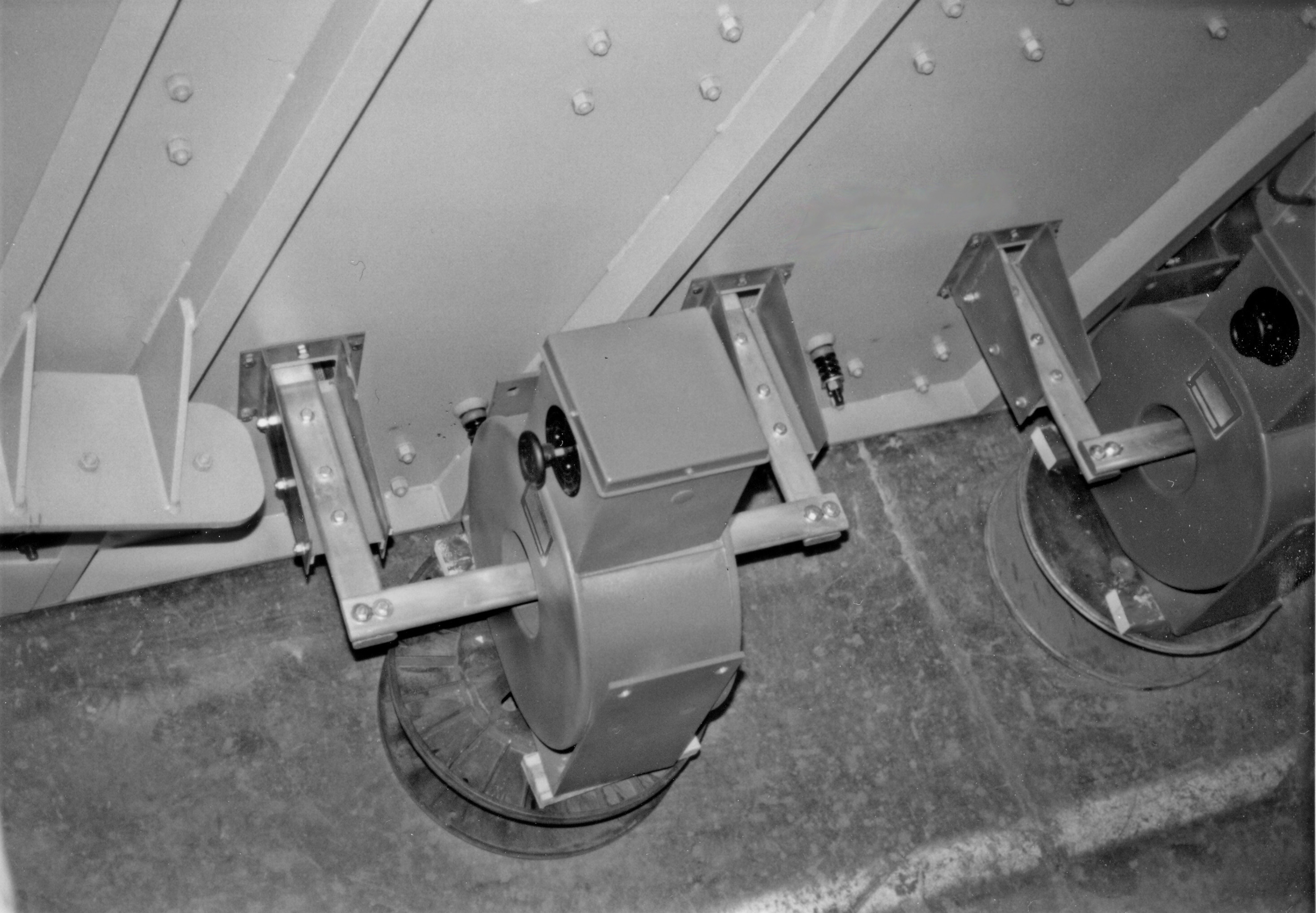
Flux-Power Today

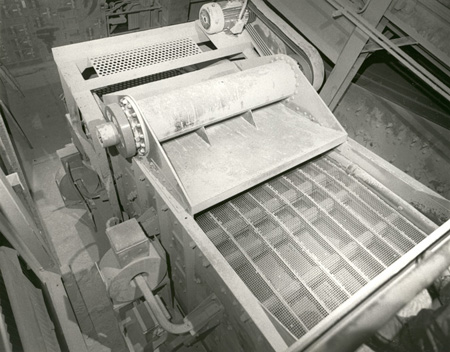
An Original Screen

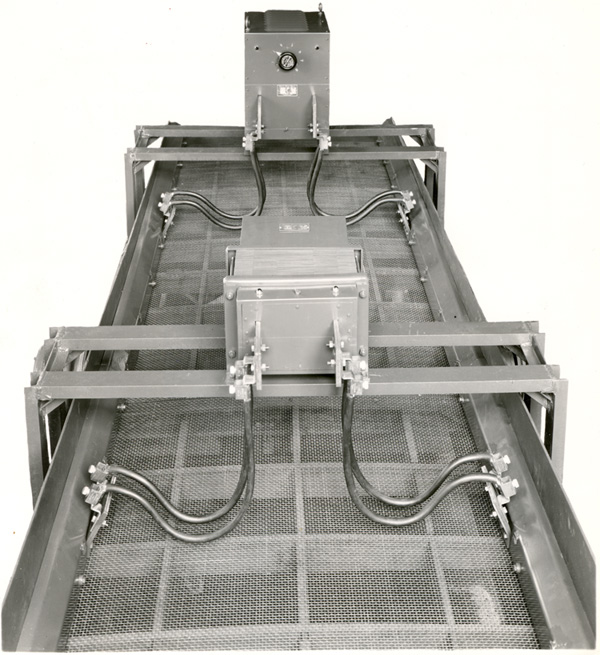
An Original Screen Heating System

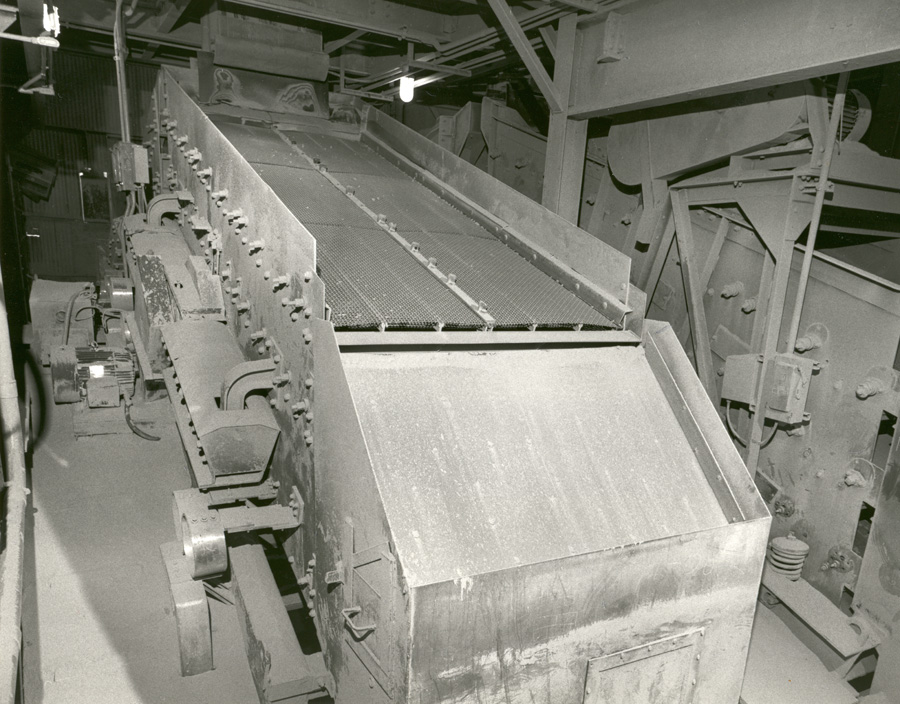
Shunt Screen

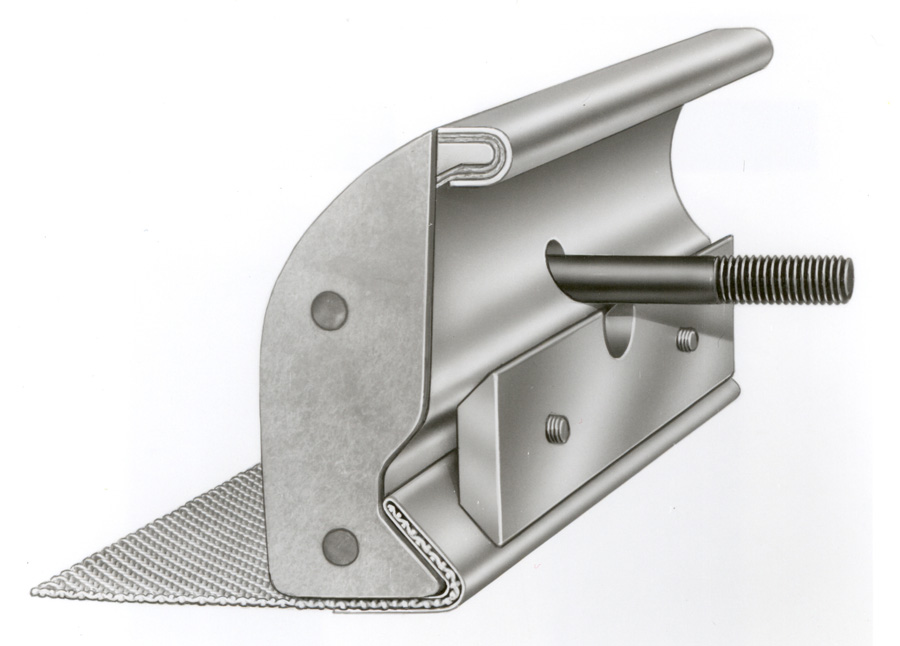
Wedge Grip (Clamp Bar)
