= Polarity inversion =

Polarity inversion may refer to:

- Polarity inversion (chemistry) (aka Umpolung), in organic chemistry
- Polarity inversion (differential pairs), swapping of positive and negative wires in differential signal links

== See also ==
- Polarity reversion
- Auto polarity (disambiguation)
