= Pathlight =

Pathlight may refer to:

- Pathlight Technology, an American manufacturer of storage area network products
- Pathlight School, a Singaporean school for high-functioning autistic children
- Pathlight (magazine), a magazine featuring Chinese literature in English translation
