= Single-ended signaling =

Signal transmission mechanism in wires

Single-ended signaling is the simplest and most commonly used method of transmitting electrical signals over wires. One wire carries a varying voltage that represents the signal, while the other wire is connected to a reference voltage, usually ground. The main alternative to single-ended signaling is called differential signaling where the two conductors carry signals equal in magnitude but of opposite electric polarity.

Single-ended signaling is less expensive to implement than differential, but it has a distinct disadvantage: a single-ended system requires a power supply voltage equal to the maximum amplitude of the signal to be received whereas a differential system only requires a voltage half of the signal amplitude to be received. For a given power supply voltage then, a differential system produces signals of twice the amplitude and therefore has twice as good noise immunity (6 dB higher signal-to-noise ratio) as a single-ended system.

The main advantage of single-ended over differential signaling is that fewer wires are needed to transmit multiple signals. If there are n signals, then there are n+1 wires, one for each signal and one for ground, while differential signaling uses at least 2n wires. A disadvantage of single-ended systems that utilize a common return is that the return currents for all the signals use the same conductor (even if separate ground wires are used, the grounds are inevitably connected together at each end), and this can sometimes cause interference (crosstalk) between the signals.

== Standards ==
Single-ended signaling is widely used, and can be seen in numerous common transmission standards, including:

- RS-232 serial communications
- PS/2 mouse and keyboard connectors
- I²C serial bus
- TTL circuits
- CMOS logic circuits
- ECL circuits
- Most parallel computer buses, such as:
  - VMEbus
  - PCI
- VGA video connectors
- SCSI interfaces for hard drives and other peripherals
- Parallel ATA interfaces for hard drives and other peripherals

== Connectors ==
A wide range of connectors can be used for single-ended signaling. Some common connectors for domestic and entertainment equipment include; Some kinds of connectors, though more often used for balanced pairs, are sometimes used for single-ended operation:

- RCA jacks (phono connectors)
- jack plugs

== Example ==
The widely used RS-232 system is an example of single-ended signaling, which uses ±12 V to represent a signal, and anything less than ±3 V to represent the lack of a signal. The high voltage levels give the signals some immunity from noise, since few naturally occurring signals can create a voltage of such magnitude. They also have the advantage of requiring only one wire per signal. However, they also have a serious disadvantage: they cannot run at high speeds. The effects of capacitance and inductance, which filter out high-frequency signals, limit the speed.

Historically, electrical telegraph used single-ended signaling with earth return, thus completely eliminating the need to provide a return conductor and substantially reducing the cost of long distance lines. Telegraph is the earliest use of the single-ended transmission line type, but is now obsolete.

== See also ==
- Differential signalling
- Unbalanced line
- Unbalanced circuit
- Balanced line
- Balanced circuit
- Single-wire transmission line
