= Hybrid transformer =

Type of electrical transformer

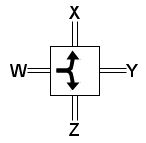
W and Y, X and Z are conjugate pairs

A hybrid transformer (also known as a bridge transformer, hybrid coil, or just hybrid) is a type of directional coupler which is designed to be configured as a circuit having four ports that are conjugate in pairs, implemented using one or more transformers. It is a particular case of the more general concept of a hybrid coupler.

A signal arriving at one port is divided equally between the two adjacent ports but does not appear at the opposite port. In the schematic diagram, the signal into W splits between X and Z, and no signal passes to Y. Similarly, signals into X split to W and Y with none to Z, etc.

Correct operation requires matched characteristic impedance at all four ports. Forms of hybrid other than transformer coils are possible; any format of directional coupler can be designed to be a hybrid. These formats include transmission lines and waveguides.

== Motivation ==
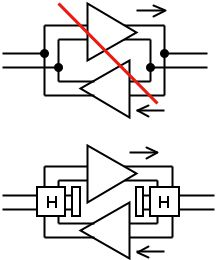
Using hybrids for bidirectional amplification

The primary use of a voiceband hybrid transformer is to convert between 2-wire and 4-wire operation in sequential sections of a communications circuit, for example in a four-wire terminating set. Such conversion was necessary when repeaters were introduced in a 2-wire circuit, a frequent practice at early 20th century telephony. Without hybrids, the output of one amplifier feeds directly into the input of the other, resulting in uncontrollable feedback oscillation (upper diagram). By using hybrids, the outputs and inputs are isolated, resulting in correct 2-wire repeater operation. Late in the century, this practice became rare but hybrids continued in use in line cards.

== Implementations ==
Hybrids are realized using transformers. Two versions of transformer hybrids were used, the single transformer version providing unbalanced outputs with one end grounded, and the double transformer version providing balanced ports.

=== Single transformer ===
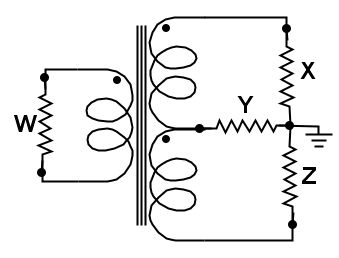
Wiring diagram of a single transformer hybrid

For use in 2-wire repeaters, the single transformer version suffices, since amplifiers in the repeaters have grounded inputs and outputs. X, Y, and Z share a common ground. As shown at left, signal into W, the 2-wire port, will appear at X and Z. But since Y is bridged from center of coil to center of X and Z, no signal appears. Signal into X will appear at W and Y. But signal at Z is the difference of what appears at Y and, through the transformer coil, at W, which is zero. Similar reasoning proves both pairs, W & Y, X & Z, are conjugates.

=== Double transformer ===
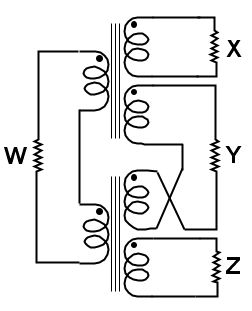
Wiring diagram of a double transformer hybrid

When both the 2-wire and the 4-wire circuits must be balanced, double transformer hybrids are used, as shown at right. Signal into port W splits between X and Z, but due to reversed connection to the windings, cancel at port Y. Signal into port X goes to W and Y. But due to reversed connection to ports W and Y, Z gets no signal. Thus the pairs, W & Y, X & Z, are conjugates.

== Applications ==
Telephone hybrids are used in telephone exchanges to convert the 4-wire appearance to the 2-wire last mile connection to the subscriber's telephone. A different kind of hybrid is used in telephone handsets to convert the four wires of the transmitter (earpiece) and receiver (microphone) to the 2-wire line connection. This kind of hybrid is more commonly called an "induction coil" due to its derivation from high-voltage induction coils. It does not produce a high voltage, but like the high-voltage variety, it is a step-up transformer in order to impedance match the low-impedance carbon button transmitter to the higher impedance parts of the system. The simple induction coil later evolved into a form of hybrid as a sidetone reduction measure, or volume of microphone output that was fed back to the earpiece. Without this, the phone user's own voice would be louder in the earpiece than the other party's. Today, the transformer version of the hybrid has been replaced by resistor networks and compact IC versions, which use integrated circuit electronics to do the job of the hybrid coil.

== See also ==
- Magic tee
- Rat-race coupler
