= Auto polarity =

Auto polarity or auto-polarity may refer to:

- Auto polarity (digital multimeter), automatic polarity switching for signals in measurement devices
- Auto polarity (differential signals), automatic polarity switching of differential signals
- Auto polarity (Ethernet), automatic polarity of differential pairs in networking

== See also ==
- Auto crossover
- Bridge rectifier
- Polarity inversion (disambiguation)
- Polarity switch
