= Balanced line =

Electrical circuit with two conductors of equal impedance

A signal transmitted over a balanced line. The signal is kept intact while the noise (which appears as a common-mode signal at the receiving end) is rejected perfectly.

In telecommunications and professional audio, a balanced line or balanced signal pair is an electrical circuit consisting of two conductors of the same type, both of which have equal impedances along their lengths, to ground, and to other circuits. The primary advantage of the balanced line format is good rejection of common-mode noise and interference when fed to a differential device such as a transformer or differential amplifier. The combination of a balanced line and differential signaling in audio applications is balanced audio and is commonly used in sound reinforcement and sound recording and reproduction.

Another common form of balanced line is twin-lead, used for radio frequency communications. Also common is twisted pair, used for traditional telephone, professional audio, or for data communications. They are to be contrasted to unbalanced lines, such as coaxial cable, which is designed to have its return conductor connected to ground, or circuits whose return conductor actually is earth (see earth-return telegraph). Balanced and unbalanced circuits can be interfaced using a device called a balun.

Circuits driving balanced lines must themselves be balanced to maintain the benefits of balance. This may be achieved by transformer coupling (repeating coils) or by merely balancing the impedance in each conductor.

Lines carrying symmetric signals (those with equal amplitudes but opposite polarities on each leg) are often incorrectly referred to as "balanced", but this is actually differential signalling. Balanced lines and differential signalling are often used together, but they are not the same thing. Differential signalling does not make a line balanced, nor does noise rejection in balanced cables require differential signalling.

== Explanation ==
Fig. 1. Balanced line in twisted pair format. This line is intended for use with 2-wire circuits.

Fig. 2. Balanced line in star quad format. This line is intended for use with 4-wire circuits or two 2-wire circuits. It is also used with microphone signals in professional audio.

Fig. 3. Balanced line in DM quad format. This line is intended for use with 4-wire circuits or two 2-wire circuits.

Fig. 4. Balanced line in twin lead format. This line is intended for use with RF circuits, particularly aerials.

Transmission of a signal over a balanced line reduces the influence of noise or interference due to external stray electric fields. Any external signal sources tend to induce only a common-mode signal on the line, and the balanced impedances to ground minimizes differential pickup due to stray electric fields. The conductors are sometimes twisted together to ensure that each conductor is equally exposed to any external magnetic fields that could induce unwanted noise.

Some balanced lines also have electrostatic shielding to reduce the amount of noise introduced. The cable is often wrapped in foil, copper wire, or a copper braid. This shield provides immunity to RF interference but does not provide immunity to magnetic fields.

Some balanced lines use 4-conductor star quad cable to provide immunity to magnetic fields. The geometry of the cable ensures that magnetic fields will cause equal interference of both legs of the balanced circuit. This balanced interference is a common-mode signal that can easily be removed by a transformer or balanced differential receiver.

A balanced line allows a differential receiver to reduce the noise on a connection by rejecting common-mode interference. The lines have the same impedance to ground, so the interfering fields or currents induce the same voltage in both wires. Since the receiver responds only to the difference between the wires, it is not influenced by the induced noise voltage. If a balanced line is used in an unbalanced circuit, with different impedances from each conductor to ground, currents induced in the separate conductors will cause different voltage drops to ground, thus creating a voltage differential, making the line more susceptible to noise. Examples of twisted pairs include category 5 cable.

Compared to unbalanced lines, balanced lines reduce the amount of noise per distance, allowing a longer cable run to be practical. This is because electromagnetic interference will affect both signals the same way. Similarities between the two signals are automatically removed at the end of the transmission path when one signal is subtracted from the other.

== Telephone systems ==
The first application for balanced lines was for telephone lines. Interference that was of little consequence on a telegraph system (which is in essence digital) could be very disturbing for a telephone user. The initial format was to take two single-wire unbalanced telegraph lines and use them as a pair. This proved insufficient, however, with the growth of electric power transmission, which tended to use the same routes. A telephone line running alongside a power line for many miles will inevitably have more interference induced in one leg than the other since one of them will be nearer to the power line. This issue was addressed by swapping the positions of the two legs every few hundred yards with a cross-over, thus ensuring that both legs had equal interference induced and allowing common-mode rejection to do its work. As the telephone system grew, it became preferable to use cable rather than open wires to save space, and also to avoid poor performance during bad weather. The cable construction used for balanced telephone cables was twisted pair; however, this did not become widespread until repeater amplifiers became available. For an unamplified telephone line, a twisted pair cable could only manage a maximum distance of 30 km. Open wires, on the other hand, with their lower capacitance, had been used for enormous distances—the longest was the 1500 km from New York to Chicago built in 1893. Loading coils were used to improve the distance achievable with cable but the problem was not finally overcome until amplifiers started to be installed in 1912. Twisted pair balanced lines are still widely used for local loops, the lines that connect each subscriber's premises to their respective exchange.

Telephone trunk lines, and especially frequency division multiplexing carrier systems, are usually 4-wire circuits rather than 2-wire circuits (or at least they were before fibre-optic became widespread) and require a different kind of cable. This format requires the conductors to be arranged in two pairs, one pair for the sending (go) signal and the other for the return signal. The greatest source of interference on this kind of transmission is usually the crosstalk between the go and return circuits themselves. The most common cable format is star quad, where the diagonally opposite conductors form the pairs. This geometry gives maximum common-mode rejection between the two pairs. An alternative format is DM (Dieselhorst-Martin) quad which consists of two twisted pairs with the twisting at different pitches.

== Audio systems ==
Fig. 5. Microphones connected to star quad cable join together diametrically opposite conductors to maintain balance. This is different from the usage on 4-wire circuits. The colours in this diagram correspond with the colouring in figure 2.

An example of balanced lines is the connection of microphones to a mixer in professional systems. Classically, both dynamic and condenser microphones used transformers to provide a differential-mode signal. While transformers are still used in the large majority of modern dynamic microphones, more recent condenser microphones are more likely to use electronic drive circuitry. Each leg, irrespective of any signal, should have an identical impedance to ground. Pair cable (or a pair-derivative such as star quad) is used to maintain the balanced impedances and close twisting of the cores ensures that any interference is common to both conductors. Providing that the receiving end (usually a mixing console) does not disturb the line balance, and is able to ignore common-mode (noise) signals, and can extract differential ones, then the system will have excellent immunity to induced interference.

Typical professional audio sources, such as microphones, have three-pin XLR connectors. One connects to the shield or chassis ground, while the other two are for the signal conductors. The signal wires can carry two copies of the same signal with opposite polarity (differential signalling) but need not do so. They are often termed "hot" and "cold," and the AES14-1992(r2004) Standard [and EIA Standard RS-297-A] suggest that the pin that carries the positive signal that results from a positive air pressure on a transducer will be deemed 'hot'. Pin 2 has been designated as the 'hot' pin, and that designation serves useful for keeping a consistent polarity in the rest of the system. Since these conductors travel the same path from source to destination, the assumption is that any interference is induced upon both conductors equally. The appliance receiving the signals compares the difference between the two signals (often with disregard to electrical ground) allowing the appliance to ignore any induced electrical noise. Any induced noise would be present in equal amounts and in identical polarity on each of the balanced signal conductors, so the two signals’ difference from each other would be unchanged. The successful rejection of induced noise from the desired signal depends in part on the balanced signal conductors receiving the same amount and type of interference. This typically leads to twisted, braided, or co-jacketed cables for use in balanced signal transmission.

== Balanced and differential ==
Many explanations of balanced lines assume symmetric signals (i.e. signals equal in magnitude but of opposite polarity) but this can lead to confusion of the two concepts—signal symmetry and balanced lines are quite independent of each other. Essential in a balanced line is identical impedances in the two conductors in the driver, line and receiver (impedance balancing). These conditions ensure that external noise affects each leg of the line equally and thus appears as a common-mode signal that is rejected by the receiver. There are balanced drive circuits that have excellent common-mode impedance balancing between the legs but do not provide symmetric signals. Symmetric differential signals concern headroom and are not necessary for interference rejection.

== Baluns ==
Interfacing balanced and unbalanced lines requires a balun. For example, baluns can be used to send line level audio or E-carrier level 1 signals over coaxial cable (which is unbalanced) through 300 feet (91 m) of balanced category 5 cable by using a pair of baluns at each end of the CAT5 run. As the signal travels through the balanced line, noise is induced and added to the signal. As the CAT5 line is carefully impedance balanced, the noise induces equal (common-mode) voltages in both conductors. At the receiving end, the balun responds only to the difference in voltage between the two conductors, thus rejecting the noise picked up along the way and leaving the original signal intact.

A once common application of a radio frequency balun was found at the antenna terminals of a television receiver. Typically, a 300-ohm balanced twin lead antenna input could only be connected to a coaxial cable from a cable TV system through a balun.

== Characteristic impedance ==
The characteristic impedance $Z_0$ of a transmission line is an important parameter at higher frequencies of operation. For a parallel 2-wire transmission line,

$$Z_0 = \frac{1}{\pi}\sqrt{\frac{\mu}{\epsilon}} \ln\left(\frac{l}{R} + \sqrt{\left(\frac{l}{R}\right)^2-1}~\right),$$

where $l$ is half the distance between the wire centres, $R$ is the wire radius and $\mu$, $\epsilon$ are respectively the permeability and permittivity of the surrounding medium. A commonly used approximation that is valid when the wire separation is much larger than the wire radius and in the absence of magnetic materials is

$$Z_0 = \frac{120 ~ \Omega}{\sqrt{\epsilon_r}}\ln\left(\frac{2l}{R}\right),$$

where $\epsilon_r$ is the relative permittivity of the surrounding medium.

== Electric power lines ==
In electric power transmission, the three conductors used for three-phase power transmission are referred to as a balanced line since the instantaneous sum of the three line voltages is nominally zero. However, balance in this field refers to the symmetry of the source and load: it has nothing to do with the impedance balance of the line itself, as the term is used in telecommunications.

For the transmission of single-phase electric power as used for railway electrification, two conductors are used to carry in-phase and out-of-phase voltages such that the line is balanced.

Bipolar HVDC lines, in which each pole is operated with the same voltage toward ground but opposite polarity, are also balanced lines.

== See also ==
- Differential pair
- Twinaxial cabling
- Twisted-pair cable

=== Balanced transmission standards ===
- Ethernet over twisted pair
- RS-422
- RS-485
- Low-voltage differential signalling (LVDS)
