= Hanco International =

In 1926, Frank Hannon opened a small electrical shop in Canton, Ohio. The northeast Ohio region is well known for mineral resources of clay, coal, and limestone as well as the steel, brick and rubber industries. F.R. Hannon & Sons was the trade name created to serve these local industries. These local products and services evolved into what is known around the world today as Hanco International ().

Throughout the years, many different products such as stack draft fans, kiln cooling fans, and quick disconnect plugs were all manufactured. In the late 1940s, Hanco developed several products that continue in production today.

Today, Hanco International products are sold and serviced throughout the world.

== The Flux-Powered Screen Heating System ==
Not only was Hanco International the first to offer a heated screen system, but in 1961, Thomas Hannon (Frank's son), patented the Flux-Power Screen Heating System and the method associated with it, along with innovating the a clamp bar to assure better results. Electrically heated screens allow for accurate sizing of aggregates and raw materials in a variety of industries.

== PPE Testing Equipment ==
The company has also diversified itself early on by offering high voltage di-electric testing machines which were developed for production testing of linemen's rubber gloves, as well as other protective equipment used in the power utility industry. Hanco has also engineered and manufactured specialty electrical control systems for a variety of industries and applications.

== Gallery ==
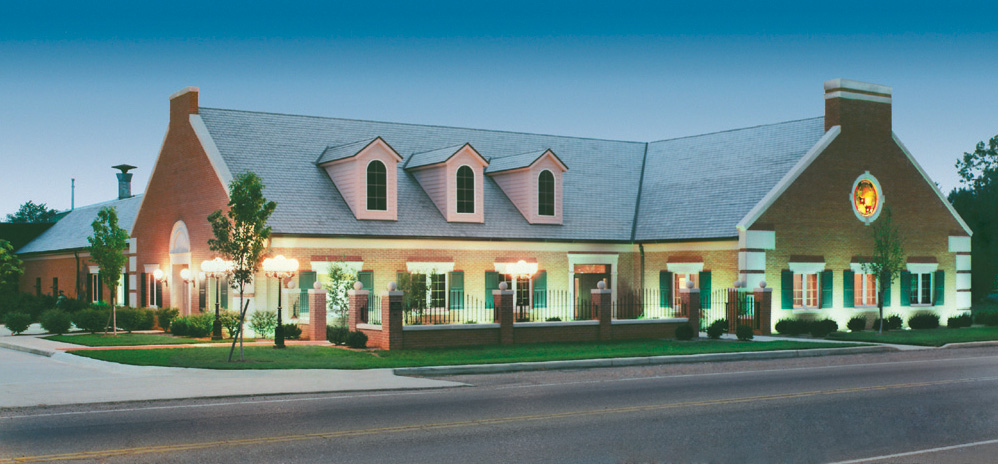
Corporate Headquarters (Canton, Ohio)

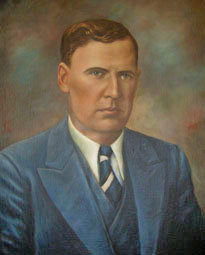
Frank Hannon
