= Balanced circuit =

Electronic circuit with two signal transmission lines of matching impedance

A signal transmitted over a balanced line. The signal is kept intact while the noise (which appears as a common-mode signal at the receiving end) is rejected perfectly.

In electrical engineering, a balanced circuit is electronic circuitry for use with a balanced line, or the balanced line itself. Balanced lines are a common method of transmitting many types of electrical signals between two points on two wires. In a balanced line, the two signal lines are of a matched impedance to help ensure that interference, induced in the line, is common-mode and can be removed at the receiving end by circuitry with good common-mode rejection. To maintain the balance, circuit blocks which interface to the line or are connected in the line must also be balanced.

Balanced lines work because the interfering noise from the surrounding environment induces equal noise voltages into both wires. By measuring the voltage difference between the two wires at the receiving end, the original signal is recovered while the noise is rejected. Any inequality in the noise induced in each wire is an imbalance and will result in the noise not being fully rejected. One requirement for balance is that both wires are an equal distance from the noise source. This is often achieved by placing the wires as close together as possible and twisting them together. Another requirement is that the impedance to ground (or to whichever reference point is being used by the difference detector) is the same for both conductors at all points along the length of the line. If one wire has a higher impedance to ground it will tend to have a higher noise induced, destroying the balance.

== Balance and symmetry ==
Example of 4 different circuit configurations, using a low-pass filter, to demonstrate. Fig. 1. Unbalanced, asymmetrical circuit. Fig. 2. Unbalanced, symmetrical circuit. Fig. 3. Balanced, asymmetrical circuit. Fig. 4. Balanced, symmetrical circuit.

A balanced circuit will normally show a symmetry of its components about a horizontal line midway between the two conductors (example in figure 3). This is different from what is normally meant by a symmetrical circuit, which is a circuit showing symmetry of its components about a vertical line at its midpoint. An example of a symmetrical circuit is shown in figure 2. Circuits designed for use with balanced lines will often be designed to be both balanced and symmetrical as shown in figure 4. The advantages of symmetry are that the same impedance is presented at both ports and that the circuit has the same effect on signals travelling in both directions on the line.

Balance and symmetry are usually associated with reflected horizontal and vertical physical symmetry respectively as shown in figures 1 to 4. However, physical symmetry is not a necessary requirement for these conditions. It is only necessary that the electrical impedances are symmetrical. It is possible to design circuits that are not physically symmetrical but which have equivalent impedances which are symmetrical.

== Differential signals and balanced circuits ==
A differential signal is one where the voltages on each wire are symmetrical with respect to ground (or some other reference). That is, the signals are inverted with respect to each other. A balanced circuit is a circuit where the two sides have identical transmission characteristics in all respects. A balanced line is a line in which the two wires will carry balanced currents (that is, equal and opposite currents) when differential (symmetrical) voltages are applied. The condition for balance of lines and circuits will be met, in the case of passive circuitry, if the impedances are balanced. The line and circuit remain balanced, and the benefits of common-mode noise rejection continue to apply, whether or not the applied signal is itself differential (symmetrical), always provided that the generator producing that signal maintains the impedance balance of the line.

== Driving and receiving circuits ==
Fig. 5. Balanced line connected passively using transformers.

Fig. 6. Balanced line connected to active balanced circuitry.

Fig. 7. Balanced line actively driven with an asymmetrical signal, but connected to balanced impedances.

There are a number of ways that a balanced line can be driven and the signal detected. In all methods, for the continued benefit of good noise immunity, it is essential that the driving and receiving circuit maintain the impedance balance of the line. It is also essential that the receiving circuit detects only differential signals and rejects common-mode signals. It is not essential (although it is often the case) that the transmitted signal is balanced, that is, symmetrical about ground.

=== Transformer balance ===
The conceptually simplest way to connect to a balanced line is through transformers at each end shown in figure 5. Transformers were the original method of making such connections in telephony, and before the advent of active circuitry were the only way. In the telephony application they are known as repeating coils. Transformers have the additional advantage of completely isolating (or "floating") the line from earth and earth loop currents, which are an undesirable possibility with other methods.

The side of the transformer facing the line, in a good quality design, will have the winding laid in two parts (often with a centre tap provided) which are carefully balanced to maintain the line balance. Line side and equipment side windings are more useful concepts than the more usual primary and secondary windings when discussing these kinds of transformers. At the sending end the line side winding is the secondary, but at the receiving end the line side winding is the primary. When discussing a two-wire circuit primary and secondary cease to have any meaning at all, since signals are flowing in both directions at once.

The equipment side winding of the transformer does not need to be so carefully balanced. In fact, one leg of the equipment side can be earthed without effecting the balance on the line as shown in figure 5. With transformers the sending and receiving circuitry can be entirely unbalanced with the transformer providing the balancing.

=== Active balance ===
Active balance is achieved using differential amplifiers at each end of the line. An op-amp implementation of this is shown in figure 6, other circuitry is possible. Unlike transformer balance, there is no isolation of the circuitry from the line. Each of the two wires is driven by an op amp circuit which are identical except that one is inverting and one is non-inverting. Each one produces an asymmetrical signal individually but together they drive the line with a symmetrical signal. The output impedance of each amp is equal so the impedance balance of the line is maintained.

While it is not possible to create an isolated drive with op-amp circuitry alone, it is possible to create a floating output. This is important if one leg of the line might become grounded or connected to some other voltage reference. Grounding one leg of the line in the circuit of figure 6 will result in the line voltage being halved since only one op-amp is now providing signal. To achieve a floating output additional feedback paths are required between the two op-amps resulting in a more complex circuit than figure 6, but still avoiding the expense of a transformer. A floating op-amp output can only float within the limits of the op-amp's supply rails. An isolated output can be achieved without transformers with the addition of opto-isolators.

=== Impedance balance ===
As noted above, it is possible to drive a balanced line with a single-ended signal and still maintain the line balance. This is represented in outline in figure 7. The amplifier driving one leg of the line through a resistor is assumed to be an ideal (that is, zero output impedance) single-ended output amp. The other leg is connected from ground through another resistor of the same value. The impedance to ground of both legs is the same and the line remains balanced. The receiving amplifier still rejects any common-mode noise as it has a differential input. On the other hand, the line signal is not symmetrical. The voltages at the input to the two legs, V_{+} and V_{−} are given by;

$$V_+ = V_\mathrm {in} \frac{Z_\mathrm {in}+R_1}{Z_\mathrm {in}+2R_1}$$

$$V_- = V_\mathrm {in} \frac{R_1}{Z_\mathrm {in}+2R_1}$$

Where Z_{in} is the input impedance of the line. These are clearly not symmetrical since V_{−} is much smaller than V_{+}. They are not even opposite polarities. In audio applications V_{−} is usually so small it can be taken as zero.

== Balanced to unbalanced interfacing ==
A circuit that has the specific purpose of allowing interfacing between balanced and unbalanced circuits is called a balun. A balun could be a transformer with one leg earthed on the unbalanced side as described in the transformer balance section above. Other circuits are possible such as autotransformers or active circuits.

== Connectors ==
Common connectors used with balanced circuits include modular connectors on telephone instruments and broadband data, and XLR connectors for professional audio. 1/4" tip/ring/sleeve (TRS) phone connectors were once widely used on manual switchboards and other telephone infrastructure. Such connectors are now more commonly seen in miniature sizes (2.5 and 3.5 mm) being used for unbalanced stereo audio; however, professional audio equipment such as mixing consoles still commonly use balanced and unbalanced "line-level" connections with 1/4" phone jacks.

== Bibliography ==
- Rod Elliot, Uwe Beis, "Balanced transmitter and receiver II", Elliot Sound Products, 1 April 2002, accessed and archived 7 October 2015.
- A. J. Peyton, V. Walsh, Analog electronics with Op Amps: a source book of practical circuits, Cambridge University Press, 1993 ISBN 0-521-33604-X.
- Mike Rivers, "Balanced and unbalanced connections", Presonus, accessed and archived 7 October 2015.
- G. Randy Slone, Electricity and electronics, McGraw-Hill Professional, 2000 ISBN 0-07-136057-3.
- Daniel M. Thompson, Understanding audio: getting the most out of your project or professional recording studio, Hal Leonard Corporation, 2005 ISBN 0-634-00959-1.
- Gabriel Vasilescu, Electronic noise and interfering signals, Springer, 2005 ISBN 3-540-40741-3.
- Jerry C. Whitaker, The resource handbook of electronics, CRC Press, 2001 ISBN 0-8493-8353-6.
- Jerry C. Whitaker, Master handbook of audio production: a guide to standards, equipment, and system design, McGraw-Hill Professional, 2003 ISBN 0-07-140876-2.
