= Differential pair =

Differential pair may refer to:

- A pair of conductors used in differential signalling
- Long-tailed pair, a two-transistor circuit in a differential amplifier
