= Battleshort =

Emergency override of safety features to complete a mission

Battleshort (sometimes "battle short") is a condition in which some military equipment can be placed so it does not shut down when circumstances would be damaging to the equipment or personnel. The origin of the term is to bridge or "short" the fuses of an electrical apparatus before entering combat, so that the fuse will not blow and stop the equipment from operating.

According to Allied Ordnance Publication AOP-38-3, a NATO publication, a battleshort is "The capability to bypass certain safety features in a system to ensure completion of the mission without interruption due to the safety feature." It also says, "Examples of bypassed safety features are circuit overload protection, and protection against overheating".

In peaceful situations one would want equipment to shut down so it is not damaged. In a battle or emergency, where the survival of the vessel (or other protected asset) is dependent upon the continued operation of the equipment, it is sometimes wiser to risk equipment damage than have the equipment shut down when it is needed. For example, the electrical drives to elevate and traverse the guns of a combat warship may have "battleshort" fuses, which are simply copper bars of the correct size to fit the fuse holders, as failure to return fire in a combat situation is a greater threat to the ship and crew than damaging or overheating the electrical motors.

Battleshorts have been used in some non-combat situations as well, including the Firing Room/Mission Control spaces at NASA during the crewed Apollo missions — specifically the moon landings. Similar measures can be used on the pumps for fire sprinkler systems, with protective devices bypassed when alarms are activated. The justification is that any damage to the pumps is less than the potential loss of the building.

== See also ==
- Fail safe
- Kill switch
- War emergency power
- USS South Dakota (BB-57), which suffered an electrical problem while under fire during the Naval Battle of Guadalcanal
