= Center tap =

Contact made to a point halfway along a winding of a transformer or inductor

Diagram of center-tapped transformer

In electronics, a center tap (CT) is a contact made to a point halfway along a winding of a transformer or inductor, or along the element of a resistor or a potentiometer.

Taps are sometimes used on inductors for the coupling of signals, and may not necessarily be at the half-way point, but rather, closer to one end. A common application of this is in the Hartley oscillator. Inductors with taps also permit the transformation of the amplitude of alternating current (AC) voltages for the purpose of power conversion, in which case, they are referred to as autotransformers, since there is only one winding. An example of an autotransformer is an automobile ignition coil.

Potentiometer tapping provides one or more connections along the device's element, along with the usual connections at each of the two ends of the element, and the slider connection. Potentiometer taps allow for circuit functions that would otherwise not be available with the usual construction of just the two end connections and one slider connection.

== Volts center tapped ==
Volts center tapped (VCT) describes the voltage output of a center tapped transformer. For example, a 24 VCT transformer will measure 24 VAC across the outer two taps (winding as a whole), and 12 VAC from each outer tap to the center-tap (half winding). These two 12 VAC supplies are 180 degrees out of phase with each other, measured with respect to the tap, thus making it easy to derive positive and negative 12 volt DC power supplies from them.

== Applications and history ==
- In vacuum tube audio amplifiers, center-tapped transformers were sometimes used as the phase inverter to drive the two output tubes of a push-pull stage. The technique is nearly as old as electronic amplification and is well documented, for example, in The Radiotron Designer's Handbook, Third Edition of 1940. This technique was carried over into transistor designs also, part of the reason for which was that capacitors were large, expensive and unreliable. However, since that era, capacitors have become vastly smaller, cheaper and more reliable, whereas transformers are still relatively expensive. Furthermore, as designers acquired more experience with transistors, they stopped trying to treat them like tubes. Coupling a class A intermediate amplification stage to a class AB power stage using a transformer doesn't make sense anymore even in small systems powered from a single-voltage supply. Modern higher-end equipment is based on dual-supply designs which eliminates coupling. It is possible for an amplifier, from the input all the way to the loudspeaker, to be DC coupled without any capacitance or inductance. Nevertheless, this use is still relevant in the 21st century because tubes and tube amplifiers continue to be produced for niche markets.
- In analog telecommunications systems center-tapped transformers can be used to provide a DC path around an AC coupled amplifier for signalling purposes.
- Three wire power distribution can be used, e. g. with 240 VCT to provide two 120 VAC circuits in US/Canada.
- Low-frequency mains transformers often have center taps. Historically, rectifier costs were high, so DC power supplies with a center-tapped transformer and two diodes justified extra cost of copper windings and iron laminations, using only half of the secondary coil per half-cycle. Consumer products like cassette recorders often used 18 VCT transformers to obtain 9 VDC until the 1980s. With four diodes, both halves can be used, which leads to efficient designs for symmetrical voltages with the center tap as common ground. E. g. in arcade machines like Atari Asteroids (1979), a 36 VCT transformer is used in four-diode configuration to produce +/- 15 VDC (after regulation), while the same power supply provides 10.3 VDC unregulated from a two-diode configuration. In the late 1970s, it became a better business case and simpler assembly to use bridge rectifiers.
- In switch-mode power supplies, center-tapped transformers are often used, sometimes with single diodes or a dual diode half-bridge to optimize their dynamic electromagnetic behavior at the expense of the extra windings.
- Phantom power can be supplied to a condenser microphone using center tap transformers. One method, called "direct center tap" uses two center tap transformers, one at the microphone body and one at the microphone preamp. Filtered DC voltage is connected to the microphone preamp center tap, and the microphone body center tap is grounded through the cable shield. The second method uses the same center tap transformer topology at the microphone body, but at the microphone preamp, a matched pair of resistors spanning the signal lines in series creates an "artificial center tap".
