= Pathlight Technology =

Pathway Technologies
- Founded: 1994
- Founder: Said Rahmani
- Defunct: 2001
- Fate: acquired by ADIC
- Headquarters: Ithaca, New York

Pathlight Technology was a pioneer in the field of Storage Area Networks. Based in Ithaca, NY, Pathlight was formed in 1994 as a spin-out from Ironics, a manufacturer of VME computer, IO and memory boards.

Pathlight was involved in the development of Serial Storage Architecture products, and in Fibre Channel products.

Pathlight merged with ADIC in 2001.

== History ==
Pathlight Technologies was founded by Said Rahmani in 1994.

Between 1997 and 2000, Rand Capital participated in four rounds of investments in Pathlight Technology.

ADIC acquired Pathlight in January 2001 for a reported $265 million. Said Rahmani became VP of R&D at ADIC after the acquisition.

== Products ==
One of the significant products from Pathlight was the SAN Gateway, which provided multi-directional bridging between multiple Parallel SCSI ports and multiple Fibre Channel ports. IBM teamed with Pathlight to provide the SAN Data Gateway (IBM Product 2108-G07) and SAN Data Gateway Router (IBM Product 2108-R03).
