= Four-wire circuit =

In telecommunications, a four-wire circuit is a two-way circuit using two paths so arranged that the respective signals are transmitted in one direction only by one path and in the other direction by the other path. The four-wire circuit gets its name from the fact that is uses four conductors to create two complete electrical circuits, one for each direction. The two separate circuits (channels) allow full-duplex operation with low crosstalk.

In telephony a four-wire circuit was historically used to transport and switch baseband audio signals in the phone company telephone exchange before the advent of digital modulation and the electronic switching system eliminated baseband audio from the telco plant except for the local loop. The local loop is a two-wire circuit for one reason only: to save copper. Using half the number of copper wire conductors per circuit means that the infrastructure cost for wiring each circuit is halved. Although a lower quality circuit, the local loop allows full duplex operation by using a telephone hybrid to keep near and far voice levels equivalent.

As the public switched telephone network expanded in size and scope, using many individual wires inside the telco plant became so impractical and labor-intensive that in-office and inter-office signal wiring progressed to high bandwidth coaxial cable (still a popular interconnection method in the 21st century, used with the Lucent 5ESS Class-5 telephone switch to present day), microwave radio relay and ultimately fiber-optic communication for high-speed trunk circuits. At the end of the 20th century, four-wire circuits saw renewed growth for corporate local loop service for use in dedicated line service for computer modems to interconnect company computer networks and to connect networks to an Internet service provider for Internet connectivity before commodity DSL and cable modem connectivity was widely available.

== See also ==
- Transmission line
- Star quad cable
