= Two-wire circuit =

Telecommunications circuit which can transmit in two directions simultaneously

In telecommunication, a two-wire circuit is characterized by supporting transmission in two directions simultaneously, as opposed to four-wire circuits, which have separate pairs for transmit and receive. The subscriber local loop from the telco central office are almost all two wire for analog baseband voice calls (and some digital services like ISDN), and converted to four-wire at the line card back when telephone switching was performed on baseband audio. Today the audio is digitized and processed completely in the digital domain upstream from the local loop.

The reason for using two wires rather than four is simple economics—half the materials cost half as much to purchase and install. Note the use of the past-tense "cost," as installation of two-wire copper local loops for telephony was done primarily during the mid 20th century. In the first world there is no new infrastructure planning for new copper-based technology, and as customers are migrating to cellular telephony and high-speed Internet, wireline carriers are abandoning their copper local loops, tearing out the copper and replacing it with fiber-optic cable and/or selling the rights-of-way to third parties for private use. In developing nations, wireless communications are considered to be the most cost-effective from an infrastructure perspective. Two-wire circuits in new installations are limited to intercom and military field telephone applications, though these too are being supplanted by modern digital communication modes.

To communicate in both directions in the same wire pair, conversion between four-wire and two-wire was necessary, both at the telephone and at the central office. A hybrid coil accomplishes the conversion for both. At the central office, it is part of a four-wire terminating set, more often as part of a line card. A modern line card has no two-to-four wire conversion whatsoever; it is strictly an analog/digital interface to a system that has a completely digital and integrated signal path internally. Using actual wires to circuit switch a telephone call became obsolete when the crossbar switch (a mechanical system) was replaced by 4ESS electronic switches in the 1970s by the Bell System in the US. The old telephone hybrids of yore have been replaced by inexpensive IC chip-based components that perform the same functions at greatly reduced cost. When personal computing and the Internet became popular at the end of the 20th century, the inductive load of traditional hybrids became a liability for computer modem users, and remaining loading coils in subscriber lines were scrapped.

== Impedance standards ==
Different countries have different standards for telephone impedance.

Country	Termination nickname	Summary	Reference
Australia	TN12	220Ω + ( 820Ω || 120 nF )	AS/ACIF S002
Canada	600Ω	600Ω	CS-03 Part I
European Union	CTR21*	270Ω + ( 750Ω || 150 nF )	ETSI ES 202 971 V1.2.1
New Zealand	BT3	370Ω + ( 620Ω || 310 nF )	PTC200
North America	600Ω	600Ω	TIA-470.210

- The European regulatory requirement CTR 21 has been officially withdrawn. Some manufacturers prefer to continue meeting CTR 21, but there is little reason to do so.
