= Stray voltage =

Electrical potential between unexpected places

Stray voltage is the occurrence of electrical potential between two objects that ideally should not have any voltage difference between them. Small voltages often exist between two grounded objects in separate locations by the normal current flow in the power system. Contact voltage is a better defined term when large voltage appear as a result of a fault. Contact voltage on the enclosure of electrical equipment can appear from a fault in the electrical power system, such as a failure of insulation.

A fallen power conductor from a transmission line forces current through the earth back to the source, which is connected to the earth. The resistance of the earth to current produces a voltage difference between the point of contact and distant earth. If the rate of change of voltage with distance is large, a dangerous potential may exist between the feet of a person in the area.

== Terminology ==
The terminology, stray voltage may be used in any case of undesirable elevated electrical potential. More precise terminology gives an indication of the source of the voltage. Neutral to earth voltage (NEV) specifically refers to a difference in potential between a locally grounded object and the grounded return conductor, or neutral, of an electrical system. The neutral is theoretically at 0 V potential, as any grounded object, but current flows on the neutral back to the source, somewhat elevating the neutral voltage. NEV is the product of current flowing on the neutral and the finite, non-zero impedance of the neutral conductor between a given point and its source, often a distant electrical substation. NEV differs from accidentally-energized objects because it is an unavoidable result of normal system operation, not an accident or a fault in materials or design.

== Definitions ==
=== Official definition (draft) ===
In 2005, the Institute of Electrical and Electronics Engineers (IEEE) convened Working Group 1695 in an attempt to lay down definitions and guidelines for mitigating the various phenomena referred to as "stray voltage". The working group attempted to distinguish between the terms stray voltage and contact voltage as follows:

- Stray voltage is defined as "A voltage resulting from the normal delivery and/or use of electricity (usually smaller than 10 volts) that may be present between two conductive surfaces that can be simultaneously contacted by members of the general public and/or their animals. Stray voltage is caused by primary and/or secondary return current, and power system induced currents, as these currents flow through the impedance of the intended return pathway, its parallel conductive pathways, and conductive loops in close proximity to the power system. Stray voltage is not related to power system faults, and is generally not considered hazardous."
- Contact voltage is defined as "A voltage resulting from abnormal power system conditions that may be present between two conductive surfaces that can be simultaneously contacted by members of the general public and/or their animals. Contact voltage is caused by power system fault current as it flows through the impedance of available fault current pathways. Contact voltage is not related to normal system operation and can exist at levels that may be hazardous."

=== Working definition ===
In spite of the above definitions, the term stray voltage continues to be used by both utility workers and the general public for all occurrences of unwanted excess electricity. For example, at the annual "Jodie S. Lane Stray Voltage Detection, Mitigation & Prevention Conference", held at the Con Edison headquarters in New York City in April 2009, the presidents of most major utilities from throughout the United States and Canada continued to use stray voltage for all occurrences of unwanted excess electricity. The term contact voltage was used only once, possibly because "contact voltage" is generally the fault of the supply, network, or installation company. Few companies are willing to openly discuss their faults, let alone those that are seen as life-threatening. It would seem that stray voltage is now the common term for all unwanted voltage leakage because it categorises the fault as part of normal operation and so limits liability.

In New York City, a woman, Jodie S. Lane, was electrocuted in January 2004 by a five-foot by eight-foot metal road utility vault plate that was energized by an "improperly insulated wire." In the coverage of her death and the growing concern regarding the role of public utilities in electrical safety in the urban environment, both the media and the New York State regulatory agency used stray voltage for neutral-to-earth voltage (NEV), but conceded that the notoriety of the Lane incident had caused stray voltage to be a term that is well recognized by the public.

The regulator then used stray voltage to refer to any "voltage conditions on electric facilities that should not ordinarily exist. These conditions may be due to one or more factors, including, but not limited to, damaged cables, deteriorated, frayed or missing insulation, improper maintenance, or improper installation." In the same document, the commission accepted NEV to be a naturally occurring condition.

Since then, the term had at least two very different definitions, which confused utilities, regulators, and the public. The term "stray voltage" is commonly used for all unwanted electrical leakage, by both the general public and many electrical utility professionals. Other more esoteric phenomenon that also result in elevated voltages on normally non-energized surfaces, are also referred to as “stray voltage.” Examples are voltage from capacitive coupling, current induced by power lines, EMF, lightning, earth potential rise, and problems stemming from open (disconnected) neutrals.

== Causes ==
=== Coupled voltages ===
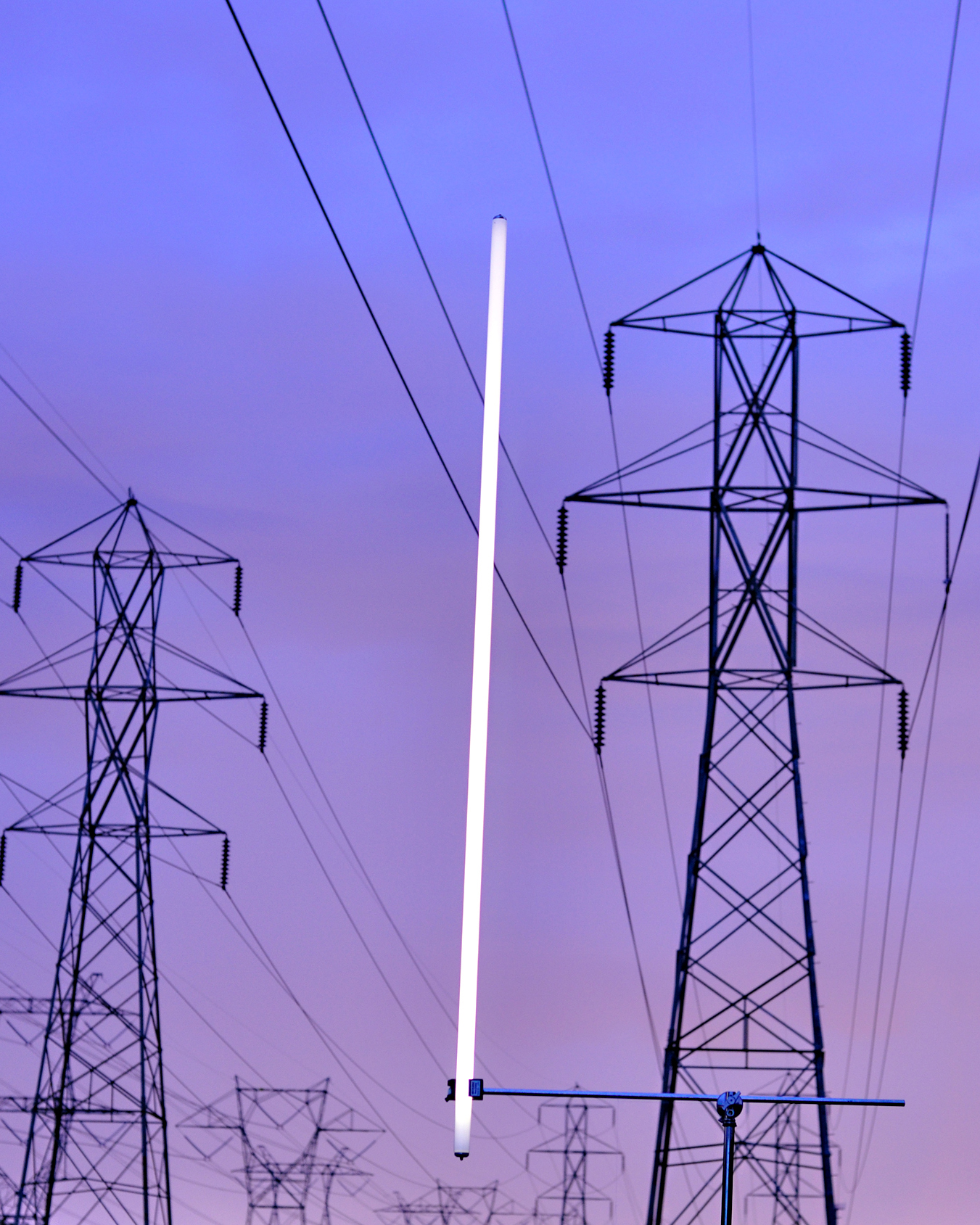
The very small capacitance between overhead lines and a fluorescent lamp tube (in the foreground of the photo) provides enough current to cause the lamp to glow.

Ungrounded metal objects close to electric field sources such as neon signs or conductors carrying alternating currents may have measurable voltage levels caused by capacitive coupling. Since voltages detected by high-impedance instruments disappear or become greatly reduced when a low impedance is substituted, the effect is sometimes called phantom voltage (or ghost voltage). The term is often used by electricians, and might be seen, for example, when measuring the voltage at a lighting fixture after removing the bulb. It is common to measure phantom voltages of 50–90 V in testing the wiring of ordinary 120 V circuits with a high-impedance instrument. The voltage produced may read almost to the full supply voltage, but the capacitance or mutual inductance between the wires of building wiring systems is typically quite low and incapable of supplying significant amounts of current.

However, in overhead transmission work on or near high-voltage lines, safety rules require connecting a conductor to earth ground during maintenance. That is since induced voltages and currents on a conductor may cause electrocution or serious injury.

=== Capacitive leakage through insulation ===
Alternating current is different from direct current in that the current can flow through what would ordinarily seem to be a physical barrier. In a series circuit, a capacitor blocks direct current but passes alternating current.

In power transmission systems, one side of the circuit, known as the neutral, is grounded to dissipate static electricity and to reduce hazardous voltages caused by insulation failure and other electrical faults.

Even a person standing on an insulated surface may get a shock only by touching the hot wire because of the person's body being capacitively coupled to the ground upon which the person stands.

=== Induced voltages ===
Classical electromagnetic induction can occur when long conductors form an open grounded loop under and parallel to transmission or distribution lines. In those cases, current is induced in the loop when a person makes contact with it and ground. Since this involves real current flow, it is potentially hazardous. This type of induced current occurs most often on long fences and distribution lines built under high-power transmission lines.

=== Degraded insulation on power conductors ===
Stray voltage may leak via damaged or degraded insulation. Failing insulation is essentially a high impedance fault which will allow current to flow through any available path to ground, a condition which can cause shocks or fires if left unmitigated. This leakage can occur when there is damage caused by physical, thermal, or chemical stresses to insulation on power lines, especially but not limited to underground or underwater cables. Examples of this damage are swollen or cracked insulation from overheating, abrasions caused by digging or ground seizing, and corrosion damage from salt or oil exposure. Electrical leakage can occur also from moisture, salt, dust, and dirt buildup on open air insulators in overhead power distribution. If the leakage in these cases is severe enough, it can lead to a utility pole fire.

=== Leakage from single-wire earth return ===
The term "stray voltage" is used for the gradient (rate of change with respect to distance) of electrical potential in the surface of the soil, associated with single-wire earth return electricity distribution systems used in some rural locations. This gradient is low at points far away from the earth return connections, but increases near the ground rods where the metallic circuit enters the earth.

=== Neutral return currents through the ground ===
In three phase four-wire ("wye") electrical power systems, when the load on the phases is not exactly equal, there is some current in the neutral conductor. Because both the primary and secondary of the distribution transformer are grounded, and the primary ground is grounded at more than one point, the earth forms a parallel return path for the neutral current, allowing part of the neutral current to continuously flow through the earth. This arrangement is partially responsible for stray voltage.

Stray voltage is a result of the design of a 4 wire distribution system and as such has existed as long as such systems have been used. Stray voltage became a problem for the dairy industry some time after electric milking machines were introduced, and large numbers of animals were simultaneously in contact with metal objects grounded to the electric distribution system and the earth. Numerous studies document the causes, physiological effects, and prevention, of stray voltage in the farm environment. Today, stray voltage on farms is regulated by state governments and controlled by the design of equipotential planes in areas where livestock eat, drink or give milk. Commercially available neutral isolators also prevent elevated potentials on the utility system neutral from raising the voltage of farm neutral or ground wires.

=== Railway stray current ===
Typically a rail transit systems will have at least one of the rails as a return conductor for the traction current. This arrangement is common, based on economic considerations, since it does not require the installation of an additional return conductor. This rail is in contact with the earth at many places throughout its length. Since current will follow every parallel path between source and load, some part of the traction current will also flow through the earth. This is normally referred to as leakage current or stray current. The amount of leaking current depends on the conductance of the return tracks compared to the soil; and on the quality of the insulation between the tracks and soil. Where the railway uses direct current, this stray current can cause damage to other buried metallic objects by electrolysis and accelerate corrosion of metal objects in contact with the soil.

== Stray Voltage Effects ==
=== Electrolysis and corrosion ===
Dissimilar buried metals such as copper and steel can function as the poles of a galvanic cell, using moist soil as the electrolyte. Stray direct currents in soil may counteract the anti-corrosion effect of a cathodic protection system. Design of high voltage direct current transmission systems must take care so that current flowing in the earth does not cause objectionable corrosion to buried objects such as pipelines.

The stray currents from railways create or accelerate the electrolytic corrosion of metallic structures located in the proximity of the transit system. Metal pipes, cables and earthing grids laid in the ground near tracks may have a much shorter usable and safety functional life.

=== Persons ===
Small stray voltages may never be noticed and may be detected only by a voltmeter. Larger stray voltages may have a range of effects, from barely perceptible to dangerous electric shocks, or unintended electrical heating resulting in fires. Normally, metal electrical equipment cases are bonded to ground to prevent a shock hazard if energized conductors accidentally contact the case. Where this bonding is not provided or has failed, a severe hazard of electric shock or electrocution is presented when circuit conductors contact the case.

In any situation where energized equipment is in intimate electrical contact with a person or animal (such as swimming pools, surgery, electric milking machines, car washes, laundries, and many others), particular attention must be paid to elimination of stray voltages. Dry intact skin has a higher resistance than wet skin or a wound, so voltages that would otherwise be unnoticed become significant in a wet or surgical situation. Potential differences between pool water and railings, or shower facilities and grounded drain pipes are common as a result of neutral to earth voltages (NEV). Potential differences can be a major nuisance, but are usually not life-threatening. However, a current carrying conductor with damaged insulation can result in contact voltage in unexpected places. Contact voltage energized metal parts can be very dangerous, and can lead to shock or electrocution. A contact voltage condition can arise spontaneously from mechanical, thermal, or chemical stress on insulation materials, or from unintentional damage from digging activity, freeze-frost seizing, corrosion and collapse of conduit, or even workmanship issues.

Contact voltage energizes objects which are normally safe – metal fences, metal telephone booths, metal street signs, etc. Anywhere buried electric wiring exists, a failure can occur in that wiring and create conditions that allow electricity to flow into the immediate surroundings. Some circuitry systems have protective devices such as circuit breakers or Ground Fault Circuit Interrupters (GFCI), designed to isolate such a fault. However, in the absence of protective devices, a fault will go undetected until it either causes a failure or an energy discharge incident.

=== Farm animals ===
Stray voltage can have harmful effects on animal health and productivity. Some dairy farmers have claimed damage to yields or stock caused by it.

Dr. Douglas J. Reinemann, Professor of Biological Systems Engineering at University of Wisconsin–Madison, reported on stray voltages on dairy farms in 2003. Investigation of stray voltage claims must also consider other animal health concerns.

==== Legal proceedings in Wisconsin ====
In 2003, the Wisconsin Supreme Court upheld a judgement of $1.2 million against the Wisconsin electrical utility WEPCO in Hoffman v. Wisconsin Electric Power Company. The Hoffman family, dairy farmers near New London, had sued WEPCO after several years of declining production. WEPCO had measured on the farm currents because of stray voltage <1 mA, the "level of concern" set by the Public Service Commission of Wisconsin, but the court ruled on procedural grounds that the utility could be found negligent under common law even though they met the state standard. The Hoffmans had presented, the court said, a viable alternative theory that stray voltage had caused them economic harm.

In 2017, a jury sided with farmers Paul and Lyn Halderson for a $4.5 million settlement against Xcel Energy. The Haldersons claimed stray voltage from high voltage power lines hurt their 1,000 cow herd and lowered milk production. The jury found that Xcel subsidiary – Northern States Power Company – was "negligent with respect to the delivery of electrical service." The jury awarded $4.09 million for economic damages and another $409,000 for "inconvenience, annoyance and loss of use and enjoyment" of property.

== Public concerns about stray voltage ==
In metropolitan areas, stray voltage issues became a concern in the 1990s. Many of these areas have large amounts of aging underground and aboveground electrical distribution equipment in crowded public spaces. Even a low rate of insulation failures or current leakage can result in hazardous exposure to the general public.

Consolidated Edison in New York City has had frequent incidents of stray voltage, including the electrocution death of Jodie S. Lane in 2004, while walking her dog in Manhattan. In 2009, the Jodie S. Lane Public Safety Foundation announced a publicly accessible website with maps showing thousands of reported stray voltage locations in New York City. In addition, the Foundation sponsors the "Jodie S. Lane Stray Voltage Detection, Mitigation & Prevention Conference", an annual meeting attended by power utilities and regulators from around the country to discuss stray voltage detection programs. The Foundation also initiated and advocates regular mobile scanning by utility companies for stray voltage hazards.

In Boston, NSTAR Electric (formerly Boston Edison) has also had problems with hazardous stray voltages, which have killed several dogs during the 1990s. As a result, the City of Boston government started a program to detect, report on, and repair stray voltage hazards.

Toronto Hydro pulled all employees off regular duty on the weekend of January 30, 2009 to deal with ongoing stray voltage problems in the city. This came after as many as five children were shocked though none suffered serious injury. The stray voltage problem had claimed the lives of two dogs in the previous few months.

In March 2013, Californian Simona Wilson won a $4 million lawsuit against her power company after stray voltage from an electrical substation near her house repeatedly shocked her and members of her family whenever they were in the shower.

The United States Social Security Administration, Administrative Law Judge, Edward Bergtholdt, in an August 17, 2000 decision awarded Michael Gunner permanent disability from exposure to stray voltage.

== Stray/contact voltage detection ==
Stray voltage is generally discovered during routine electrical work, or as a result of a customer complaint or shock incident. A growing number of utilities in urban areas now conduct routine periodic and systematic active tests for stray voltage (or more specifically, contact voltage) for public safety reasons. Some incipient electrical faults may also be discovered during routine work or inspection programs which are not specifically focused on stray voltage.

Equipment used to detect stray voltage varies, but common devices are electrical tester pens or electric field detectors, with follow-up testing using a low-impedance voltmeter. Electrical tester pens are hand-held devices which detect a potential difference between the user's hand and the object being tested. They generally indicate on contact with an energized object, if the potential difference is above the sensitivity threshold of the device. Reliability of the test can be affected if the user is at an elevated potential him/herself, or if the user is not making firm contact with a bare hand on the reference terminal of the tester.

Capacitive coupling is the mechanism used by electrical tester pen devices. Because the capacitance between an object and a current source is typically small, only very small currents can flow from the energized source to the coupled object. High-impedance digital or analog voltmeters may measure elevated voltages from non-energized objects from the coupling and in effect provide a misleading reading. For that reason, high-impedance voltage measurements of normally non-energized objects must be verified.

Verification of a voltage reading is performed using a low-impedance voltmeter, which usually has a shunt resistor load bridging the voltmeter terminals. Since very little current can flow from a coupled surface through the small shunt or meter resistance, capacitively coupled voltages will collapse to zero, indicating a harmless "false alarm". By contrast, if an object being tested is in contact with a current source, or coupled by a very large capacitance (possible but unlikely in this context), the voltage will drop only slightly as dictated by Ohm's law. In this latter case, real power is being delivered, indicating a potentially hazardous situation.

Electric field detectors detect the electric field strength relative to the user's body or mounting platform. By sensing electric field gradients at a distance, they can detect energized objects without making direct contact, making these instruments useful for scanning or screening large areas for potential electrical hazards. A low electric field reading also provides a definitive indication that no objects are energized within a tested area. Electric field detectors respond to all field sources, and any positive indications must be verified with a low-impedance voltmeter to eliminate false positives. Electric field proximity sensing also has other industrial applications from manufacturing to building security.

Since stray voltage cannot be seen, smelled, or heard, there is no easy way for the public to know when a dangerous condition exists. Periodic testing is an important precaution, but it is possible that a dangerous condition can develop without warning.

== See also ==
- Disturbance voltage
- Earth potential rise
- Earthing system
- Electrical bonding
- Gas leak
- Neutral and ground
- Shaft voltage
