= Ground out =

Ground out may refer to:

- Ground out (baseball), a method of putting out a batter
- Short circuit to earth

== See also ==
- Ground (electricity)
- Ground and neutral
