= Electrical bonding =

Method of protection from electric shock

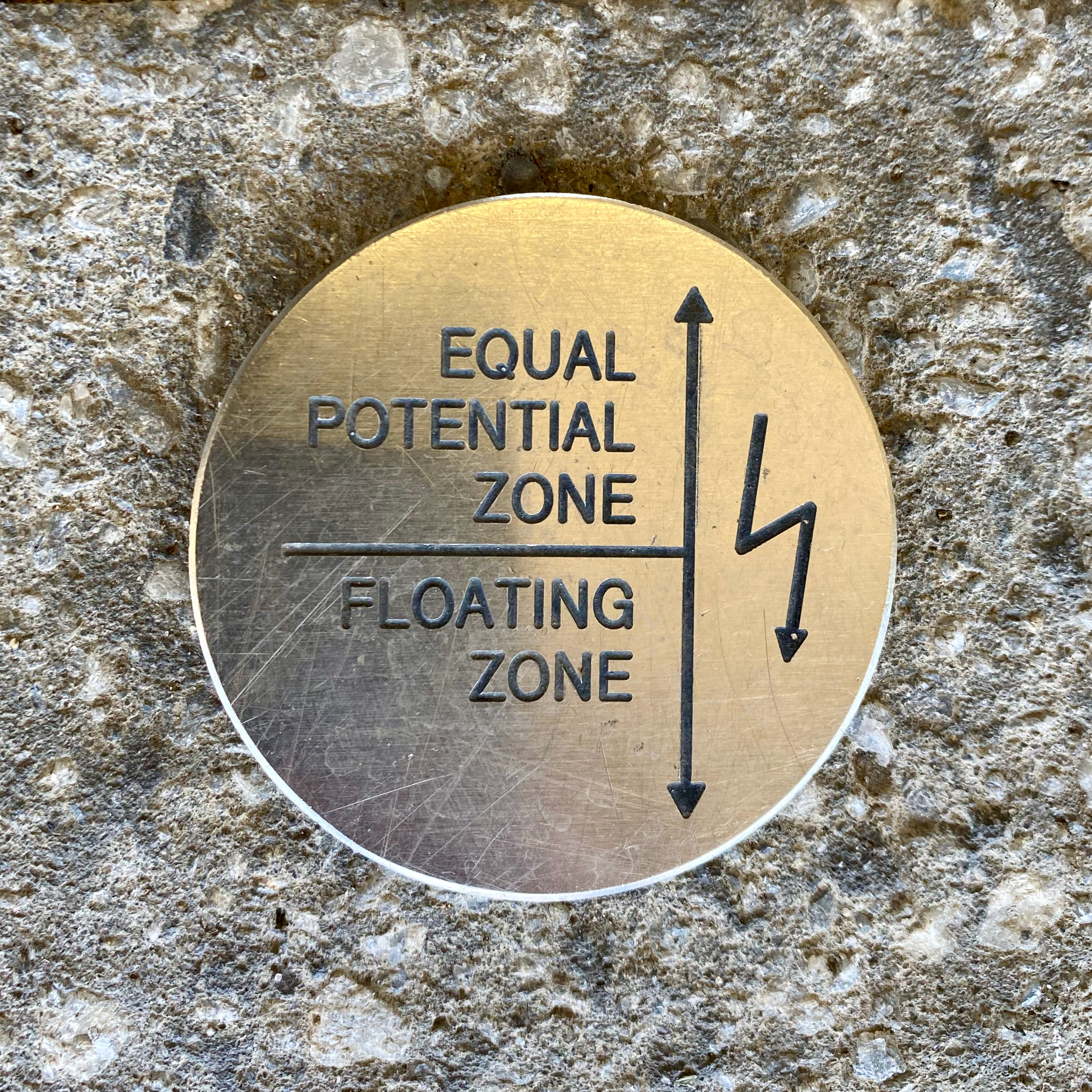
Plaque at train station in Melbourne showing area where all metal objects carry the same electrical potential

Electrical bonding is the practice of intentionally electrically connecting all exposed metal items not designed to carry electricity in a room or building as protection from electric shock. Bonding is also used to minimize electrical arcing between metal surfaces with electrical potential differences. If a failure of electrical insulation occurs, all bonded metal objects in the room will have substantially the same electrical potential, so that an occupant of the room cannot touch two objects with significantly different potentials. Even if the connection to a distant earth is lost, the occupant will be protected from dangerous potential differences.

== Electrical Bonding in Buildings ==
In a building with electricity, it is normal for safety reasons to connect all metal objects such as pipes together to the mains earth to form an equipotential zone. This is done in the UK because many buildings are supplied with a TN−C−S earthing system where the neutral and earth conductors are combined. Close to the electricity meter this conductor is divided into two, the earth and the neutral busbar in the consumer unit. If the ground connection to the neutral is lost, all wiring and other objects tied to the neutral will be energized at the line voltage. Examples of articles that may be bonded include metallic water piping systems, gas piping, ducts for central heating and air conditioning systems, and exposed metal parts of buildings such as handrails, stairs, ladders, platforms, and floors.

== Shock Hazard Prevention ==
A person touching the un-earthed metal casing of an electrical device, while also in contact with a metal object connected to remote earth, is exposed to an electric shock hazard if the device has a fault. If all metal objects are connected, all the metal objects in the building will be at the same potential. It then will not be possible to get a shock by touching two 'earthed' objects at once.

Bonding is particularly important for bathrooms, swimming pools, and fountains. In pools and fountains, any metal object (other than conductors of the power circuit) over a certain size must be bonded to assure that all conductors are at the same potential. Since it is buried in the ground, a pool can be a better ground than the electric panel ground. With all the conducting elements bonded, it is less likely that an electric current will find a path through a swimmer. In concrete pools, even the reinforcing bars of the concrete must be connected to the bonding system to ensure no dangerous potential gradients are produced during a fault.

== How the Earth Protects ==
In a system with a grounded (earthed) neutral, connecting all non-current-carrying metal parts of equipment to earth ground at the main service panel will ensure that current due to faults (such as a "hot" wire touching the frame or chassis of the device) will be diverted to earth. In a TN system where there is a direct connection from the installation earth to the transformer neutral, earthing will allow the branch circuit over-current protection (a fuse or circuit breaker) to detect the fault rapidly and interrupt the circuit.

=== TT Systems and Residual-Current Devices ===
In the case of a TT system where the impedance is high due to the lack of direct connection to the transformer neutral, a residual-current device (RCD) must be used to provide disconnection. RCDs are also used in other situations where rapid disconnection of small earth faults (including a human touching a live wire by accident, or damage) is desired.

=== Relationship Between Bonding and Grounding ===
Electrical bonding pairs with grounding to ensure effective and proper fault protection. Electrical bonding works by connecting parts of the electrical system that are conductive to allow for them to be at the same electrical potential. Grounding works upon this electrical bonding by creating a permanent neutral path that allows for any fault current to flow to the earth. This would reduce the risk of there being drastic changes in voltage difference which creates a hazard. With the combination of proper electrical bonding and grounding, it decreases the overall risk of any electric shock or fault currents from harming a human.

== Equipotential Bonding ==
Equipotential bonding involves electrically connecting metalwork so that it is at the same voltage everywhere. Exact rules for electrical installations vary by country, locality, or supplying power company.

=== Equipotential Bonding in Buildings ===
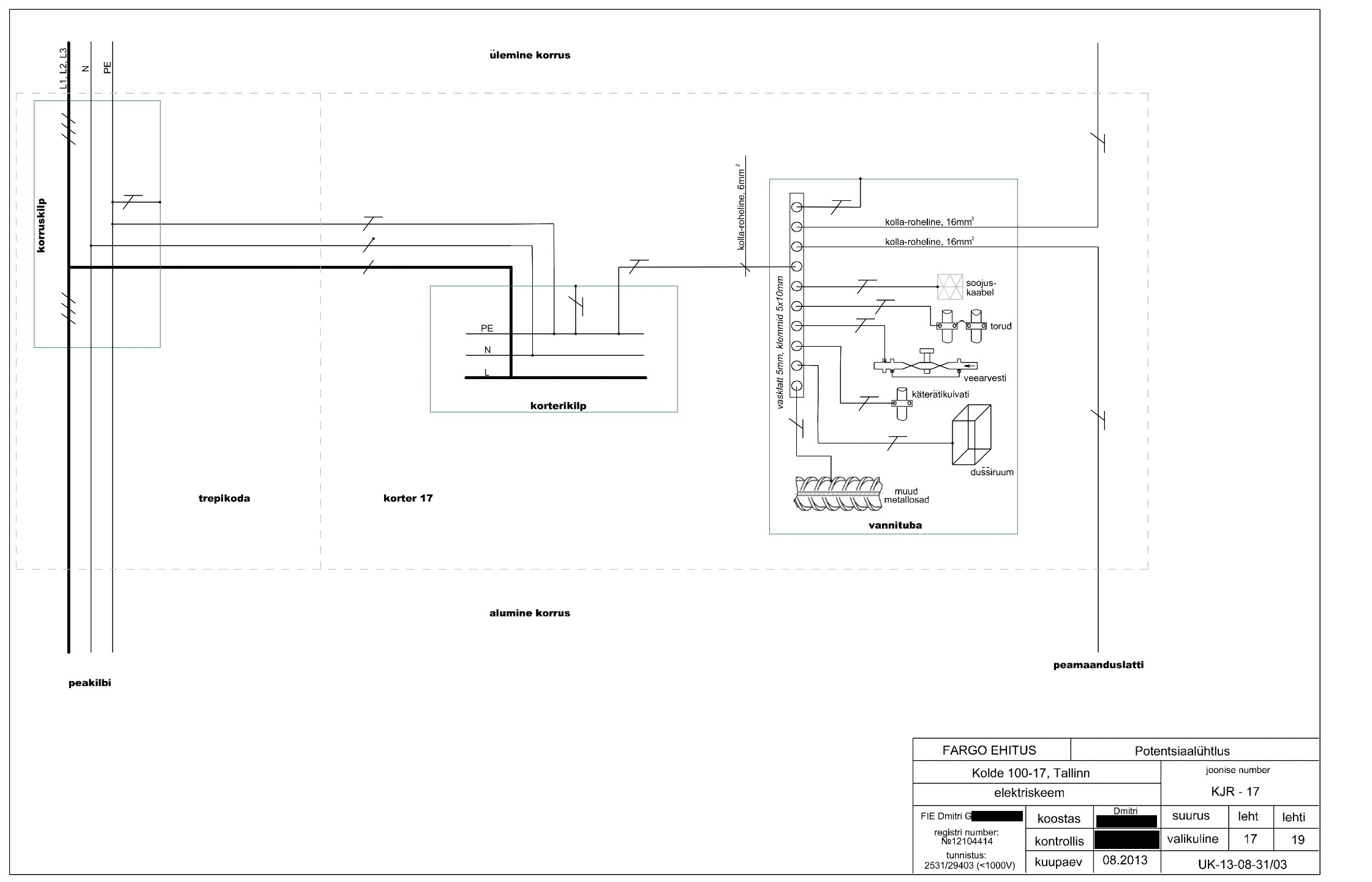
Example of an equipotential bonding bonding diagram that is used in a building to show components connected to a common grounding point.

Equipotential bonding is done from where the distribution wiring enters the building to incoming water and gas services. It is also done in bathrooms where all exposed metal that leaves the bathroom including metal pipes and the earths of electrical circuits must be bonded together to ensure that they are always at the same potential. Isolated metal objects, including metal fittings fed by plastic pipe, are not required to be bonded with the exception of construction utilizing metal stud work and framing seen in many taller condominium, apartment, and office/commercial construction.

=== Single Point Grounding ===
Multiple methods are used to perform protective grounding and bonding such as single point grounding and bracket grounding. Single point grounding consists of installing a grounding point that is central between the conductors, the system, and the ground creating an equipotential zone. It is often considered a preferred method in protective grounding and bonding due to the ease of installation.

=== Bracket Grounding ===
Bracket grounding consists of installing two different grounds that are in opposite locations of the work site. It tends to add more complexity in grounding and creating an equipotential zone. The complexity in bracket grounding increases the importance to properly install grounding points to ensure workers are kept safe in the work area.

=== Bonding vs Grounding ===
What makes bonding different than grounding is bonding works to conjoin separate metal parts into one in order to create a pathway that allows for fault current to flow to an established ground.

== Aircraft Electrical Bonding ==
In aircraft, electrical bonding prevents static electricity build-up that can interfere with radio and navigational equipment. Bonding also provides lightning protection by allowing the current to pass through the airframe with minimum arcing. Bonding prevents dangerous static discharges in aircraft fuel tanks and hoses.

== Standards and Regulations ==
Electrical bonding practices in the United States regarding workplace safety are held to standards under the Occupational Safety and Health Administration (OSHA). The OSHA standard 29 CFR 1926.404 requires that work sites have identifiable and also require the use of grounding conductors to ensure safety. The standard also requires under subsection 1926.404(b)(1)(ii) that all outlets that are used directly by employees and that are not fixed and permanent outlets for the building must have an approved ground fault circuit interrupter. More specifications regarding testing, validation, amperage amounts, and power conductor specifications are all found under the 1926.404 section. These standards and requirements are implemented to reduce risk to employees from electrical faults and shocks that can occur on a work site.

=== National Fire Protection Association and National Electrical Code ===
The National Fire Protection Association (NFPA) published standards under the National Electrical Code (NEC) that define what it means to properly ground and bond electrical systems. Under Part 5 of article 250 of the NEC, it specifies how to create a proper bonding are defined as the following, a low impedance path must be established to safely carry fault current to ground.

== See also ==
- Earthing system
- Earth potential rise
- Stray voltage
- Bonding jumper
