= Floating ground =

Electrical ground not connected to Earth

A floating ground is a reference point for electrical potential in a circuit which is galvanically isolated from actual earth ground.

Most electrical circuits have a ground which is electrically connected to the Earth, hence the name "ground". The ground is said to be floating when this connection does not exist.

Conductors are also described as having a floating voltage if they are not connected electrically to another non-floating (grounded) conductor. Without such a connection, voltages and current flows are induced by electromagnetic fields or charge accumulation within the conductor rather than being due to the usual external potential difference of a power source.

== Applications ==
Electrical equipment may be designed with a floating ground for one of several reasons. One is safety. For example, a low-voltage DC power supply, such as a mobile phone charger, is connected to the mains through a transformer of one type or another, and there is no direct electrical connection between the current return path on the low-voltage side and physical ground (earth). Ensuring that there is no electrical connection between mains voltage and the low-voltage plug makes it much easier to guarantee the safety of the supply. It also allows the charger to safely only connect to live and neutral, which allows a two-prong plug in countries where this is relevant. Indeed, any home appliance with a two-prong plug must have a floating ground.

Another application is in electronic test equipment. Suppose you wish to measure a 0.5 V potential difference between two wires that are both approximately 100 V above Earth ground. If your measuring device has to connect to Earth, some of its electronic components must deal with a 100 V potential difference across their terminals. If the whole device floats, then its electronics will only see the 0.5 V difference, allowing more delicate components to be used, which can make more precise measurements. Such devices are often battery powered.

Other applications include road vehicles, where a direct connection to Earth ground is impractical, and aircraft and spacecraft, where such a connection is physically impossible when in flight.

An example showing mains-powered electronic instruments with a floating ground. (Demonstrates three of the typical reasons for a floating ground.)

Fourthly, a floating ground can help eliminate ground loops, which reduces the noise coupled to the system. The image on the right shows an example of such a configuration. Systems isolated in this manner can and do drift in potential and if the transformer is capable of supplying much power, they can be dangerous. This is particularly likely if the floated system is near high voltage power lines. To reduce the danger of electric shocks, the chassis of the instruments are usually connected separately to Earth ground.

== Safety ==
Floating grounds can be dangerous if they are caused by failure to properly ground equipment that was designed to require grounding because the chassis can be at a very different potential from that of any nearby organisms, who then get an electric shock upon touching it. Live chassis TVs, also known as hot chassis, where the set's ground is derived by rectifying live mains, were common until the 1990s.

Exposed live grounds are dangerous. They are live, and can electrocute end users if touched. Headphone sockets fitted by end users to live chassis TVs are especially dangerous, as not only are they often live, but any electrical shock will pass through the user’s head. Sets with a headphone socket and a live chassis use an audio isolation transformer to make the arrangement safe.

Floating grounds can cause problems with audio equipment using RCA connectors (also called phono connectors). With these common connectors, the signal pin connects before the ground, and 2 pieces of equipment can have a greater difference between their grounds than it takes to saturate the audio input. As a result, plugging or unplugging while powered up can result in very loud noises in speakers. If the ground voltage difference is small, it tends to only cause hum and clicks.

A residual current device can be incorporated into a system to reduce but not eliminate the risks caused by a floating ground.

== See also ==
- Chassis ground
- Floating-gate MOSFET
- Cheater plug
