= Chassis ground =

Electrical ground between metallic parts of a machine

Symbol for chassis ground

A chassis ground is a link between different metallic parts of a machine to ensure an electrical connection between them. Examples include electronic instruments and motor vehicles.

== Usages ==
Electronics
Most electronic systems have their circuits reference-linked to the chassis while the chassis itself is often, but not always, linked to the Earth.
Motor vehicles
Most motor vehicles use the chassis as the reference for all electrical peripherals which allow the use of only one wire for each accessory.

== Confusion ==
The chassis must not be considered as a link to Earth. Depending on the usage of electrical machines, this may or may not be the case. For example, in all cars metallic parts are linked together but they are not linked to the Earth. This explains why one can experience electrical discharge when leaving a car.

== See also ==
- Floating ground
- Ground (electricity)
