= Disturbance voltage =

Unwanted voltage induced in a telecom system

In telecommunications, a disturbance voltage is an unwanted voltage induced in a system by natural or man-made sources.

In telecommunications systems, the disturbance voltage creates currents that limit or interfere with the interchange of information. An example of a disturbance voltage is a voltage that produces (a) false signals in a telephone, (b) Noise (radio) in a radio receiver, or (c) distortion in a received signal.
