= Ground and neutral =

In mains electricity, part of a circuit connected to ground or earth

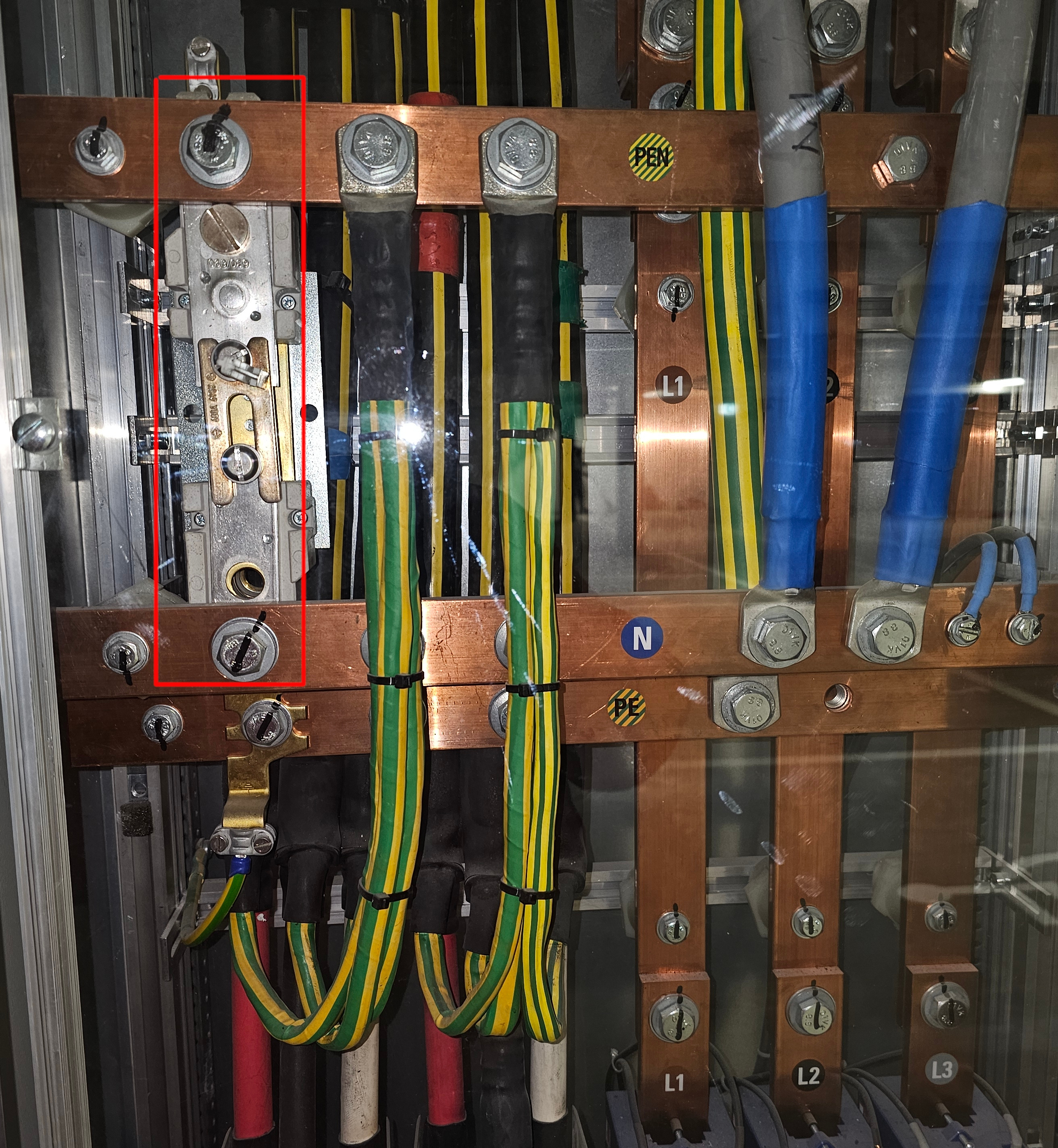
A shorting bar connecting ground and neutral in a Swiss industrial building (outlined in red). A piece of copper is visible that is designed to be easily connected or disconnected from its place between two screws for testing purposes, rated for 600 A (as stamped on it). Also visible are the thick wires in standard colors (two yellow/green ground and two blue neutral), as well as markings PEN (protected earth and neutral), PE (protective earth) and N (neutral). The three bars for the three phase lines (marked L1, L2 and L3) are also visible on the bottom right.

In electrical engineering, ground (or earth) and neutral are circuit conductors used in alternating current (AC) electrical systems. The neutral conductor carries alternating current (in tandem with one or more phase line conductors) during normal operation of the circuit. By contrast, a ground conductor is not intended to carry current for normal operation, but instead is present for safety: it connects exposed conductive parts (such as equipment enclosures or conduits enclosing wiring) to earth (the ground), and carries significant current only in the event of a circuit fault that would otherwise energize exposed conductive parts and present a shock hazard. In such case the intention is for the fault current to be large enough to trigger a circuit protective device that will either de-energize the circuit (via a fuse or circuit breaker) or provide a warning. To limit the effects of leakage current from higher-voltage systems, the neutral conductor is often connected to earth ground at the point of supply.

Significant voltage unintentionally appearing on exposed conductive parts of an electrical installation can present danger, so the installation of ground and neutral conductors is carefully regulated in electrical safety standards. Under certain strict conditions the same conductor may be used for providing both ground and neutral functions together.

== Grounding ==
A ground or earth conductor, or CPC (circuit protective conductor), in an AC power system is a conductor that provides a low-impedance path to the Earth to prevent hazardous voltages from appearing on equipment (high voltage spikes). The terms ground and earth are used synonymously in this section; ground is more common in North American English, and earth or the more technical term CPC is more common in British English. Under normal conditions, a ground conductor does not carry current. Ground conductors are essential for automatically cutting power in the event of ground faults.

International Electrotechnical Commission standard IEC 60364 codifies methods of installing neutral and ground conductors in a building. These earthing systems arrangements are designated with letter symbols.

In North American and European practice, suitably designed mains-powered portable equipment is permitted to have merely two conductors in their attachment plug (line and neutral), foregoing use of the available earth connection. Such appliances are known in the UK as Class-II or double-insulated.

== Neutral conductors ==
A neutral conductor, in combination with one or more phase line conductors, normally completes a circuit between the source and load. In a polyphase (usually three-phase) AC system however, the neutral conductor may carry very little current if the phases are balanced and in some cases may thus not be provided.

Neutral wires are typically "bonded" to Earth (ground) at either the electrical service entrance, or at transformers within the system. An exception to this is found in the IT earthing arrangement. For electrical installations with split-phase (three-wire single-phase) service, the neutral point of the system is at the center-tap on the secondary side of the service transformer. For larger electrical installations, such as those with polyphase service, the neutral point is usually at the common connection on the secondary side of delta/wye connected transformers. Other arrangements of polyphase transformers may result in no neutral point, and no neutral conductors.

== Combining neutral with ground ==
Stray voltages created in grounding (earthing) conductors by currents flowing in the supply utility neutral conductors can be troublesome. For example, special measures may be required in barns used for milking dairy cattle. Very small voltages, not usually perceptible to humans, may cause low milk yield, or even mastitis (inflammation of the udder). So-called "tingle voltage filters" may be required in the electrical distribution system for a milking parlour.

Connecting the neutral to the equipment case (if permitted by relevant regulations) provides some protection against faults, but may produce a dangerous voltage on the case if the neutral connection is broken.

Combined neutral and ground conductors are commonly used in electricity supply companies' wiring and occasionally for fixed wiring in buildings and for some specialist applications where there is little alternative, such as railways and trams. Since normal circuit currents in the neutral conductor can lead to objectionable or dangerous differences between local earth potential and the neutral, and to protect against neutral breakages, special precautions such as frequent rodding down to earth (multiple ground rod connections), use of cables where the combined neutral and earth completely surrounds the phase conductor(s), and thicker than normal equipotential bonding must be considered to ensure the system is safe.

=== Fixed appliances on three-wire circuits ===
In the United States, the cases of some kitchen stoves (ranges, ovens), cook tops, clothes dryers and other specifically listed appliances were grounded through their neutral wires as a measure to conserve copper from copper cables during World War II. This practice was removed from the NEC in the 1996 edition, but existing installations (called "old work") may still allow this to remain in place. Canada did not adopt this system.

Using the neutral conductor for grounding the equipment enclosure was considered safe since the devices were permanently wired to the supply and so the neutral was unlikely to be broken without also breaking both supply conductors.

== Shared neutral ==
A shared neutral is a connection in which a plurality of circuits use the same neutral connection. This is also known as a common neutral, and the circuits and neutral together are sometimes referred to as an Edison circuit.

=== Three-phase circuits ===
In a three-phase circuit, a neutral is shared between all three phases. Commonly the system neutral is connected to the star point on the feeding transformer. This is the reason that the secondary side of most three-phase distribution transformers is wye- or star-wound.

A system could be made entirely ungrounded. In this case a fault between one phase and ground would not cause any significant current. Commonly the neutral is grounded (earthed) through a bond between the neutral bar and the earth bar. It is common on larger systems to monitor any current flowing through the neutral-to-earth link and use this as the basis for neutral fault protection.

In a three-phase linear circuit with three identical resistive or reactive loads, the neutral carries no current. The neutral carries current if the loads on each phase are not identical. In some jurisdictions, the neutral is allowed to be reduced in size if no unbalanced current flow is expected. If the neutral is smaller than the phase conductors, it can be overloaded if a large unbalanced load occurs.

The current drawn by non-linear loads, such as fluorescent & HID lighting and electronic equipment containing switching power supplies, often contains harmonics. Triplen harmonic currents (odd multiples of the third harmonic) are additive, resulting in more current in the shared neutral conductor than in any of the phase conductors. In the absolute worst case, the current in the shared neutral conductor can be triple that in each phase conductor. Some jurisdictions prohibit the use of shared neutral conductors when feeding single-phase loads from a three-phase source; others require that the neutral conductor be substantially larger than the phase conductors. It is good practice to use four-pole circuit breakers (as opposed to the standard three-pole) where the fourth pole is the neutral phase, and is hence protected against overcurrent on the neutral conductor.

== Grounding problems ==
Common grounding problems and concerns can include the following:

- A ground connection that is missing or of inadequate capacity may not provide the protective functions as intended during a fault in the connected equipment.
- Extra connections between ground and circuit neutral may result in circulating current in the ground path, stray current introduced in the earth or in a structure, and stray voltage.
- A ground connection on a neutral conductor on the load side of an RCD may bypass its protection.
- Signal circuits that rely on a ground connection will not function or will have erratic function if the ground connection is missing.

== See also ==
- Appliance classes
- Electrical bonding
- Electrical wiring
- Electrical wiring in the United Kingdom
- Electrical wiring in North America
- Earthing system
- Ground (electricity)
