= Sunburst (finish) =

Finishing style for musical instruments

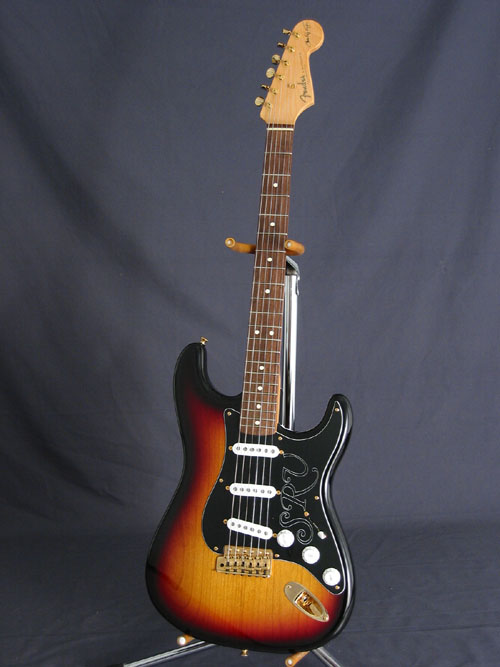
A Fender Stevie Ray Vaughan Signature Stratocaster electric guitar in a three-color sunburst finish.

Sunburst is a style of finishing for musical instruments such as electric and acoustic guitars and electric basses. At the center of a sunburst-finished surface is an area of lighter color (often showing the wood grain underneath) that darkens gradually towards the edges before hitting a dark rim. Among the best known examples of a sunburst finish are the Gibson Les Paul guitars and the Fender Stratocaster.

Some vintage mandolins made by Gibson had a burst style finish achieved with stain that was wiped on to the top of the instrument and sometimes the back as well, but sprayed tinted nitrocellulose lacquer later proved to be a faster way to achieve a burst finish.

There are various types of sunburst finishes. Some common types include "vintage sunburst", which is golden yellow in the very center and black around the edges, "cherry sunburst" or "cherryburst" - which is a golden yellow at the very center and cherry red towards the edges, "tobacco sunburst", which is golden yellow in the very center and brown around the edges, and "three-color sunburst," which fades from golden yellow at the center through a layer of red and finally to black around the edges. The finish is often transparent in order to show, and accentuate, attractively-patterned wood or wood veneers such as flame maple, but may be opaque where the wood is not strongly figured, such as basswood or alder.

Other sunburst varieties over the years included "Sienna Sunburst" and "Blue Burst", first introduced by Harmon in the late '70s and mid '80s. The American Series Strat HSS and the Strat Plus guitars are examples. The British Burns company use greenburst finishes on a number of their guitars, such as the Steer and Scorpion.

There are also aged variants of sunburst finishes which are usually found on high-end boutique instruments from Fender, Suhr, Tom Anderson, Melancon, Don Grosh and James Tyler, such as Aged Cherry Burst, Fireburst, Lightburst and Antique Tobacco Sunburst. These aged sunburst finishes are mostly suited for quilted, spalted and flamed maple tops, as well with other highly figured woods such as swamp ash and koa.
