= Instrument amplifier =

Amplifier with loudspeaker for use with musical instruments

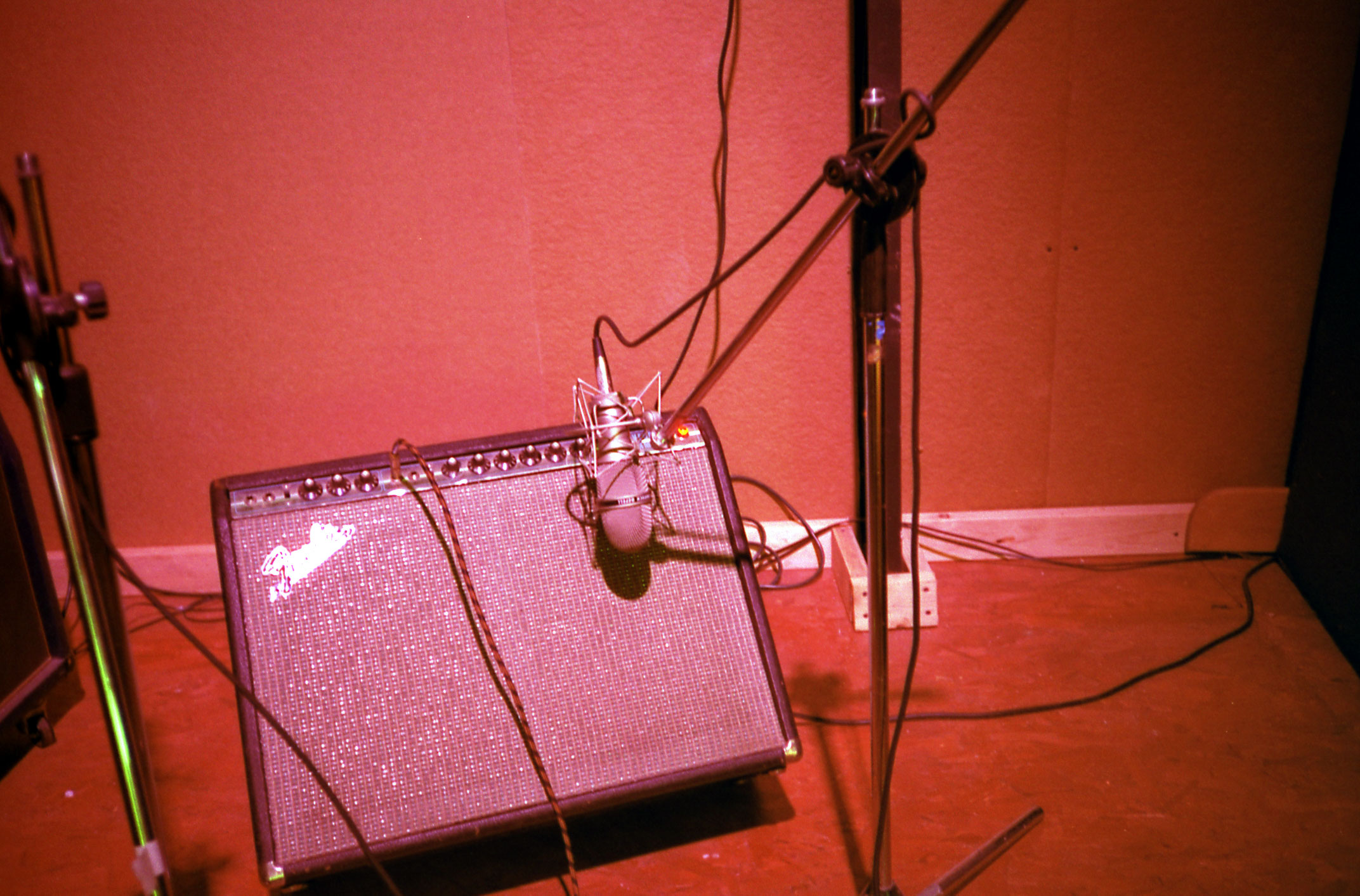
A Fender combo amplifier. The combination amplifier is a preamplifier, power amplifier and tone controls and one or more loudspeakers or drivers mounted in a portable wooden cabinet. This amp's sound is being picked up with a microphone in a recording studio.

An instrument amplifier is an electronic amplifier that converts the often barely audible or purely electronic signal of a musical instrument into a larger electronic signal to feed to a loudspeaker. An instrument amplifier is used with musical instruments such as an electric guitar, electric bass guitar, electric organ, electric piano, synthesizers and drum machine to convert the signal from the pickup (with guitars and other string instruments and some keyboards) or other sound source (e.g, a synthesizer's signal) into an electronic signal that has enough power, produced by a power amplifier, to drive one or more loudspeaker that can be heard by the performers and audience.

Combination (combo) amplifiers include a preamplifier, a power amplifier, tone controls, and one or more speakers in a cabinet, a housing or box usually made of wood. Instrument amplifiers for some instruments are also available without an internal speaker; these amplifiers, called heads, must plug into one or more separate speaker cabinets. Instrument amplifiers also have features that let the performer modify the signal's tone, such as changing the equalization (adjusting bass and treble tone) or adding electronic effects such as intentional distortion or overdrive, reverb or chorus effect.

Instrument amplifiers are available for specific instruments, including the electric guitar, electric bass guitar, electric and electronic keyboards, and acoustic instruments such as the mandolin and banjo. Some amplifiers are designed for specific styles of music, such as the Fender tweed guitar amplifiers, such as the Fender Bassman used by blues and country musicians, and the Marshall amplifiers used by hard rock and heavy metal bands.

Unlike home hi-fi amplifiers or public Address systems, which are designed to accurately reproduce the source sound signals with as little distortion as possible, instrument amplifiers are often designed to add additional tonal coloration to the original signal, and in many cases intentionally add some degree of distortion.

== Types ==
=== Guitar amplifiers ===
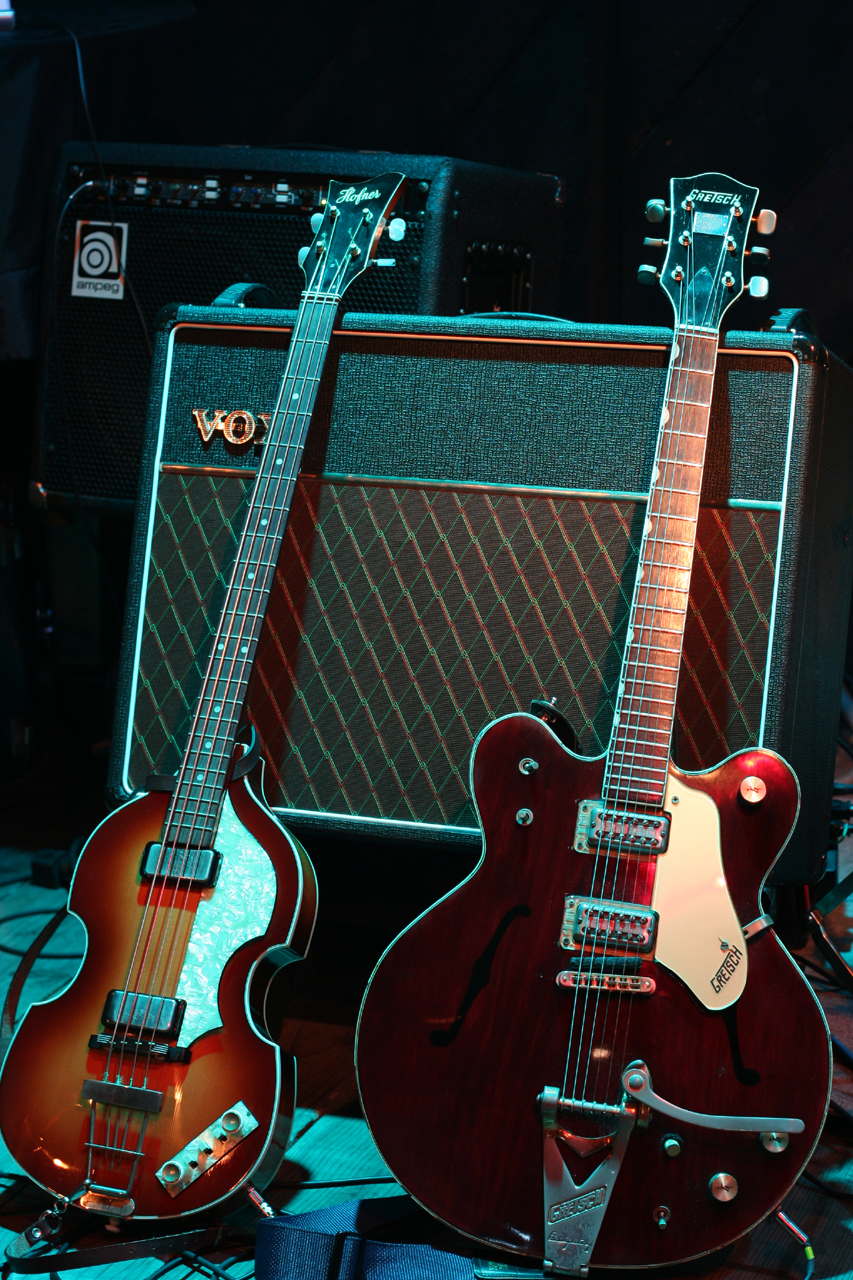
A Vox AC30 guitar amplifier used by The Beatles

A guitar amplifier amplifies the electrical signal of an electric guitar so that it can drive a loudspeaker at sufficient volume for the performer and audience to hear. Most guitar amplifiers can also modify the instrument's sound with controls that emphasize or de-emphasize certain frequencies and add electronic effects. String vibrations are sensed by a pickup. For electric guitars, strings are made of metal, and the pickup works by electromagnetic induction.

==== Standard amps ====
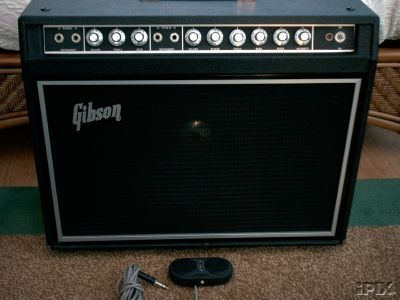
A small Gibson combo amplifier.

Standard amplifiers, such as the Fender tweed-style amps (e.g., the Fender Bassman) are often used by traditional rock, blues, and country musicians who wish to create a vintage 1950s-style sound. They are used by electric guitarists, pedal steel guitar players, and blues harmonica players. These amps are designed to produce a variety of sounds ranging from a clean, warm sound to a growling, natural overdrive. These amplifiers usually have a sharp treble roll-off at 5 kHz to reduce the extreme high frequencies, and a bass roll-off at 60–100 Hz to reduce unwanted boominess. The nickname tweed refers to the lacquered beige light-brown fabric covering used on these amplifiers.

Combo amplifiers such as the Fender Super Reverb have powerful tube amplifiers, 10- or 12-inch speakers, and they often have built-in reverb and vibrato effects units. These larger combo amplifiers are used for club performances and larger venues. For large concert venues such as stadiums, performers may also use an amplifier head with several separate speaker cabinets. Smaller, lighter guitar amps are also available, which have less powerful amplifier units and as few as one speaker. Smaller guitar amps are easier to transport to gigs and sound recording sessions. Smaller amps are widely used in small venue shows, because players can obtain the tone they want without having to have an excessively loud volume. The smallest combo amplifiers, which are mainly used for individual practice and warm-up purposes, may have only a single 8 or 10-inch speaker. Some players use these small combo amplifiers for concert performances, though, because it is easier to create natural overdrive with these lower-powered amplifiers.

==== Hard rock and heavy metal ====
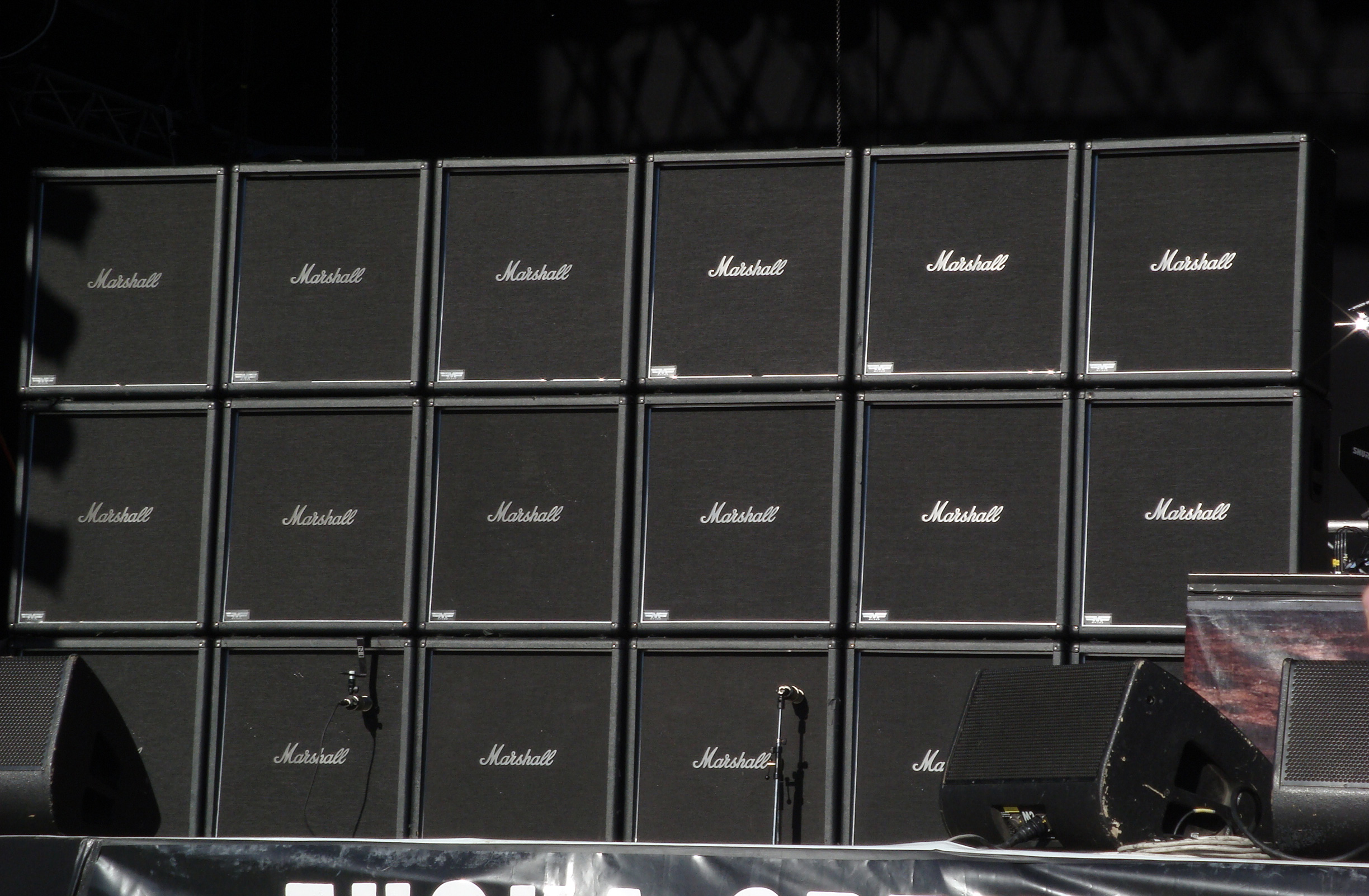
A 3×6 stack of mock Marshall guitar cabinets for Jeff Hanneman of Slayer

Powerful electric guitar amplifiers, such as Marshall amplifiers, are used in a range of louder, heavier genres of rock, including hard rock, heavy metal, and hardcore punk. These amplifiers can add an aggressive drive, intensity, and edge to the guitar sound with distortion effects, preamplification boost controls, and tone filters. This type of amplifier is available in a range of formats, ranging from small, self-contained combo amplifiers for rehearsal and warm-ups to heavy heads that are used with separate speaker cabinets—colloquially referred to as a stack. In contrast to the tweed-style amplifiers, which use speakers in an open-backed cabinet, companies such as Marshall tend to use 12" speakers in a closed-back cabinet. While many of the most expensive, high-end models use 1950s-style tube amplifiers, there are also many models that use transistor amplifiers, or a combination of the two technologies (e.g., a tube preamplifier with a transistor power amplifier).

In the late 1960s and early 1970s, public address systems at rock concerts were used mainly for the vocals. As a result, to get a loud electric guitar sound, early heavy metal, rock and electric blues bands often used stacks of 4 × 12" Marshall speaker cabinets on the stage. In 1969, Jimi Hendrix used four stacks to create a powerful lead sound, and in the early 1970s by the band Blue Öyster Cult used an entire wall of Marshall Amplifiers. In the 1980s, metal bands such as Slayer and Yngwie Malmsteen also used walls of over 20 Marshall cabinets. However, by the 1980s and 1990s, most of the sound at live concerts was produced by the sound reinforcement system rather than the onstage guitar amplifiers, so most of these cabinets were not connected to an amplifier. Instead, walls of speaker cabinets were used for aesthetic reasons.

Amplifiers for harder, heavier genres often use tube amplifiers. Tube amplifiers are perceived to have a warmer tone than transistor amps, particularly when overdriven to produce intentional distortion. These amplifiers usually allow users to switch between clean and distorted tones (or a rhythm guitar-style crunch tone and a sustained lead tone) with a foot-operated switch.

=== Bass ===
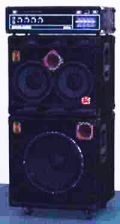
A 2 × 10-inch bass speaker cabinet stacked on top of a 15-inch cabinet, with separate bass amplifier head unit on top of both

Bass amplifiers are designed for bass guitars or more rarely, for upright bass. They differ from amplifiers for the electric guitar in several respects, with extended low-frequency response, and tone controls optimized for the needs of bass players. Amplifiers may include built-in bass effects units, such as audio compressor or limiter features, to avoid unwanted distortion at high volume levels and potential damage to speakers; equalizers; and bass overdrive.

Bass amps may provide an XLR DI output for routing the bass amp signal directly into a mixing board or PA system. Larger, more powerful bass amplifiers are often include internal or external metal heat sinks or fans to help keep the components cool.

Speaker cabinets designed for bass usually use larger loudspeakers than the cabinets used for other instruments, so that they can move the larger amounts of air needed to reproduce low frequencies. Bass players have to use more powerful amplifiers than the electric guitarists, because human hearing is less sensitive to bass frequencies. While the largest speakers commonly used for regular electric guitar have twelve-inch cones, electric bass speaker cabinets often use 15-inch speakers. Bass players who play styles of music that require an extended low-range response, such as death metal, sometimes use speaker cabinets with 18-inch speakers or add a large subwoofer cabinet to their rig.

Speakers for bass instrument amplification tend to be heavier-duty than those for regular electric guitar, and the speaker cabinets are typically more rigidly constructed and heavily braced, to prevent unwanted buzzes and rattles. Bass cabinets often include bass reflex ports, vents, or openings in the cabinet, which improve the bass response.

=== Keyboard ===
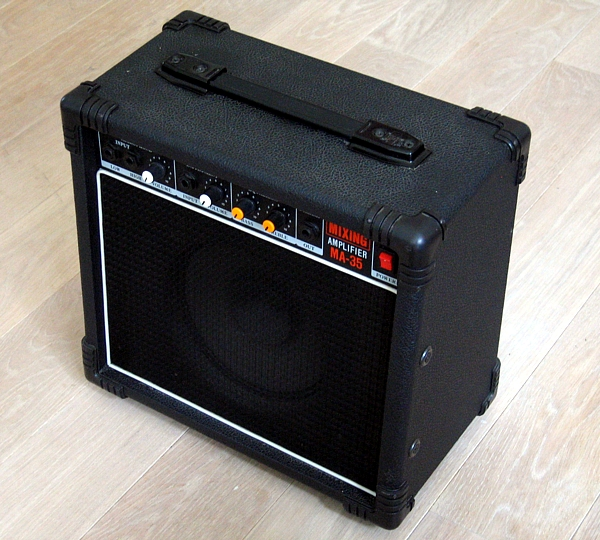
A small keyboard amplifier suitable for at-home practice capable of mixing the inputs from two keyboards.

A keyboard amplifier, used for stage piano, synthesizer, clonewheel organ and similar instruments, is distinct from other types of amplification systems due to the particular challenges associated with keyboards; namely, to provide solid low-frequency sound reproduction and crisp high-frequency sound reproduction. It is typically a combination amplifier that contains a two, three, or four-channel mixer, a pre-amplifier for each channel, equalization controls, a power amplifier, a speaker, and a horn, all in a single cabinet.

Other variations include keyboard amplifiers for specific keyboard types. The vintage Leslie speaker cabinet and modern recreations, which are generally used for Hammond organs, use a tube amplifier that is often turned up to add a warm, growling overdrive. Some electric pianos have built-in amplifiers and speakers, in addition to outputs for external amplification.

=== Acoustic amplifiers ===
These amplifiers are intended for acoustic instruments such as violin, mandolin, harp, and acoustic guitar—especially for the way musicians play these instruments in quieter genres such as folk and bluegrass. They are similar to keyboard amplifiers in that they have a relatively flat frequency response and avoid tonal coloration.

To produce this relatively clean sound, these amplifiers often have very powerful amplifiers, to provide additional headroom and prevent unwanted distortion. Some acoustic amplifier manufacturers use lightweight Class D switching amplifiers.

Acoustic amplifier designs strive to produce a clean, transparent, acoustic sound that does not—except for reverb and other effects—alter the natural instrument sound, other than to make it louder. Amplifiers often come with a simple mixer to blend signals from a pickup and microphone. Since the early 2000s, it is increasingly common for acoustic amplifiers to provide digital effects, such as reverb and compression. Some also contain feedback-suppressing devices, such as notch filters or parametric equalizers.

Acoustic guitars do not usually have a built-in pickup or microphone. Some acoustic guitars have a microphone mounted inside the body, which is designed to convert acoustic vibrations into an electrical signal, but may do so from direct contact with the guitar's body. Acoustic guitars may also use a piezoelectric pickup, which converts the vibrations of the instrument into an electronic signal. More rarely, a magnetic pickup may be mounted in the sound hole of an acoustic guitar; while magnetic pickups do not have the same acoustic tone that microphones and piezo pickups can produce, magnetic pickups are more resistant to acoustic feedback.

== Roles ==
Instrument amplifiers have a different purpose than amplifiers in radios and home stereo systems. Most home stereo amplifiers strive to accurately reproduce signals from pre-recorded music, with as little harmonic distortion as possible. In contrast, instrument amplifiers are designed to add additional tonal coloration to the original signal or emphasize certain frequencies. For electric instruments such as electric guitar, the amplifier helps to create the instrument's tone by boosting the input signal gain and distorting the signal, and by emphasizing frequencies deemed desirable and de-emphasizing frequencies deemed undesirable.

=== Size and power rating ===
In the 1960s and 1970s, large, heavy, high-output power amplifiers were preferred for instrument amplifiers, especially for large concerts, because public address systems were generally only used to amplify the vocals. Moreover, in the 1960s, PA systems typically did not include stage monitor systems to amplify the music for the onstage musicians. Instead, the musicians were expected to have instrument amplifiers that were powerful enough to provide amplification for the stage and audience. In rock concerts in the late 1960s and early 1970s, musicians often used large stacks of speaker cabinets powered by heavy tube amplifiers.

However, over subsequent decades, PA systems substantially improved, and used different approaches, such as horn-loaded bass bins (in the 1980s) and subwoofers (1990s onwards) to amplify bass frequencies. Also, in the 1980s and 1990s, stage monitor systems improved substantially, which helped sound engineers provide onstage musicians with a better reproduction of their instruments' sound.

As a result of improvements to PA and monitor systems, musicians no longer need huge, powerful amplifier systems. A small combo amplifier patched or miced into the PA suffices. Virtually all sound reaching the audience in large venues comes from the PA system. Onstage instrument amplifiers are more likely to be at a low volume, because high volume levels onstage make it harder for the sound engineer to control the sound mix.

In large venues, much of the onstage sound reaching the musicians now comes from the stage monitor system or in-ear monitors, not from the instrument amplifiers. While stacks of huge speaker cabinets and amplifiers are still used in concerts (especially in heavy metal), this is often mainly for aesthetics or to create a more authentic tone. The switch to smaller instrument amplifiers makes it easier for musicians to transport their equipment to performances. It also makes concert stage management easier at large clubs and festivals where several bands are performing in sequence, because with less backline equipment, the bands can be moved on and off the stage more quickly.

== Amplifier technology ==
Instrument amplifiers may be based on thermionic (tube or valve) or solid state (transistor) technology.

=== Tube amplifiers ===
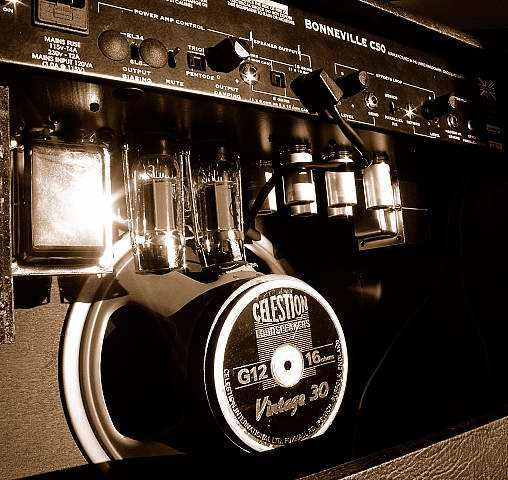
A Trace Elliot Bonneville tube amplifier as seen from the rear view: note the vacuum tubes extending into the wooden cabinet.

Vacuum tubes were the dominant active electronic components in amplifiers from the 1930s through the early 1970s, and tube amplifiers remain preferred by many musicians and producers. Some musicians feel that tube amplifiers produce a warmer or more natural sound than solid state units, and a more pleasing overdrive sound when overdriven. However, these subjective assessments of the attributes of tube amplifiers' sound qualities are the subject of ongoing debate. Tube amps are more fragile, weigh more, require more maintenance, and are usually more expensive than solid-state amps.

Tube amplifiers produce more heat than solid-state amplifiers, but few manufacturers of these units include cooling fans in the chassis. While tube amplifiers do need to attain a proper operating temperature, if the temperature goes above this operating temperature, it may shorten the tubes' lifespan and lead to tonal inconsistencies.

=== Solid-state amplifiers ===
By the 1960s and 1970s, semiconductor transistor-based amplifiers began to become more popular because they are less expensive, more durable, lighter-weight, and require less maintenance. There are an increasing range of products that use digital signal processing and digital modeling technology combined with a solid-state amplifier to simulate many different combinations of amplifiers, including the sound of tube amps, and speaker cabinets.

The output transistors of solid-state amplifiers can be passively cooled by using metal fins called heatsinks to radiate away the heat. For high-wattage amplifiers (over 800 watts), a fan is often used to move air across internal heatsinks.

=== Hybrid ===
In some cases, tube and solid-state technologies are used together in amplifiers. The most common hybrid amp design is to use a tube preamp with a solid-state power amplifier. This gives users the pleasing preamp and overdrive tone of a tube amp with the lowered cost, maintenance and weight of a solid-state power amp.

== See also ==
- Guitar speaker
- Isolation cabinet (guitar)
- Tube sound
- Power attenuator (guitar)
- Tone stack
