= THD Electronics =

American amplifier manufacturer

THD Electronics, Ltd.
- Type: Private
- Industry: Guitar amplifiers
- Founded: 1986
- Founder: Andrew Marshall
- Headquarters: Seattle, Washington, USA
- Area served: Global
- Products: UniValve, BiValve-30 and Flexi-50 amplifier heads, Hot Plate power attenuator
- Website: www.thdelectronics.com

THD Electronics, Ltd. is a manufacturer of amplifier accessories, and a former manufacturer of vacuum-tube guitar amplifiers. It is located in Seattle, Washington. It was founded in 1986 by President and CEO Andrew Marshall. At one time specializing in hand-built, vacuum tube “boutique”-style amplifiers, it continues to manufacture the “world’s best selling [guitar amplifier] power attenuator,” the THD Hot Plate. The company is well known in the boutique amplifier market, and is often credited with the creation of this market in the United States. THD's line of products stayed relatively small despite its 22-year history as a company. Of its amplifiers, THD made three: the UniValve, BiValve-30, and Flexi-50.

== Name origins ==
Copyright issues prevented Marshall from naming THD Electronics after himself, as Marshall Amplification had been established in the 1960s. Marshall also decided against naming the company after his first name because, in his words, “Who…is going to spend $2,500 on an ‘Andy Amp?’" Instead he chose THD, the acronym for “Total harmonic distortion”.

'(Total harmonic distortion) is one of the ways that amplifiers are rated,' says Marshall. 'And in the hi-fi world, where people are quite conscious of total harmonic distortion, everybody goes for the lowest possible amount of distortion. In the guitar amp world, people tend to go for the most. So it was slightly tongue-in-cheek, but more of an inside joke.'

Marshall has said that THD alternatively means “Two Hairy Dogs”, referring to his bearded collies, Truffles and Tobler and with the addition of a third dog, Piper, “Three Hairy Dogs”.

== Amplifier basics ==
=== Exterior ===
THD amplifier heads have a unique perforated steel cage, which is removable (via captive thumbscrews) if the amplifier is added to a rack or installed in a cabinet. Aside from the different faceplates, the UniValve, BiValve-30 and Flexi-50 look nearly identical. These amps are also available in a "box head" version. Although THD does not offer a hard-sided carrying case, they do make a soft-sided case for their amplifier heads.

=== Vacuum tubes ===
All THD amplifiers utilize vacuum tubes for their preamp and power amp sections. Until the release of the Flexi-50 amplifier, they were all class A (the Flexi-50 is class AB). This is why early THD UniValve prototypes were sometimes referred to as the “Pure Class A Head.”

=== Printed circuit boards ===
Unlike the vast majority of high-end, “boutique”-style guitar amplifiers, THD amplifiers are hand-built, but not hand-wired “point-to-point”. Instead, they utilize printed circuit boards (PCBs). There is some controversy in the guitar amplifier community about using PCBs as opposed to point-to-point wiring in tube amplifiers. THD escaped much of this criticism by using thick boards with large ground planes to reduce noise, as well as through-plating and use of Teflon wire for durability. THD also does not mount their electro-mechanical components like jacks, potentiometers, switches and tube sockets to the board.

An identifying feature of THD boards is the addition of famous quotes to the printing on the board. These circuit board quotes include:

- “‘A lie can travel halfway around the world while the truth is putting on its shoes.’ –Mark Twain”
- “‘Experience is the one thing you cannot get for nothing.’ –Oscar Wilde”
- “‘Don’t play what’s there. Play what’s not there.’ –Miles Davis”
- “‘Love is a perky elf dancing a merry little jig and then suddenly he turns on you with a miniature machine gun.’ –Matt Groening”
- “‘Wherever you go, There you are.’ –Buckaroo Banzai"

== First vintage reissue amplifier ==
In 1987, THD Electronics put the first vintage reissue vacuum tube guitar amplifier into production, the 4-10 amp. It was modeled after a 1959 5F6-A "tweed" (a misnomer: the cloth is actually twill) Fender Bassman and, unlike the Peavey Classic Amplifiers of the 1970s (which were covered in twill-patterned vinyl) the 4-10 was covered in authentic cotton twill, the first since Fender and Gibson stopped production of twill-covered amplifiers in 1960. The 4-10 was in production from 1987-1993. In 1989 a head-only and 2-10 version were released as well.

== THD Plexi amplifier ==
The next amplifier in production was the Plexi, manufactured from 1990-1993. Although it, too, was physically styled after the Fender Bassman (and was also available in tweed), electronically and sonically, it was meant to mimic an early JMP Marshall. In 1992, Guitar Player Magazine conducted a one-to-one test with a 1973 JMP Marshall 50-watt amplifier head, and found the two sounded “very close”. From 1990-1991, a very limited run of THD 50-watt bass amplifiers was also produced. These bass amplifiers were dubbed the “Classic Bass Head”. For the last 18 months of the Plexi's production, several minor circuit changes were made, prompting THD to rename it the “Type-O”.

== 2x12” extension cabinet ==
In 1990, THD also started production on a 2x12" extension cabinet for guitar amplifiers (the “2” refers to the cabinet having two speakers, the “12” refers to the size of the speakers, in this case 12 inches.) The back of the speaker cabinet is “ported,” (also known as “vented”) which tunes the cabinet to give it substantially more bass-response than either an open-back or sealed cabinet can. The two-inch “slot-port” in the back of the cabinet, “is designed to offer the air and breath you get from an open-back design,” while giving more bottom end and overall efficiency than can be had from a sealed cabinet. Fifteen years after it started production, THD 2x12" extension cabinet won Guitar Player Magazine's Reader's Choice Award for best speaker cabinet. Although usually covered in black vinyl, cream, brown and blue paisley-colored 2x12" extension cabinets were manufactured as well.

== Hot Plate power attenuator ==
The Hot Plate power attenuator was first released by THD in 1994. It was designed to act as a type of master volume control for tube-based amplifiers, without sacrificing the distorted sounds such amplifiers make when they are played at full volume. The concept started in the late 1980s as a way to in-house test the company's amplifiers without the technicians’ suffering hearing loss.

The Hot Plate works by being installed between the amplifier and the speaker cabinet (if any is used), absorbing the majority of the signal from the amplifier and passing only a small amount to the speaker. The remaining power is converted to heat. The UniValve and BiValve-30 amplifiers have Hot Plates built into them; the Flexi-50 has a foot-switchable master volume control in lieu of a Hot Plate. The Hot Plate is manufactured in five different colors; each color corresponds to the specific amplifier impedance that the Hot Plate is optimized for (the impedances should be matched.) The colors and impedances are: gold- 2 ohms, green- 2.7 ohms, red- 4 ohms, purple- 8 ohms, and blue- 16 ohms.

The Hot Plate has a line-out jack, which can be used to send a DI signal to the mixer, or to insert equalization, time effects, and possibly a solid-state amplifier between the distorting tube power amp and the guitar speaker. The Line Out (or DI) signal can be blended with a miked guitar speaker at the mixing console. The Load setting enables using the Hot Plate as a pure dummy load, with no guitar speaker.

== Yellow Jacket tube converters ==
The Yellow Jacket was also released in 1994. Yellow Jackets are a type of adapter that allows the existing power tubes in a guitar amplifier to be replaced with EL84 power tubes without rebiasing the amplifier. In 1994, Guitar World Magazine conducted a test in which Yellow Jackets were installed in a 100-watt Marshall Plexi Reissue. The resulting tones were “similar to those of a Vox AC30” although the amplifier was not as loud as it had been before the modification. There are several sets of Yellow Jacket tube converters, their designations relate to the type of amplifier they are converting.

== UniValve amplifier ==
The UniValve is a 15-watt amplifier head released in 2001. Although it operates with only one output tube, it was designed to take a wide range of output tubes without needing to be rebiased. The UniValve was the first-ever recipient of Guitarist Magazine’s “Guitarist Gold” award, under their revised scoring standards. The etched design on the amplifier's front panel was made to resemble the work of artists and architects Charles Rennie Mackintosh and Frank Lloyd Wright. As of 2004, only around 1,300 UniValves had been produced. Their serial numbers start with 000, although model number 000 was given to the THD dealer who coined the amplifier's name. Billy Gibbons (of the band ZZ Top) requested serial number 007, and model 666 (which is written on the back of the UniValve chassis in red ink) is owned by a former THD employee.

== BiValve-30 amplifier ==
As the name would suggest, the BiValve-30 amplifier head is a 30-watt amplifier with two output valves. It was released by THD in 2002. Like the UniValve, the BiValve-30's cathode-biasing allows it to adjust to individual tubes automatically. It is one of only a very few parallel-single-ended tube guitar amplifiers ever produced, and is the only one whose output transformer has separate primary windings for each power tube, accomplishing the unique feat of magnetically merging the outputs of the two power tubes—even if they are of dissimilar types—instead of simply connecting the plates of the two power tubes to a single primary winding to sum their outputs—which requires that the two tubes be of the same type. It, too, has a chemically-etched stainless steel faceplate, although THD chose a marine theme for the BiValve-30. Also, the BiValve-30 uses screen printing on the faceplate in addition to etching. In 2002, the BiValve-30 received a “Guitarist Choice” award from Guitarist Magazine, after being rated a 4.5 out of 5 possible stars. In that test, the BiValve-30 was given a slightly lower score in the “value for money” category, and the accompanying written review stated: “…definitely an amp for the well-heeled purist”.

== Flexi-50 amplifier ==
The Flexi-50 amplifier head was released in 2003, and made its debut at that year's Music Live event in the UK. It is a 50-watt, class-AB amplifier, meant to “create an idealized (Marshall) ‘Plexi’ tone". As a “subtle homage” to the Plexi, the Flexi's faceplate is gold Plexiglas. Like its predecessors, the Flexi-50 was designed to take the same range of vacuum tubes that the UniValve and BiValve-30 can. However, the Flexi is not self-biasing. Instead, it has three bias test-points on the rear panel for manually biasing the amplifier when the tubes are changed. It received a Guitarist Choice Award from Guitarist Magazine in April 2004, and a Guitar Player Magazine's Editor's Pick Award in December of that year as well.

== Notable customers ==
THD has traditionally shied away from formal endorsers. However, the company does have many professional customers. Some clients include Jeff Beck (The Yardbirds), Peter Buck (R.E.M.), Eric Clapton, Charlie Daniels, Bob Dylan, John Fogerty (Creedence Clearwater Revival), Billy Gibbons (ZZ Top), Paul Gilbert (Mr. Big), Kirk Hammett (Metallica), Mick Jagger (The Rolling Stones), Mark Knopfler (Dire Straits), Mick Mars (Mötley Crüe), Steve Miller, Bob Mould (Hüsker Dü, Sugar), Jimmy Page (Led Zeppelin), Prince, Chris Poland (Megadeth, OHM), Brian Setzer (Stray Cats, Brian Setzer Orchestra), Dan Spitz (Anthrax), George Thorogood, Eddie Van Halen (Van Halen), and Stevie Ray Vaughan

The official THD website includes a much more comprehensive "THD Artist List".
