= Jim Kelley Amplifiers =

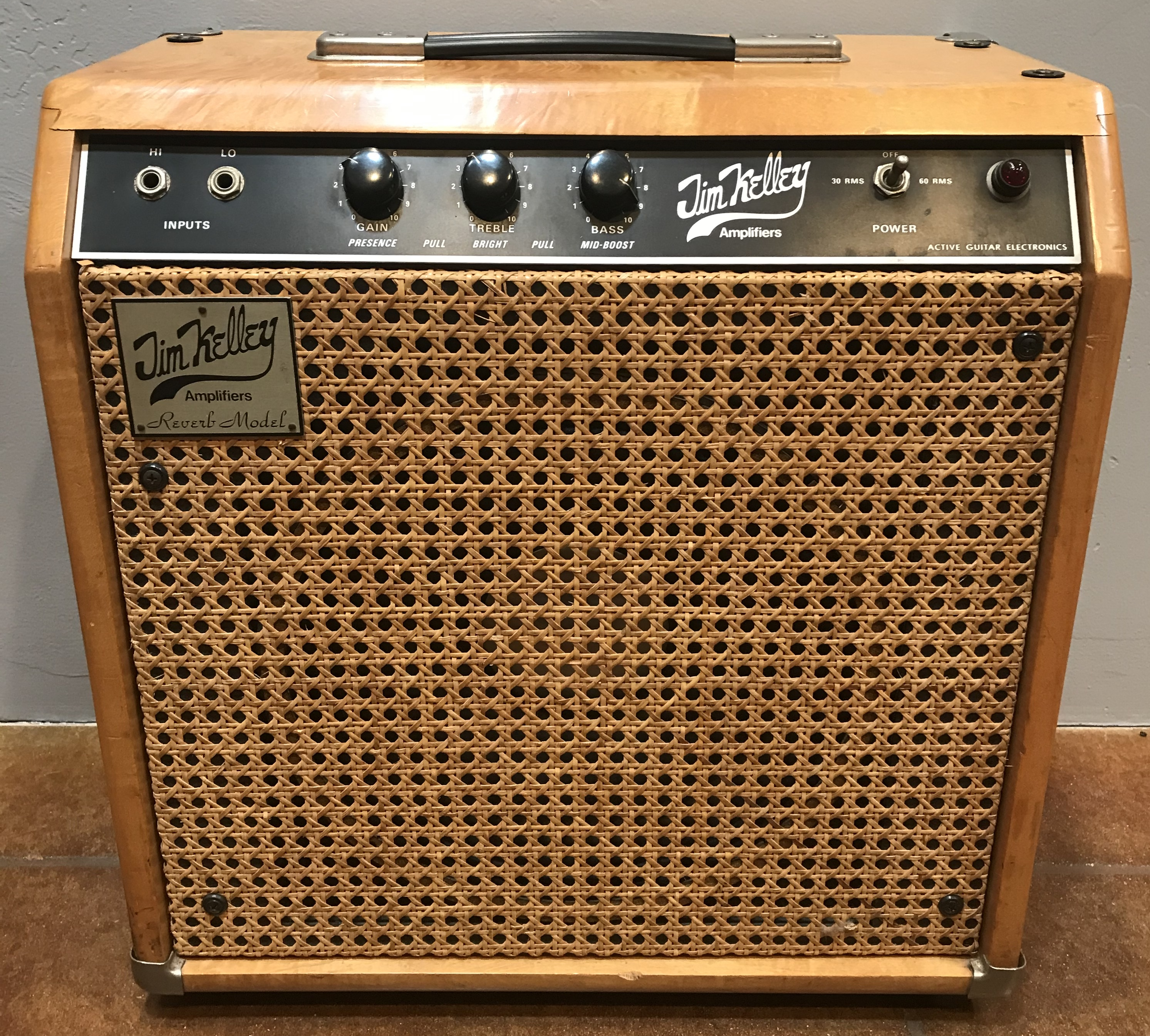
1984 Reverb Model in flame maple

Jim Kelley Amplifiers is the trademark for the vacuum tube guitar amplifiers designed by Jim Kelley and manufactured by his company Active Guitar Electronics of Tustin, California between the years of 1978 and 1985. Approximately 600 of these amps were built during that time. The single-channel version of the amplifier employed modest gain in the preamp stages, Baxandall type bass and treble controls, a split load phase inverter, and four 6V6GT output tubes. The amplifiers produce 60 watts RMS at full power, and include a half power (30/60) switch.

An improved version of the single-channel amp was released in 1980 which included reverb, an additional stage of gain, and optional foot switchable gain boost. These guitar amps were the first to employ a matched quartet of Sylvania 6V6GT output tubes. The amps were offered with hardwood cabinets, or in a variety of vinyl-covered birch plywood cabinets in a variety of colors. The amps were built as 1-12", or 1-10" combos, or as a head. JBL E-120 speakers were offered as an option.

Jim Kelley Amplifiers were also the first guitar amplifiers to be offered with an optional power attenuator. Jim developed these high-power continuously variable L-pad attenuators as a means of controlling the overall volume of his amplifiers so that the output section could be overdriven at more modest sound pressure levels. One unique feature of these power attenuators is the remote footswitch which would allow the attenuator to be bypassed.

Further amplifier innovations were incorporated into the FACS (foot-activated channel switching) model, which built upon the single-channel design by including two similar switchable preamps and tone stacks, independent reverb level controls for each channel, and internal relay switching for the external power attenuator. These models were available with optional transformer-coupled effects loops, and were configured for either a master effects loop, or for a separate effects loop for each channel. Owing to its longer (22-inch) chassis, the FACS model amplifiers were available additionally as a 2-10", or 4-10" combo. Another novel feature developed by Jim Kelley was the LED Bias Indicator as an aid in adjusting grid bias.

The final model to be developed and produced was the FACS Line Amp. It had all the features of a FACS amp, but the lead channel also employed a low-power push-pull output section. The miniature output transformer was followed by the Main Gain control, which functioned as a Master Volume. The lead channel also had a post distortion passive LC tone control which could cut or boost mid-range.

A rack-mounted, all-FET stereo guitar amplifier with analog delay reverb was developed but never brought to market.

From 2012 until 2017 Suhr Guitars (JS Technologies) reissued the single-channel Reverb Model and Power Attenuator under a licensing agreement with Jim Kelley.

In 2018 Jim began building a new single channel version of the Line Amp model in limited quantities from his own shop. The amps are now only sold at privately held online auctions. The most distinguishing feature of the new design is the innovative Harmonics Generator overdrive circuit. The circuit comprises a dual cascode differential amplifier and utilizes a pair of conventional dual triode tubes. The circuit produces harmonic distortion similar to that of an overdriven power output stage. Like the earlier Line Amps, output signal level is controlled by the Main Gain master volume. A post master volume, transformer coupled, guitar level effects loop is also provided. In addition, the amp contains much of the same circuitry as the original Single Channel non-reverb amp.

In 2020 Jim Kelley began building a two channel version of the Line Amp. Unlike the FACS Line Amp, these amps feature two distinct inputs. But similar to the FACS, the two channel Line Amp has two preamps, and each preamp has its own tone controls. The A input is a legacy Reverb Model preamp. The B input is the Line Amp channel. Channel switching is accomplished using any external A/B or A/B/Y type footswitch. Among the unique feature of these amps are the dual concentric potentiometers, providing control of Gain, Treble, and Bass for each of the two channels.
