= James Tyler Guitars =

American guitar manufacturer

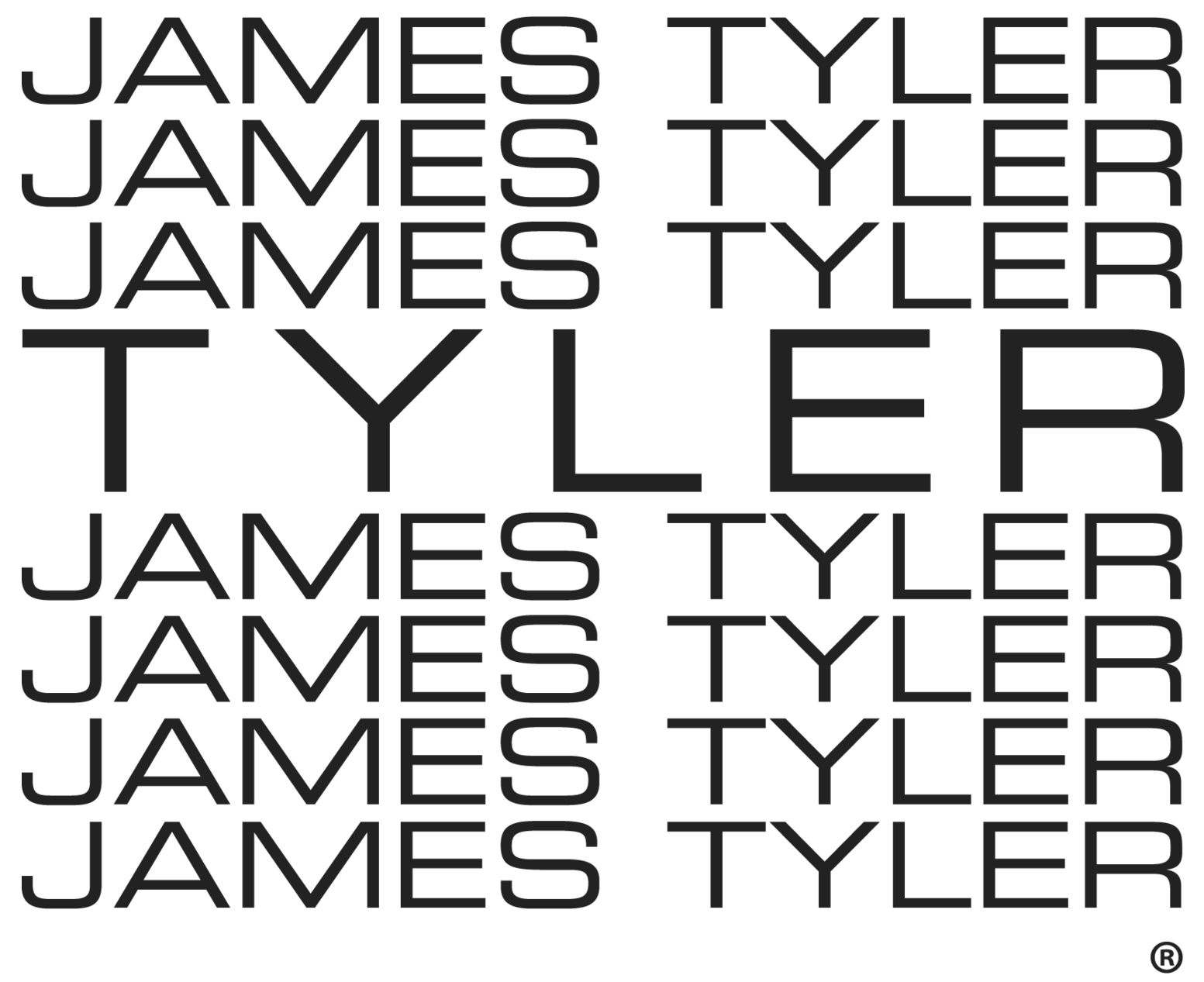
- Type: Private
- Industry: Musical instruments
- Founded: 1972; 54 years ago
- Headquarters: San Fernando, California, United States
- Products: Electric guitars
- Website: tylerguitars.com

James Tyler Guitars is a manufacturer of electric guitars. The company was located near Van Nuys, California and established in 1972. Consequently reaching the public eye through studio musicians like Dann Huff, Michael Landau, and Neil Stubenhaus. The company is known for creating custom high end guitars, with an unusual headstock, and guitar body finishes with names like "psychedelic vomit", "burning water", and "caramel cappuccino shmear".

== History ==
During the 1980s the company did primarily repairs and modifications on guitars, but built some custom guitars based on parts from other manufacturers such as Kramer for the Los Angeles studio musicians Dean Parks, Michael Landau and Dann Huff. In 1987 the first production model was released called the "Studio Elite", a hot-rodded Fender Stratocaster The woodwork was done by hand and it featured a "hockey paddle" headstock, which was used to ensure that the company does not infringe on Fender Musical Instruments Corporation's trademark headstock design. The Studio Elite model is featured on Guitarist magazine's list of "50 guitars to play before you die".

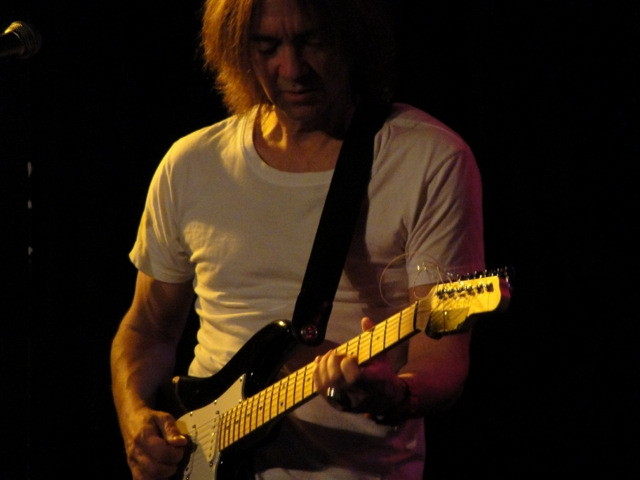
Wayne Krantz plays his James Tyler Studio Elite in Chicago, 2012

Their second model, the "Ultimate Weapon" (available with two or three humbuckers and a Floyd Rose locking tremolo), was introduced in 1993 and was also based on the Fender Stratocaster but with a redesigned appearance. The latest incarnation of the guitar, the "Ultimate Weapon HD", introduced in 2007, came with a pickguard, an H/S/S pickup layout and a Wilkinson vibrato. Tyler describes this model as "a Studio Elite wearing an Ultimate Weapon suit." In 2006 they introduced two models named Mongoose and Mongoose Retro, the former leaning towards Gibson-style design, while the latter is more of a Fender-design, both being "a sort of Les Paul-meets-Telecaster" and taking over for the Telecaster-styled Tylerbastar line. By now the manufacturing process had also started to utilize a Fadal digital CNC machine for routing the guitar bodies, allowing for additional optional features like a hollow body. The company now also winds their own pickups, while earlier they used standard and custom pickups from manufacturers like Seymour Duncan, DiMarzio, Lindy Fralin, Tom Anderson and John Suhr.

The company's first original finish was created in 1991 for Michael Landau as a joke that Tyler has commented "unfortunately, the world took it seriously". It got named "psychedelic vomit", and Jordan McLachlan of Guitarist magazine described it as "completely mad and random". The second finish was created in 1993, again for Michael Landau, and was named "burning water", and is a combination of different colors which Neville Marten described as "a mass of swirls in different metallic colors". In 1998 the first "shmear" finish was created, a paint job that uses layers of different kinds of paint and takes about a week to finish.

In 2008 the company released a series of guitars using the brand "Joe" and only made them available to the Japanese market. These guitars are a more minimal version of the Studio Elite and the Strat-style Classic models.

A Tyler-designed series of Line 6's Variax line of guitars was announced in the spring of 2010.

The company also produced a limited number of custom-built bass guitars between 1992 and 2006, used for instance by David Hungate and Neil Stubenhaus.

In 2011 Tyler Guitars relocated their operation and offices to a new facility in San Fernando Valley. In 2014 James Tyler partnered with Japanese distributor Daisuke Kitahara to manufacture affordable versions of their popular models in Japan before establishing Tyler Guitars Japan two years later.

James Tyler died from interstitial lung disease on August 29, 2024, at the age of 72.

James Tyler Guitars will continue to manufacture guitars and develop new models.

== Models ==
- Studio Elite
- Ultimate Weapon
- Mongoose
- Tylerbastar
- Classic

== Artists ==
Some musicians who use/have used Tyler guitars are:

- Abraham Laboriel
- Dann Huff
- David Williams
- David Hungate
- Dean Parks
- Ed DeGenaro
- Elvis Costello
- Glenn Pearce
- George Lynch
- Jake E. Lee
- Jennifer Batten
- John Fogerty
- Keith Howland
- Kenny Loggins
- Matt Scannell
- Michael Anthony
- Michael Casswell
- Michael Landau
- Neil Stubenhaus
- Prince
- Rick Derringer
- Robben Ford
- Steve Howe
- Steve Lukather
- Steve Watson
- Stuart Hamm
- Takeshi Akimoto
- Terry L Perry
- Gerry McGee
- Tommy Walker (worship leader)
- Vivian Campbell
- Walter Becker
- Wayne Krantz
- Yuji Toriyama
- Jae Park
