= Variax =

Line 6 line of guitars

Variax was the name of a line of guitars developed and marketed by Line 6 between 2002 and 2023. They differed from typical electric and acoustic guitars in that internal electronics processed the sound from individual strings to model (replicate) the sound of specific guitars and other instruments. The maker claims it was the first guitar family able to emulate the tones of other notable electric and acoustic guitars. It also provided a banjo and a sitar tone. The Variax was available primarily in electric guitar models, but acoustic and electric bass guitar models have also been available in the past.

== James Tyler Variax electric guitars ==
JTV59
- Manufacturer: Line 6
- Period: 2010 - 2023

Construction
- Body type: Solid
- Neck joint: Set
- Scale: 24-9/16"

Woods
- Body: Mahogany with carved maple top and flame maple veneer
- Neck: Mahogany
- Fretboard: Rosewood

Hardware
- Bridge: Stoptail (fixed)
- Pickup: James Tyler Alnico Humbuckers

Colors available
- Black, Cherry Sunburst, Tobacco Sunburst

JTV-69
- Manufacturer: Line 6
- Period: 2010-2023

Construction
- Body type: Solid
- Neck joint: Bolt on
- Scale: 25.5"

Woods
- Body: Alder
- Neck: Maple
- Fretboard: Rosewood, Ebony

Hardware
- Bridge: 2-Point Tyler Designed Floating Tremolo
- Pickup: SSH Tyler Designed Alnico

Colors available
- Lake Placid Blue, Candy Apple Red, Black

In 2010, Line 6 released three new models of Variax electric guitars (replacing the old models), with updated technology and bodies designed by luthier James Tyler.

- JTV59 was inspired by the archetypal single-cutaways and features time-tested tonewoods, Tyler-designed PAF-style alnico humbuckers and stoptail bridge.
- JTV69 was a classic three-pickup solid-body with alder body, vintage-style Tyler neck and custom tremolo bridge.
- JTV89 had a 3-piece maple neck with reverse headstock, 24-fret rosewood fingerboard and Tyler's Fast 'n' Flat neck profile.
- JTV89F was the same guitar with the addition of a licensed Floyd Rose locking tremolo.

Each model came in a US-made or Korean-made version. The Tyler Variax guitars all came with standard pickups as well as the electronic modeling capabilities, whereas the earlier Variaxes had no magnetic pickups. New models included the Yamaha-designed "Standard" and the Stevic Mckay (Twelve Foot Ninja) signature model "Shuriken"

The Shuriken was available in two models. Both models were released in early 2017:

- The SR270 model, with an alder body and maple neck with Indian ebony fretboard, and a 27 inch scale length
- The SR250 model, which is identical to the SR270 model but with a 25 inch scale length

All models of electric Variax (JTV, Shuriken, and Standard) were discontinued in 2023

=== Electronic Models ===
Models in all Variaxes were based on the following guitars:

- 1960 Fender Telecaster Custom
- 1968 Fender Telecaster
- 1968 Fender Telecaster Thinline
- 1959 Fender Stratocaster
- 1958 Gibson Les Paul Standard
- 1952 Gibson Les Paul "Goldtop"
- 1961 Gibson Les Paul Custom (3 PU)
- 1956 Gibson Les Paul Junior
- 1976 Gibson Firebird V
- 1955 Gibson Les Paul Special
- 1959 Gretsch 6120
- 1956 Gretsch Silver Jet
- 1968 Rickenbacker 360
- 1966 Rickenbacker 360-12
- 1961 Gibson ES-335
- 1967 Epiphone Casino
- 1957 Gibson ES-175
- 1953 Gibson Super 400
- 1959 Martin D-28
- 1970 Martin D 12-28
- 1967 Martin O-18
- 1966 Guild F212
- 1995 Gibson J-200
- 1935 Dobro Alumilite
- Danelectro 3021
- Coral/Dano Electric Sitar
- Gibson Mastertone Banjo
- 1928 National Style 2 "Tricone"

== Variax electric guitars ==
Variax Electric Guitar (300/500/600/700)
- Manufacturer: Line 6
- Period: 2002 — 2010

Construction
- Body type: Solid
- Neck joint: Bolt-on neck

Woods
- Body: Agathis (300), Basswood (600), Mahogany and Ash (700)
- Neck: Maple
- Fretboard: Rosewood (300, 500 & 700), Maple (600), all with 22 frets

Hardware
- Bridge: Fixed (300, 500, 700), Tremolo (600, 700)
- Pickup: Bridge saddle-mounted piezo

The earlier solid body Variax electric guitars made by Line 6 were available in four models:

- The original 500 did not have a model number when it came out in 2002, but the manufacturer relabeled it the 500 when they introduced the 700 in 2004. They discontinued the 500 about a year later. It was manufactured in Korea.
- The "budget" model 300 came out in 2005, was in limited supply by 2007 and was finally discontinued in early 2009. It was manufactured in Indonesia.
- The 600 featured a vibrato bridge and all-maple neck with six-on-a-side tuners. It was manufactured initially in Korea, then China.
- The upmarket 700 had a carved top, either a hardtail or vibrato bridge, maple neck, and rosewood fingerboard. It had three-on-a-side tuners and diamond shaped mother of pearl inlays with an abalone "V" at the 12th fret. It was manufactured in Japan.

The bridge of a Variax electric guitar has an individual piezoelectric pickup for each string. The instrument's electronics converts each of these six signals to a digital signal, and digitally processes each to emulate the selected sound. Since the system processes the strings separately, it can model the effects that one string of a target emulation might cause on another. It can also shift individual string pitches to digitally create alternate tunings instead of pitch-shifting all strings at once.

Some enthusiasts have transplanted Variax electronics and hardware into different instruments. These "transplants" can look like almost any popular guitar, yet produce all the Variax emulations.

== Variax acoustic guitars ==
Line 6 marketed four models of Variax acoustic modeling guitars: the 300 Nylon String and 300 Steel String, which allow varying virtualbody size and mic placement—and the more expensive steel stringed, cedar (later spruce)-topped 700, which pitch-shifts individual strings to provide alternate tunings. The 700 emulates over a dozen rare and desirable acoustic instruments, including an acoustic Indian sitar, rather than the Coral electric sitar modeled in the electric Variaxes. Line 6 produced a rare and final model dubbed the 900, of which only 50 were produced and distributed by Line 6. The 900s were made in Japan rather than Korea as the 700s were. The 900s had a solid body with a semi hollow acoustic style facade sound hole, maple neck, and rosewood fingerboard was adorned with diamond shaped mother of pearl inlay instead of the cross design the 700s had, it also had an abalone inlay "V" at the 12th fret. The most publicly recognized Variax Acoustic 900 was used by recording artist James Taylor, while singing the American National Anthem at the opening ceremony of the NBA Finals of 2008, as well as an event hosted at Borders Bookstore. Line 6 discontinued the acoustic models in 2010.

James Hetfield was a long time user of customised Variax acoustic models

== Variax bass guitars ==
Line 6 offered the same technology for electric bass guitars with the 4-string Variax 700 bass and the model 705 5-string bass, but discontinued them in 2007.

== Workbench Software ==
Variax guitars have a Variax Digital Interface (VDI) port that connects them via an Ethernet cable to compatible hardware like the Line 6 POD amp modelers, or through the Workbench interface via USB to a computer. Note that the (300-700) guitar cannot be connected directly to the computer but requires a Line 6 USB interface or POD Live / Vetta. Workbench is also the name of the software that lets users customize the electronic models—change body type, change and move pickups, and adjust volume and tone knobs function. Users can create customized models and tunings and then save them back to the guitar.
