= Distortion (music) =

Type of electronic audio manipulation

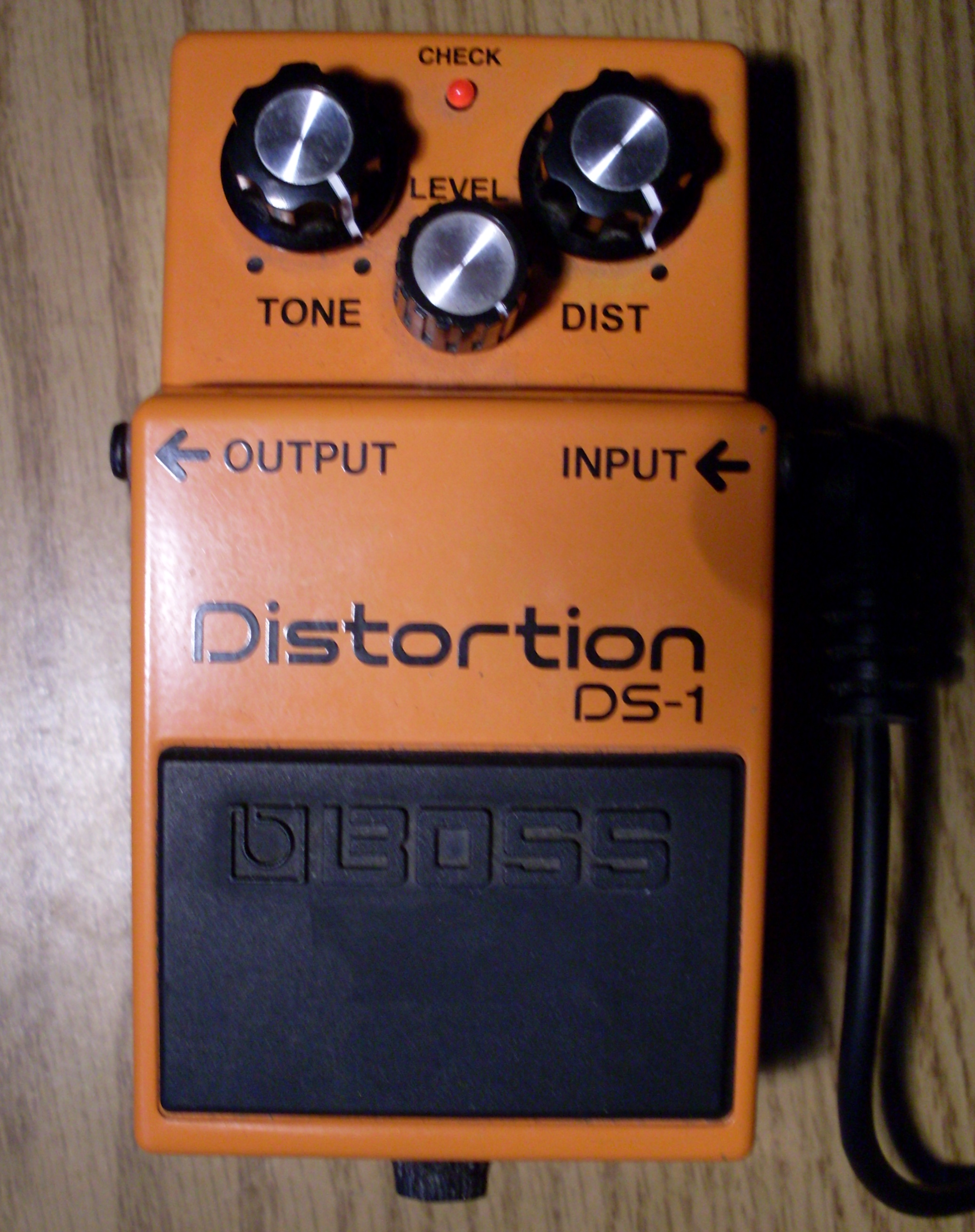
A Boss DS-1, one of the most widely used distortion pedals

An auditory example of the distortion effect with the clean signal shown first.

Distortion and overdrive are forms of audio signal processing used to alter the sound of amplified electric musical instruments, usually by increasing their gain, producing a "fuzzy", "growling", or "gritty" tone. Distortion is most commonly used with the electric guitar, but may be used with other instruments, such as electric bass, electric piano, synthesizer, or Hammond organ. Guitarists playing electric blues originally obtained an overdriven sound by turning up their vacuum tube-powered guitar amplifiers to high volumes, which caused the signal to distort. Other ways to produce distortion have been developed since the 1960s, such as distortion effect pedals. The growling tone of a distorted electric guitar is a key part of many genres, including blues and many rock music genres, notably hard rock, punk rock, hardcore punk, acid rock, grunge and heavy metal music, while the use of distorted bass has been essential in a genre of hip hop music and alternative hip hop known as "SoundCloud rap".

The effects alter the instrument sound by clipping the signal (pushing it past its maximum, which shears off the peaks and troughs of the signal waves), adding sustain and harmonic and inharmonic overtones, leading to a compressed sound that is often described as "warm" and "dirty", depending on the type and intensity of distortion used. The terms distortion and overdrive are often used interchangeably; where a distinction is made, distortion is a more extreme version of the effect than overdrive. Fuzz is a particular form of extreme distortion originally created by guitarists using faulty equipment, such as a misaligned valve (tube), which has been emulated since the 1960s by a number of "fuzzbox" effects pedals.

Distortion, overdrive, and fuzz can be produced by effects pedals, rackmounts, pre-amplifiers, power amplifiers (a potentially speaker-blowing approach), loudspeakers and (since the 2000s) digital amplifier modeling devices and audio software. These effects are used with electric guitars, electric basses (fuzz bass), electronic keyboards, and more rarely, special effects with vocals. While distortion is often created intentionally as a musical effect, musicians and sound engineers sometimes take steps to avoid distortion, particularly when using PA systems to amplify vocals or when playing back prerecorded music.

== History ==
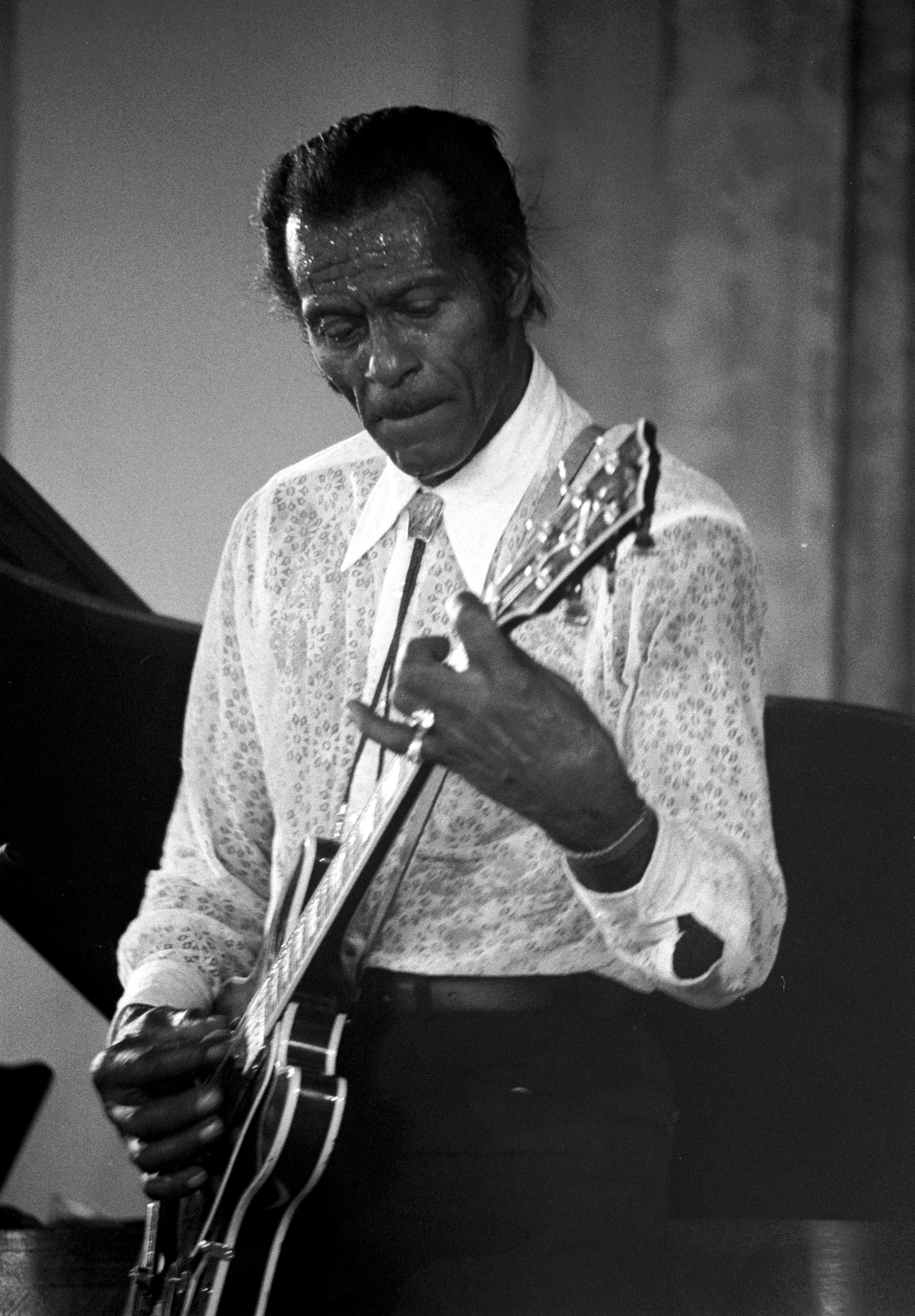
The guitar solo on Chuck Berry's 1955 single "Maybellene" features "warm" overtone distortion produced by an inexpensive valve (tube) amplifier.

=== Early uses of amplified distortion ===
The first guitar amplifiers were relatively low-fidelity, and would often produce distortion when their volume (gain) was increased beyond their design limit or if they sustained minor damage. From 1935, Western swing guitarist Bob Dunn began experimenting with a distorted or "dirty" tone. Later, around 1945, Western swing guitarist and member of the Bob Wills band, Junior Barnard, began experimenting with a rudimentary humbucker pick-up and a small amplifier to obtain his signature "low-down and dirty" bluesy sound which allowed for more "fluid and funky" chords. Many electric blues guitarists, including Chicago bluesmen such as Elmore James and Buddy Guy, experimented to get a guitar sound that paralleled the rawness of blues singers such as Muddy Waters and Howlin' Wolf, replacing often their originals with the powerful Valco "Chicagoan" pick-ups, originally created for lap-steel, to obtain a louder and fatter tone. In early rock music, Goree Carter's "Rock Awhile" (1949) featured an over-driven electric guitar style similar to that of Chuck Berry several years later, as well as Joe Hill Louis' "Boogie in the Park" (1950).

In the early 1950s, guitar distortion sounds started to evolve based on sounds created earlier in the decade by accidental damage to amps, such as in the popular early recording of the 1951 Ike Turner and the Kings of Rhythm song "Rocket 88", where guitarist Willie Kizart used a vacuum tube amplifier that had a speaker cone slightly damaged in transport. Electric guitarists began "doctoring" amplifiers and speakers to emulate this form of distortion.

Electric blues guitarist Willie Johnson of Howlin' Wolf′s band began deliberately increasing gain beyond its intended levels to produce "warm" distorted sounds. Guitar Slim also experimented with distorted overtones, which can be heard in his hit electric blues song "The Things That I Used to Do" (1953). Chuck Berry's 1955 classic "Maybellene" features a guitar solo with warm overtones created by his small valve amplifier. Pat Hare produced heavily distorted power chords on his electric guitar for records such as James Cotton's "Cotton Crop Blues" (1954) as well as his "I'm Gonna Murder My Baby" (1954), creating "a grittier, nastier, more ferocious electric guitar sound", accomplished by turning the volume knob on his amplifier "all the way to the right until the speaker was screaming."

In 1956, guitarist Paul Burlison of the Johnny Burnette Trio deliberately dislodged a vacuum tube in his amplifier to record "The Train Kept A-Rollin" after a reviewer raved about the sound Burlison's damaged amplifier produced during a live performance. According to other sources, Burlison's amp had a partially broken loudspeaker cone. Pop-oriented producers were horrified by that eerie "two-tone" sound, quite clean on trebles but strongly distorted on basses, but Burnette insisted on releasing the sessions, arguing that "that guitar sounds like a nice horn section".

In the late 1950s, guitarist Link Wray began manipulating his amplifiers' vacuum tubes to create a "noisy" and "dirty" sound for his solos after a similarly accidental discovery. Wray also poked holes in his speaker cones with pencils to further distort his tone, used electronic echo chambers (then usually employed by singers), the recent powerful and "fat" Gibson humbucker pickups, and controlled "feedback" (Larsen effect). The resultant sound can be heard on his highly influential 1958 instrumentals, "Rumble" and "Rawhide".

=== 1960s: fuzz, distortion, and introduction of commercial devices ===
In 1961, Grady Martin scored a hit with a fuzzy tone caused by a faulty preamplifier that distorted his six-string bass guitar playing on the Marty Robbins song "Don't Worry". Later that year, Martin recorded an instrumental tune under his own name, using the same faulty preamp. The song, on the Decca label, was called "The Fuzz". Martin is generally credited as the discoverer of the "fuzz effect". The recording engineer from Martin's sessions, Glenn Snoddy, partnered with fellow WSM radio engineer Revis V. Hobbs to design and build a stand-alone device that would intentionally create the fuzzy effect. The two engineers sold their circuit to Gibson, who introduced it as the Maestro FZ-1 Fuzz-Tone in 1962, one of the first commercially-successful mass-produced guitar pedals.

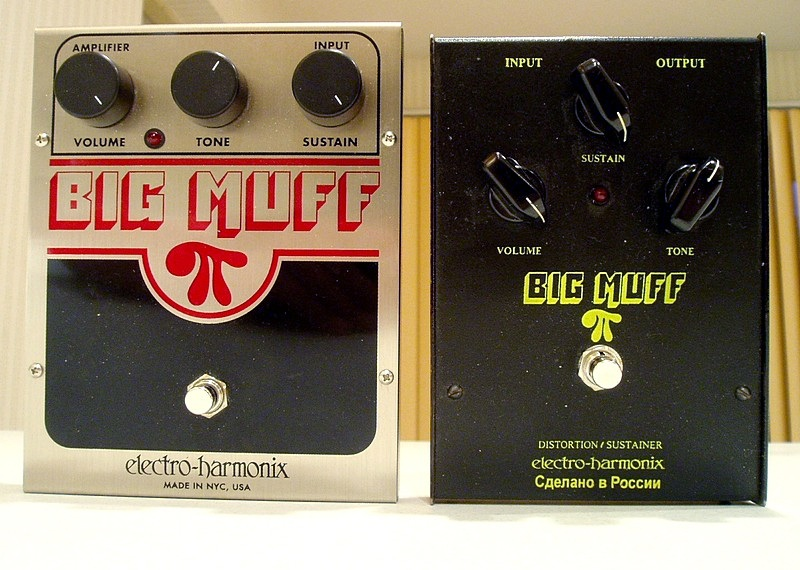
Big Muff fuzzboxes: a NYC re-issue (L) and a Russian Sovtek version (R)

Shortly thereafter, the American instrumental rock band The Ventures asked their friend, session musician and electronics enthusiast Orville "Red" Rhodes for help recreating the Grady Martin "fuzz" sound. Rhodes offered The Ventures a fuzzbox he had made, which they used to record "2000 Pound Bee" in 1962.

In 1964, a fuzzy and somewhat distorted sound gained widespread popularity after guitarist Dave Davies of The Kinks used a razor blade to slash his speaker cones for the band's single "You Really Got Me".

In May 1965, Keith Richards used a Maestro FZ-1 Fuzz-Tone to record "(I Can't Get No) Satisfaction". The song's success greatly boosted sales of the device, and all available stock sold out by the end of 1965. Other early fuzzboxes include the Rush Pepbox (1964), the Mosrite FuzzRITE and Arbiter Group Fuzz Face used by Jimi Hendrix, the Electro-Harmonix Big Muff Pi used by Hendrix and Carlos Santana, and the Vox Tone Bender used by Paul McCartney to play fuzz bass on "Think for Yourself" and other Beatles recordings.

In 1966, Jim Marshall of the Marshall Amplification company began modifying the electronic circuitry of his amplifiers so as to achieve a "brighter, louder" sound and fuller distortion capabilities.

In the late 1960s and early 1970s, hard rock bands such as Deep Purple, Led Zeppelin and Black Sabbath forged what would eventually become the heavy metal sound through a combined use of high volumes and heavy distortion.

== Theory and circuits ==
Waveform plot showing the different types of clipping. Valve overdrive is a form of soft limiting, while transistor clipping or extremely overdriven valves resemble hard clipping.

The word distortion refers to any modification of wave form of a signal, but in music it is used to refer to nonlinear distortion (excluding filters) and particularly to the introduction of new frequencies by memoryless nonlinearities. In music, the different forms of linear distortion have specific names. The simplest of these is a distortion process known as "volume adjustment", which involves distorting the amplitude of a sound wave in a proportional (or "linear") way in order to increase or decrease the volume of the sound without affecting the tone quality. In the context of music, the most common source of (nonlinear) distortion is clipping in amplifier circuits and is most commonly known as overdrive.

Clipping is a non-linear process that produces frequencies not originally present in the audio signal. These frequencies can be harmonic, meaning they are whole number multiples of one of the signal's original frequencies, or "inharmonic" overtones, resulting from general intermodulation distortion. The same nonlinear device will produce both types of distortion, depending on the input signal. Intermodulation occurs whenever the input frequencies are not already harmonically related. For instance, playing a power chord through distortion results in intermodulation that produces new subharmonics.

"Soft clipping" gradually flattens the peaks of a signal which creates a number of higher harmonics which share a harmonic relationship with the original tone. "Hard clipping" flattens peaks abruptly, resulting in higher power in higher harmonics. As clipping increases, a tone input progressively begins to resemble a square wave which has odd number harmonics. This is generally described as sounding "harsh".

Distortion and overdrive circuits each "clip" the signal before it reaches the main amplifier (clean boost circuits do not necessarily create "clipping") as well as boost signals to levels that cause distortion to occur at the main amplifier's front end stage by exceeding the ordinary input signal amplitude, thus overdriving the amplifier. (Note: Product names may not accurately reflect the type of circuit involved—see above.)

A fuzz box alters an audio signal until it is nearly a square wave and adds complex overtones by way of a frequency multiplier.

=== Valve overdrive ===
Triode valve

Vacuum tube or "valve" distortion is achieved by "overdriving" the valves in an amplifier. In layman's terms, overdriving is pushing the tubes beyond their normal rated maximum. Valve amplifiers—particularly those using class-A triodes—tend to produce asymmetric soft clipping that creates both even and odd harmonics. The increase in even harmonics is considered to create "warm"-sounding overdrive effects.

A basic triode valve (tube) contains a cathode, a plate, and a grid. When a positive voltage is applied to the plate, a current of negatively charged electrons flows to it from the heated cathode through the grid. This increases the voltage of the audio signal, amplifying its volume. The grid regulates the extent to which plate voltage is increased. A small negative voltage applied to the grid causes a large decrease in plate voltage.

Valve amplification is more or less linear—meaning the parameters (amplitude, frequency, and phase) of the amplified signal are proportional to the input signal—so long as the voltage of the input signal does not exceed the valve's "linear region of operation". The linear region falls between

1. The saturation region: the voltages at which plate current stops responding to positive increases in grid voltage, and
2. The cutoff region: the voltages at which the charge of the grid is too negative for current to flow to the plate. If a valve is biased within the linear region and the input signal's voltage exceeds this region, overdrive and non-linear clipping will occur.

Multiple stages of valve gain/clipping can be "cascaded" to produce a thicker and more complex distortion sound. In layperson's terms, a musician will plug a fuzz pedal into a tube amp that is being "cranked" to a clipping "overdriven" condition; as such, the musician will get the distortion from the fuzz which is then distorted further by the amp. During the 1990s, some Seattle grunge guitarists chained together as many as four fuzz pedals to create a thick "wall of sound" of distortion.

In some modern valve effects, the "dirty" or "gritty" tone is actually achieved not by high voltage, but by running the circuit at voltages that are too low for the circuit components, resulting in greater non-linearity and distortion. These designs are referred to as "starved plate" configurations, and result in an "amp death" sound.

=== Solid-state distortion ===
Solid-state amplifiers incorporating transistors and/or op amps can be made to produce hard clipping. When symmetrical, this adds additional high-amplitude odd harmonics, creating a "dirty" or "gritty" tone. When asymmetrical, it produces both even and odd harmonics. Electronically, this is usually achieved by either amplifying the signal to a point where it is clipped by the DC voltage limitation of the power supply rail, or by clipping the signal with diodes. Many solid-state distortion devices attempt to emulate the sound of overdriven vacuum valves using additional solid-state circuitry. Some amplifiers (notably the Marshall JCM 900) utilize hybrid designs that employ both valve and solid-state components.

== Approaches ==
Guitar distortion can be produced by many components of the guitar's signal path, including effects pedals, the pre-amplifier, power amplifier, and speakers. Many players use a combination of these to obtain their "signature" tone.

=== Pre-amplifier distortion ===
The pre-amplifier section of a guitar amplifier serves to amplify a weak instrument signal to a level that can drive the power amplifier. It often also contains circuitry to shape the tone of the instrument, including equalization and gain controls. Often multiple cascading gain/clipping stages are employed to generate distortion. Because the first component in a valve amplifier is a valve gain stage, the output level of the preceding elements of the signal chain has a strong influence on the distortion created by that stage. The output level of the guitar's pickups, the setting of the guitar's volume knob, how hard the strings are plucked, and the use of volume-boosting effects pedals can drive this stage harder and create more distortion.

During the 1980s and 1990s, most valve amps featured a "master volume" control, an adjustable attenuator between the preamp section, and the power amp. When the preamp volume is set high to generate high distortion levels, the master volume is lowered, keeping the output volume at manageable levels.

=== Effects pedals ===
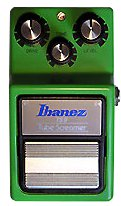
The Ibanez TS9 Tube Screamer is a popular overdrive pedal

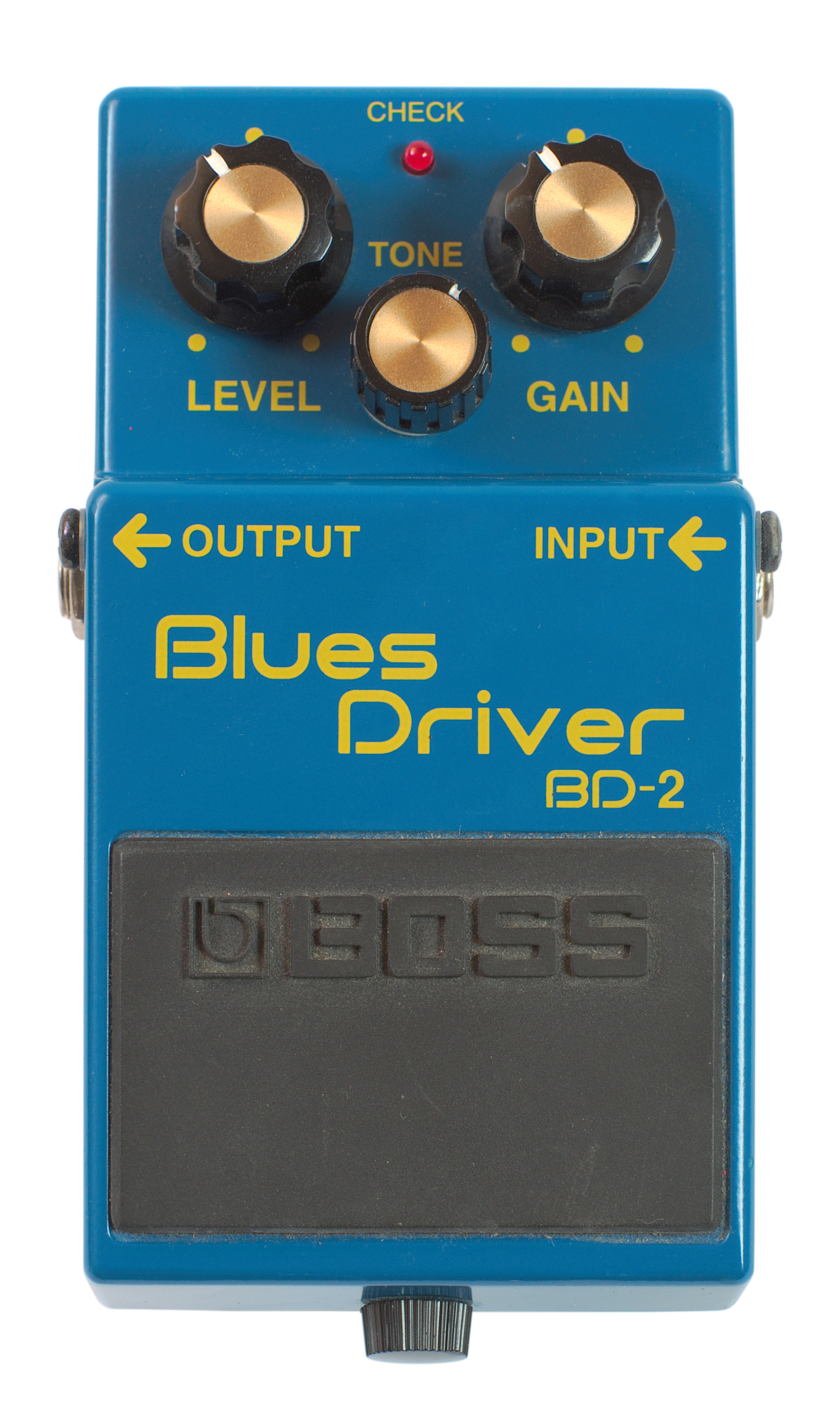
The Boss BD-2 Blues Driver

Demo of a Big Muff

Effects pedals are among the earliest and most widely used tools for producing intentional distortion in electric guitar performance. Compared to valve amplifiers, effects pedals offer a more affordable, portable, and versatile means of achieving a wide range of overdrive, distortion, and fuzz tones.

Analog effects pedals work on similar principles to preamplifier distortion. Because most effects pedals are designed to operate from battery voltages, using vacuum tubes to generate distortion and overdrive is impractical; instead, most pedals use solid-state transistors, op-amps, and diodes. Classic examples of distortion effects pedals include the Boss OD series (overdrives), the Ibanez Tube Screamer (an overdrive), the Electro-Harmonix Big Muff Pi (a fuzz box), and the Pro Co RAT (a distortion).

Although the terms are sometimes used interchangeably, guitarists and manufacturers typically distinguish between overdrive, distortion, and fuzz. Generally, overdrive pedals aim to simulate the sound of a tube amplifier pushed into saturation, providing a dynamic response to picking intensity. The first effects pedals strictly marketed as "overdrive" were aimed at players who wanted the characteristic "amp breakup" tone without having to play at very high volume levels or risk damaging their equipment. Distortion pedals produce a coloured, more compressed and heavily saturated tone, less dependent on playing dynamics; as such, they are often paired with relatively clean amplifiers so that the pedal provides the bulk of the distortion. Fuzz pedals, which date back to the 1960s, use extreme clipping to generate a buzzy, harmonically rich sound that can resemble a square wave. This is traditionally done with the use of transistors rather than op amps making the fuzz notoriously touchy. Newer models often have features to mitigate the drawbacks of this behavior.

Classic examples of overdrive pedals include the Ibanez Tube Screamer and the Boss OD series. Distortion pedals include the Pro Co RAT and Boss DS-1, which both found use in heavier guitar based music like grunge and alternative rock, while fuzz pedals like the Electro-Harmonix Big Muff Pi create a sustaining, harmonically rich sound.

Most distortion effects pedals can be used in two ways: a pedal can be used as a "boost" with an already overdriven amplifier to drive it further into saturation and "color" the tone, or it can be used with a completely clean amplifier to generate the whole overdrive/distortion effect. With care and appropriately chosen pedals, it is possible to "stack" multiple overdrive/distortion pedals together, allowing one pedal to act as a "boost" for another.

Fuzz boxes and other heavy distortions can produce unwanted dissonances when playing chords. To get around this, guitarists (and keyboardists) using these effects may restrict their playing to single notes and simple "power chords" (root, fifth, and octave). Indeed, with the most extreme fuzz pedals, players may choose to play mostly single notes, because the fuzz can make even single notes sound very thick and heavy. Heavy distortion also tends to limit the player's control of dynamics (loudness and softness)—similar to the limitations imposed on a Hammond organ player (Hammond organs do not produce louder or softer sounds depending on how hard or soft the performer plays the keys; however, the performer can still control the volume with drawbars and the expression pedal). Heavy metal music has evolved around these restrictions, using complex rhythms and timing for expression and excitement. Lighter distortions and overdrives can be used with triadic chords and seventh chords; additionally, lighter overdrive allows more control of dynamics.

=== Power amplifier distortion ===
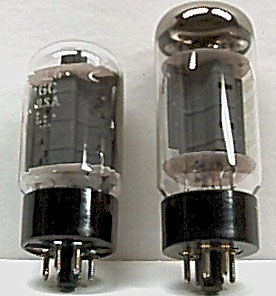
A pair of 6L6GC power valves, often used in American-made amplifiers

Power valves (tubes) can be overdriven in the same way that pre-amplifier valves can, but because these valves are designed to output more power, the distortion and character they add to the guitar's tone is unique. During the 1960s to early 1970s, distortion was primarily created by overdriving the power valves. Because they have become accustomed to this sound, many guitar players favour this type of distortion, and thus set their amps to maximum levels in order to drive the power section hard. Many valve-based amplifiers in common use have a push-pull output configuration in their power section, with matched pairs of tubes driving the output transformer. Power amplifier distortion is normally entirely symmetric, generating predominantly odd-order harmonics.

Because driving the power valves this hard also means maximum volume, which can be difficult to manage in a small recording or rehearsal space, many solutions have emerged that divert some of this power valve output from the speakers, and allow the player to generate power valve distortion without excessive volume. These include built-in or separate power attenuators and power-supply-based power attenuation, such as a VVR, or Variable Voltage Regulator to drop the voltage on the valves' plates, to increase distortion whilst lowering volume. Guitarists such as Eddie Van Halen have been known to use variacs before VVR technology was invented. Lower-power valve amps (such as a quarter-watt or less), speaker isolation cabinets, and low-efficiency guitar speakers are also used to tame the volume.

Power-valve distortion can also be produced in a dedicated rackmount valve power amp. A modular rackmount setup often involves a rackmount preamp, a rackmount valve power amp, and a rackmount dummy load to attenuate the output to desired volume levels. Some effects pedals internally produce power-valve distortion, including an optional dummy load for use as a power-valve distortion pedal. Such effects units can use a preamp valve such as the 12AX7 in a power-valve circuit configuration (as in the Stephenson's Stage Hog), or use a conventional power valve, such as the EL84 (as in the H&K Crunch Master compact tabletop unit). However, because these are usually placed before the pre-amplifier in the signal chain, they contribute to the overall tone in a different way. Power amplifier distortion may damage speakers.

A Direct Inject signal can capture the power-tube distortion sound without the direct coloration of a guitar speaker and microphone. This DI signal can be blended with a miked guitar speaker, with the DI providing a more present, immediate, bright sound, and the miked guitar speaker providing a colored, remote, darker sound. The DI signal can be obtained from a DI jack on the guitar amp, or from the Line Out jack of a power attenuator.

=== Output transformer distortion ===
The output transformer sits between the power valves and the speaker, serving to match impedance. When a transformer's ferromagnetic core becomes electromagnetically saturated, a loss of inductance takes place, since the back E.M.F. is reliant on a change in flux in the core. As the core reaches saturation, the flux levels off and cannot increase any further. With no change in flux, there is no back E.M.F. and hence no reflected impedance. The transformer and valve combination then generate large 3rd order harmonics. So long as the core does not go into saturation, the valves will clip naturally as they drop the available voltage across them. In single ended systems, the output harmonics will be largely even ordered due to the valve's relatively non linear characteristics at large signal swings. This is only true, however, if the magnetic core does not saturate.

=== Power supply "sag" ===
Early valve amplifiers used unregulated power supplies. This was due to the high cost associated with high-quality high-voltage power supplies. The typical anode (plate) supply was simply a rectifier, an inductor and a capacitor. When the valve amplifier was operated at high volume, the power supply voltage would dip, reducing power output and causing signal attenuation and compression. This dipping effect is known as "sag", and is sought after by some electric guitarists. Sag only occurs in class-AB amplifiers. This is because, technically, sag results from more current being drawn from the power supply, causing a greater voltage drop over the rectifier valve. Class AB amplifiers draw the most power at both the maximum and minimum point of the signal, putting more stress on the power supply than class A, which only draws maximum power at the peak of the signal.

As this effect is more pronounced with higher input signals, the harder "attack" of a note will be compressed more heavily than the lower-voltage "decay", making the latter seem louder and thereby improving sustain. Additionally, because the level of compression is affected by input volume, the player can control it via their playing intensity: playing harder results in more compression or "sag". In contrast, modern amplifiers often use high-quality, well-regulated power supplies.

=== Speaker distortion ===
Guitar loudspeakers are designed differently from high fidelity stereo speakers or public address system speakers. While hi-fi and public address speakers are designed to reproduce the sound with as little distortion as possible, guitar speakers are usually designed so that they will shape or color the tone of the guitar, either by enhancing some frequencies or attenuating unwanted frequencies.

When the power delivered to a guitar speaker approaches its maximum rated power, the speaker's performance degrades, causing the speaker to "break up", adding further distortion and colouration to the signal. Some speakers are designed to have much clean headroom, while others are designed to break up early to deliver grit and growl.

=== Amp modeling for distortion emulation ===
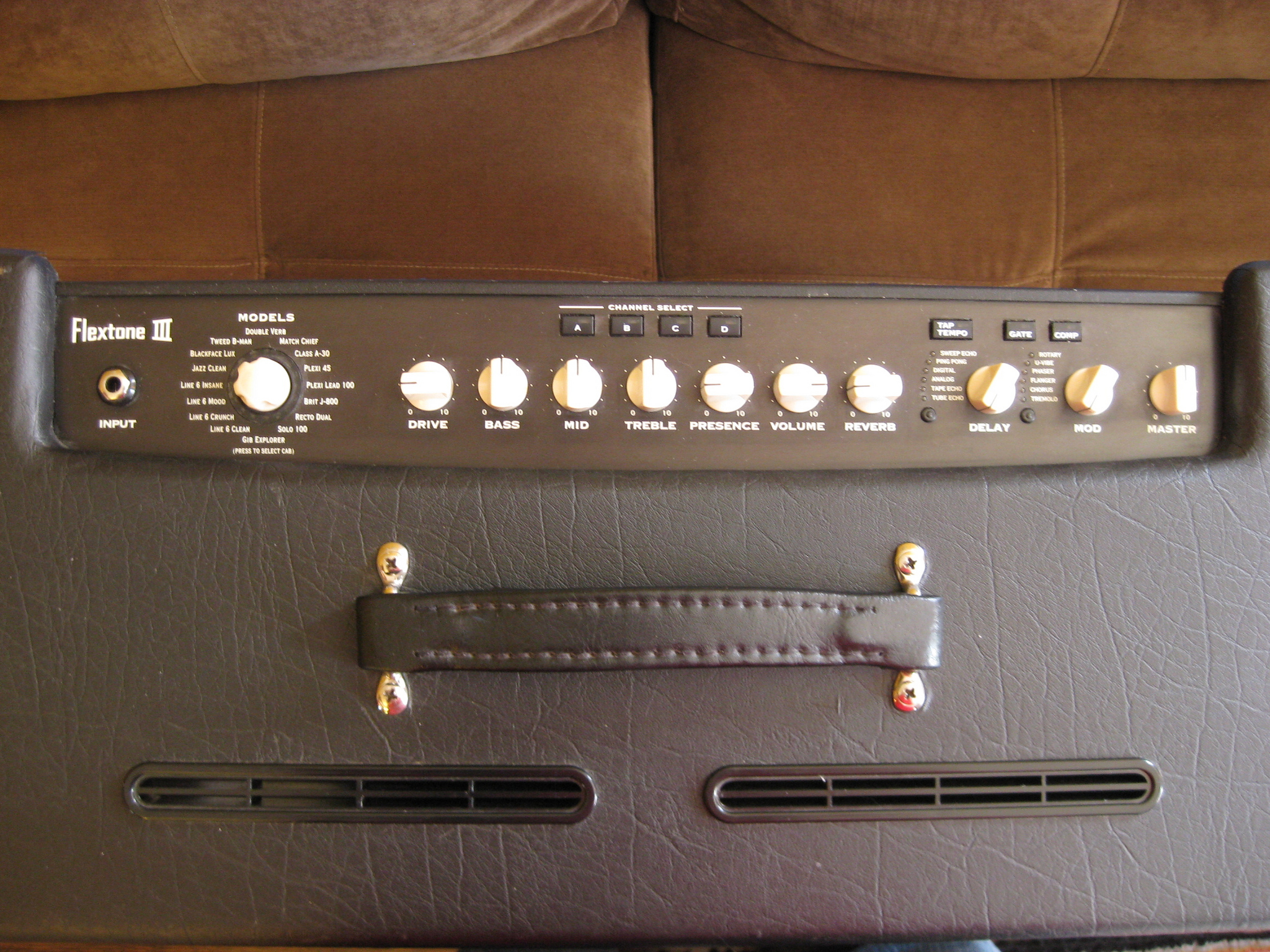
A Line 6 modeling amplifier shown from above. Note the various amplifier and speaker emulations selectable via the rotary knob on the left.

Guitar amp modeling devices and software can reproduce various guitar-specific distortion qualities that are associated with a range of popular "stomp box" pedals and amplifiers. Amp modeling devices typically use digital signal processing to recreate the sound of plugging into analogue pedals and overdriven valve amplifiers. The most sophisticated devices allow the user to customize the simulated results of using different preamp, power-tube, speaker distortion, speaker cabinet, and microphone placement combinations. For example, a guitarist using a small amp modeling pedal could simulate the sound of plugging their electric guitar into a heavy vintage valve amplifier and a stack of 8 × 10" speaker cabinets.

== Voicing with equalization ==
Guitar distortion is obtained and shaped at various points in the signal processing chain, including multiple stages of preamp distortion, power valve distortion, output and power transformer distortion, and guitar speaker distortion. Much of the distortion character or voicing is controlled by the frequency response before and after each distortion stage. This dependency of distortion voicing on frequency response can be heard in the effect that a wah pedal has on the subsequent distortion stage, or by using tone controls built into the guitar, the preamp or an EQ pedal to favor the bass or treble components of the guitar pickup signal prior to the first distortion stage. Some guitarists place an equalizer pedal after the distortion effect, to emphasize or de-emphasize different frequencies in the distorted signal.

Increasing the bass and treble while reducing or eliminating the centre midrange (750 Hz) results in what is popularly known as a "scooped" sound (since the midrange frequencies are "scooped" out). Conversely, decreasing the bass while increasing the midrange and treble creates a punchy, harsher sound. Rolling off all of the treble produces a dark, heavy sound.

== Avoiding distortion ==
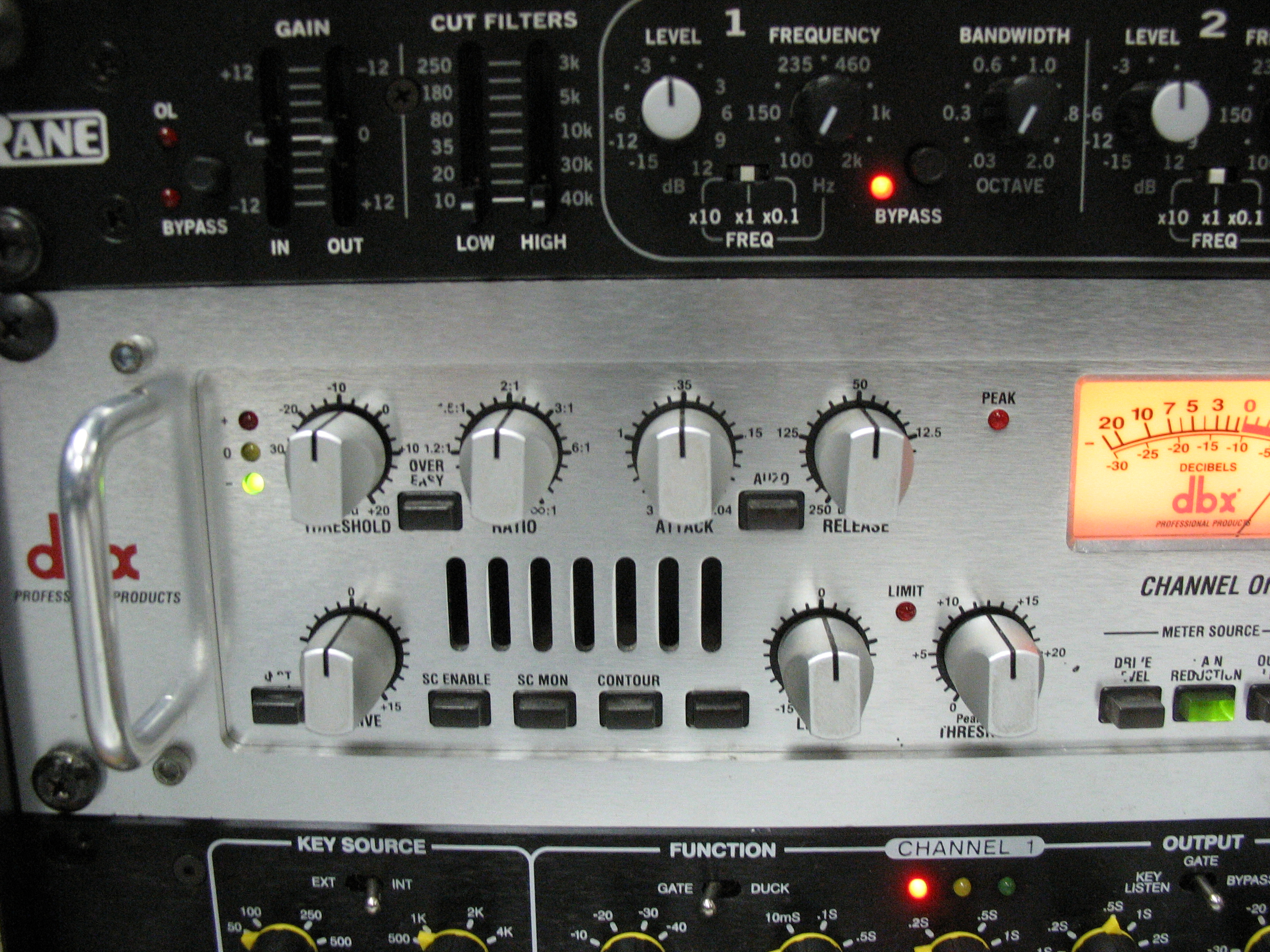
Electronic audio compression devices, such as this DBX 566, are used by audio engineers to prevent signal peaks from causing unwanted distortion.

While musicians intentionally create or add distortion to electric instrument signals or vocals to create a musical effect, there are some musical styles and musical applications where as little distortion as possible is sought. When DJs are playing recorded music in a nightclub, they typically seek to reproduce the recordings with little or no distortion. In many musical styles, including pop music, country music and even genres where the electric guitars are almost always distorted, such as heavy metal, punk, and hard rock, sound engineers usually take a number of steps to ensure that the vocals sounding through the sound reinforcement system are undistorted (the exception is the rare cases where distortion is purposely added to vocals in a song as a special effect, mainly in industrial music genres).

Sound engineers prevent unwanted, unintended distortion and clipping using a number of methods. They may reduce the gain on microphone preamplifiers on the audio console; use attenuation "pads" (a button on audio console channel strips, DI unit and some bass amplifiers); and use electronic audio compressor effects and limiters to prevent sudden volume peaks from vocal mics causing unwanted distortion.

Some bass guitar players in metal and punk bands intentionally use fuzz bass to distort their bass sound. Additionally, in some modern metal bands, bassists will use a digital modeler or distortion pedal such as a Darkglass Alpha-Omega to distort highs and mids while keeping low frequencies clean, so as to retain an aggressive sound without getting lost in a mix. In most other genres of music, such as pop, big band jazz and traditional country music, bass players typically seek an undistorted bass sound. To obtain a clear, undistorted bass sound, professional bass players in these genres use high-powered amplifiers with a lot of "headroom" and they may also use audio compressors to prevent sudden volume peaks from causing distortion. In many cases, musicians playing stage pianos or synthesizers use keyboard amplifiers that are designed to reproduce the audio signal with as little distortion as possible. The exceptions with keyboards are the Hammond organ as used in blues and the Fender Rhodes as used in rock music; with these instruments and genres, keyboardists often purposely overdrive a tube amplifier to get a natural overdrive sound. Another example of instrument amplification where as little distortion as possible is sought is with acoustic instrument amplifiers, designed for musicians playing instruments such as the mandolin or fiddle in a folk or bluegrass style.

== See also ==
- Distortion meter
- Guitar pedalboard
- List of distortion pedals
- Tube sound/Valve sound
