= Tom Anderson Guitarworks =

American manufacturer of electric guitars and guitar pickups

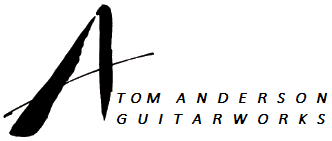
- Company type: Private
- Industry: Musical instruments
- Founded: 1984; 42 years ago
- Founder: Tom Anderson
- Headquarters: United States
- Products: Electric guitars and pickups
- Website: andersonguitarworks.com

Tom Anderson Guitarworks is an American manufacturer of electric guitars and guitar pickups, based in Newbury Park, California. The company was started in 1984 by Tom Anderson, who is regarded as "one of the most respected names in the […] custom guitar market." They manufacture about 1200 instruments per year and have a reputation for "consistently high build quality, superb playability and innovative tones." Their Atom model was featured in Guitarist magazine's "50 guitars to play before you die".

== History ==
Tom Anderson started out working for Dave Schecter (founder of Schecter Guitar Co.) in 1977 and stayed until the company was sold in 1984. Dave Schecter told Anderson "If you really want to do what you want, you need to start your own company", which led Anderson to start his own company. Their first contract was building pickups for Schecter Japan, and during the first year they were manufactured in Anderson's garage.

After moving to a dedicated building they also started making guitar bodies and necks, which were sold to John Suhr (Pensa-Suhr), Roger Sadowsky, and Jim Tyler. Until 1987, the company's focus was producing parts for others, but that year they brought some completed guitars to the NAMM Show and signed with several dealers. In the following years sales grew, and in 1990 they stopped selling parts to focus solely on building completed instruments. To further internalise the production, they started doing their own paintwork in 1992, and by 1993 the only parts they don't manufacture themselves are metal pieces like tuners and bridges.

The company has pioneered custom guitar manufacturing in several ways. In 1988 they were the first company to use a multi-purpose CNC machine, which now is commonly used in the business to maintain consistency in manufacturing. Tom Anderson and Bob Taylor worked together to adapt ultra-violet lighting to use for curing painted instruments, and the process is now used by several high-end acoustic guitar manufacturers. In 2006 their models started featuring a new neck joint called A-Wedgie, a compound wedge that requires little pressure to keep the neck in place and thus only uses two screws while most common joints use four. The company has also used the Buzz Feiten tuning system on their guitars for many years, because it "offers a marked improvement in playing in tune", according to Tom Anderson.

Tom Anderson announced in late 2006 that he would downsize the company to a one-man operation because it was wearing him out. A few weeks later another announcement came, reversing the previous one after Anderson and the company received an "outpouring of support for our guitars and the company as a whole." The entire team continued without pause, and in 2012 moved to a much larger, state-of-the-art facility less than a mile away.

== Models ==
Seven body shapes are available, and each of them has their own set of distinct models and options:

- S, based on the Fender Stratocaster (variants include The Classic, Icon Classic, Pro Am, Drop Top, Drop Top Classic)
- T, based on the Fender Telecaster (variants include T Classic, T Icon, Top T, Top T Classic, Mongrel, Drop Mongrel, Pro Am T)
- Angel, based on the 24-fret Superstrat (variants include Angel, Angel Player, Arc Angel, Arc Angel Player, Guardian Angel, Guardian Angel Player)
- Angel 7, a seven-string guitar, based on the 24-fret Superstrat (variants include Angel 7, Angel Player 7)
- Baritom, a longer 28.625” scale length model which enables bigger strings to be tuned B to B, based on the Fender Stratocaster (variants include Baritom Classic, Baritom Drop Top, Baritom Drop Top Classic, Baritone Pro Am,)
- Bobcat, a single-cut model based on the Gibson Les Paul (variants include Bobcat, Bobcat Special, Bobcat Locker)
- Cobra, a range with 24.75 scale lengths (variants include Cobra, Cobra Special, Cobra S, Cobra S Special)
- Crowdster, an acoustic-electric guitar (variants include Crowdster, Crowdster Plus, Crowdster Plus 2, Crowdster Player)
- Raven, based on the Fender Jazzmaster (variants include Raven, Raven Superbird)

== Notable users ==
- Joan Armatrading
- Clint Black
- Vivian Campbell
- Mike Campese
- David Crosby
- Christopher Cross
- David Crowder
- Keith Howland
- Michael Landau
- Jim Lill
- David Marks
- Kirk Hammett
- Keith Richards
- Neal Schon
- Bob Seger
- Nigel Tufnel
- Mike Turner
- Brad Whitford
