= Distortion meter =

Electronic test equipment

A distortion meter is a type of electronic test equipment used to determine specific frequencies that cause distortion in electronic devices. The device is primarily used in audio related equipment.

== Features and uses ==
A typical unit injects a signal in to the input of a circuit and monitors the output of the circuit for distortion.

== Types of distortion ==
1. Amplitude distortion.
2. Frequency distortion.
3. Phase distortion.
4. Intermodulation distortion.
5. Cross over distortion.

== See also ==
- Electronic test equipment
