= Isolation cabinet (guitar) =

Sound-proof enclosure for a guitar amplifier

A guitar speaker isolation cabinet is a sound-proof enclosure that surrounds the speaker and sound-capturing microphone and prevents sound leakage into the outside environment, enabling the guitar amplifier to be turned up without excessive listening volume. An amplifier and speaker at full volume can be extremely loud, posing a risk to hearing and an annoyance to neighbors, and will often drown out other instruments in a mix in live shows. In a recording studio, the sound of an amplifier at full volume may spill into the microphones for other instrumentalists.

The characteristic sound of a tube guitar amplifier as heard on the majority of professional recordings is achieved by playing the amplifier at high volumes and using one or more microphones to capture the sound. Turning the volume up causes the pre-amplifier to overdrive and it drives the power amplifier into distortion and the loudspeaker to "break up", adding intentional distortion to the amplified tone.

== Sizes and types ==
A guitar speaker isolation cabinet has a built-in mounting baffle for a guitar speaker and a permanently mounted microphone clip. A compact isolation cabinet contains a small guitar speaker such as 6½" diameter and sometimes an attached power attenuator to prevent blowing the speaker.

A guitar speaker isolation box is large enough to contain a standard guitar speaker cabinet such as a 1x12", 2x12" or 4x12" cabinet and a couple of compact microphone stands. Inexpensive but less effective DIY implementations of this approach are to put a guitar speaker and microphone in a closet, place gobo partitions around a speaker cabinet to somewhat deflect the sound, or form a tent with multiple layers of heavy blankets over a guitar speaker cabinet and microphone.

An isolation booth is a small room large enough to contain a single performer along with a rig, enabling the instrument to interact with the amplifier while isolating the rest of the band from the extreme volume.

Finally, the live room of a recording studio provides sound isolation between an entire band and the control room, allowing the studio engineers to work at manageable volumes and prevent listener fatigue.

The frequency response of an isolation system depends on the number of microphones, the type of microphones, microphone positioning, cabinet dimensions, speaker size, speaker model, and the amount of sound-absorption material inside the isolation cabinet. To control the resulting response, a dedicated equalizer can be used to enhance or reduce specific frequency ranges. The small volume of an isolation cabinet does not produce audible room reverberation, so the sound generally has to be enhanced with an electronic reverb.

== Degree of sound isolation ==
A single-layer isolation cabinet or isolation box reduces the sound but does not make the speaker silent; significant bass leaks out. A double-layer box with dead space between the layers still leaks audible bass, if typical plywood thickness is used. Getting closer to silencing would require two very massive layers of plywood, MDF board, or soundproofing board such as Homasote or Wonderboard. An additional layer may be needed, such as for a 100-watt guitar amp with multiple efficient guitar speakers inside the box.

== Combined approaches ==
To reduce the volume leakage or to prevent blowing the speaker or microphone, a power attenuator is sometimes used between the tube power amp and the guitar speaker in the isolation box. This reduces the power delivered to the speaker and thus the volume, but has some effect on speaker and microphone response.

To reduce volume on stage while staying near to a traditional guitar amp setup, a guitar amp can drive two parallel loads: a power attenuator driving a conventional guitar speaker cabinet (with no microphone), and a speaker isolation cabinet providing the signal for the mixer board and sound reinforcement system.

A speaker isolation cabinet can be combined with a Direct Inject signal. A DI signal is run from the guitar amplifier or from a guitar amp power attenuator to one channel of the mixing console. A miked guitar speaker in an isolation cabinet is run into another channel of the mixing console. The DI signal and miked guitar speaker can then be selectively blended, with the DI providing a more immediate, present, bright sound, and the microphone and guitar speaker providing a colored, distant, darker sound.

== Over stressing components ==
"Cranking an amp" means turning up a guitar power amplifier well into the region at which power-tube distortion is produced, generating as much as twice the amplifier's rated non-distorting wattage. Pushing a guitar amp to such an extent can destroy components of an amplifier whether using an isolation cabinet, dummy load, power attenuator, or conventional guitar speaker cabinet. In particular, tubes wear more quickly when they are consistently pushed into saturation.

Blowing a speaker is a possibility when using an isolation cabinet due to reduced audio perception levels. A blown speaker usually has a broken wire in the coil and would need to be reconed. A blown speaker appears as an open or infinite resistance to the tube power amplifier and can "fry" expensive components in the amp, such as the output transformer or power tubes, which would then need to be replaced.

== See also ==
- Power attenuator (guitar)
- DI unit
- Soundproofing
- Sound baffle
