= Power attenuator (guitar) =

Power Attenuator (Guitar Amplifier)

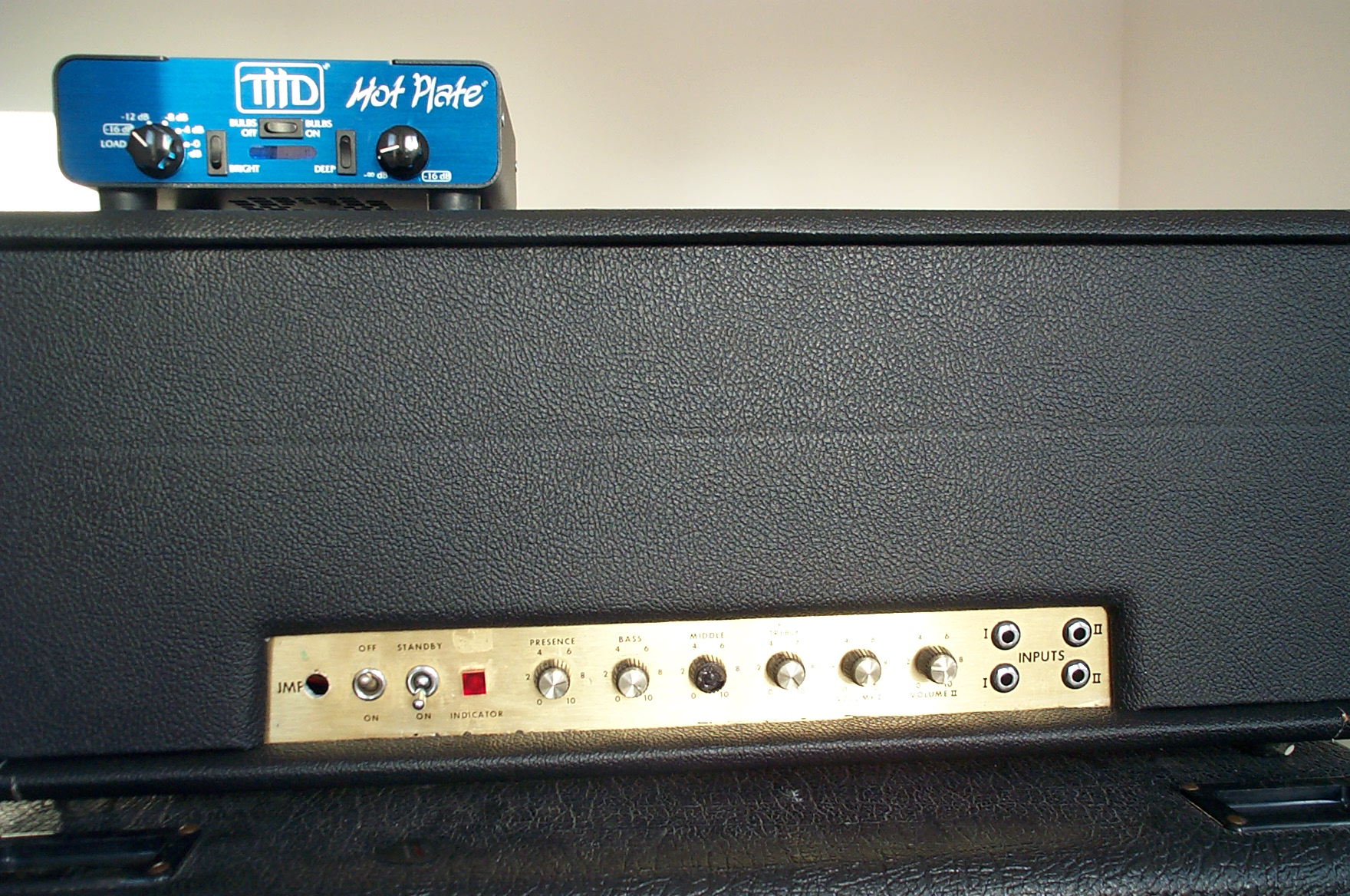
Power attenuator (THD Hot Plate) on Marshall 1959 Super Lead Plexi

A power attenuator, used with a guitar amplifier, is a type of attenuator that diverts and dissipates a portion of the amplifier's power to enable hearing the amplifiers high-volume characteristics at lower volume.

== Explanation ==
Musicians playing through vacuum tube guitar amplifiers sometimes want to produce distortion by overdriving the amplifier's output stage. Under such a condition, the amplifier is close to or at its maximum output power. The resulting volume level is unsuitable for many playing conditions. By reducing the power to the speaker, a power attenuator reduces the volume without altering the overdriven quality of the tone.

The most common approach to power attenuation is a power soaker, which absorbs a portion of the power and dissipates it as heat. This device connects between the amplifier output and the guitar speaker. A typical attenuator circuit is the L pad. A variable L pad is a power divider circuit that provides an adjustable power level to a speaker while maintaining a constant load impedance on the amplifier.

Another approach uses a variac or power scaling circuit, which reduces the B+ supply voltage available to the power tubes thus producing power tube distortion at a reduced level, while all available output power still goes to the guitar speaker. The Variac method bears the risk that voltage to the tubes can damage the filament or cathode if operated beyond manufacturer specifications. In a power scaling circuit, by decreasing just the B+ plate voltage, the cathode bias and screen grid voltage decrease proportionately, while the filament voltage stays constant. However the term power attenuator may be a misnomer for this type of power control, because lowering B+ voltage tends to increase distortion, where, by convention, an attenuator should not introduce distortion.

Power damping is an output level control method that involves the phase inverter and a potentiometer. The potentiometer lets the musician overdrive that at reduced output, similar to a post phase inverter master volume (PPIMV) control.

== Description ==
A power attenuator can be either purely resistive, or mostly resistive and partly reactive. The original guitar amp power attenuator, the Altair Attenuator, was primarily resistive, used a rotary switch to select taps on a toaster coil with low inductance windings. Another early model, simply called 'Power Attenuator' by Active Guitar Electronics, used continuously variable power rheostats. Other models, such as the Marshall Power Brake, add some electrical inductance or capacitance to the electrical load (including fans, light bulbs and coils). There is debate about whether reactive attenuators do a better job of preserving a guitar amplifier's tone.

A guitar amplifier power attenuator may also offer a line-level output jack for sending the distortion-processed signal through an effects chain, to a recording console, or for the purpose of re-amplifying signal through a larger or smaller amplifier.

If the amplifier is designed to accommodate routine full power use, an attenuator neither increases nor reduces the potential for amplifier damage. An early guitar amplifier that included a power attenuator was the Jim Kelley amplifier, which came with its own L-pad type attenuator. Some production attenuators are the Scholz Power Soak, Marshall Power Brake, THD Hot Plate, Weber MASS, Audiostorm HotBox and ARACOM.

== See also ==
- Power scaling
- Guitar amplifier
- Attenuator (electronics)
- Distortion (guitar)
- Isolation cabinet (guitar)
- Soundproofing
