= Suhr Guitars =

American guitar manufacturer

Suhr (JS Technologies, Inc.)
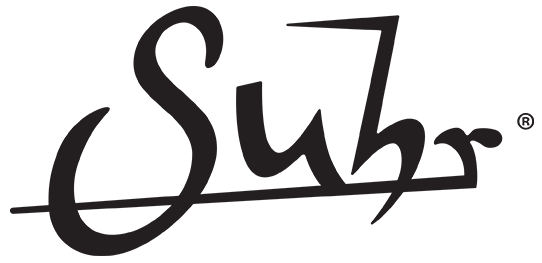
- Company type: Private
- Industry: Musical instruments
- Founded: 1997; 29 years ago
- Founder: John Suhr, Steve Smith
- Headquarters: Lake Elsinore, California, U.S., United States
- Area served: Worldwide
- Products: Electric guitars, bass guitars, amplifiers, pedals and pickups
- Website: suhr.com

Suhr Guitars (/ˈsər/ SUR; officially JS Technologies Inc) is an American company that manufactures electric guitars and basses, guitar amplifiers, and effect units. The company is based in Lake Elsinore, California and was founded in 1997 by John Suhr, who "has a reputation for building exquisitely crafted guitars" and Steve Smith.

== History ==
Prior to founding JS Technologies Inc, John Suhr had worked at Rudy's Music Stop in New York City doing guitar repair. He started building guitars in 1974, and he created the first Suhr Custom guitar in 1984. Teaming up with Rudy Pensa they started selling guitars under the Pensa-Suhr brand, and the signature model they built for former Dire Straits frontman Mark Knopfler is perhaps their most famous guitar.

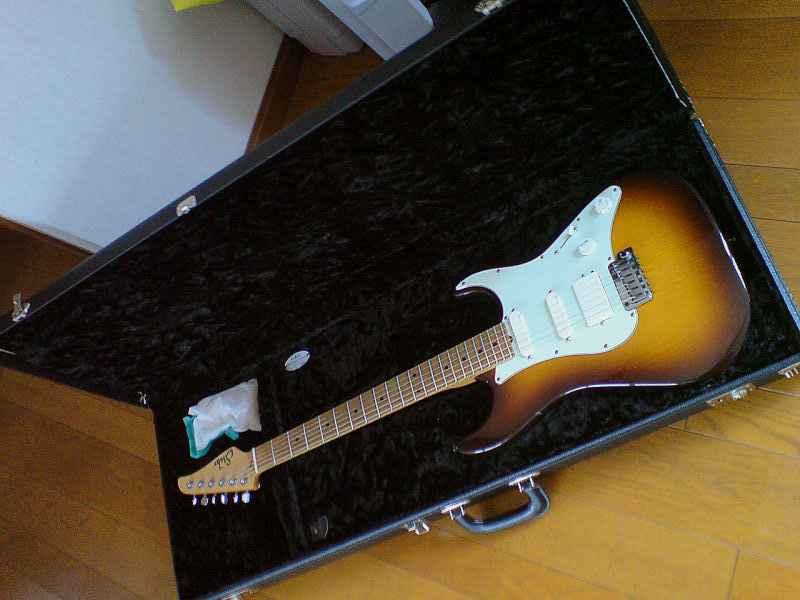
A tobacco sunburst Suhr Classic from the late 1990s with a maple neck and EMG pickups.

Around 1991, Suhr moved from NYC to Los Angeles to work with guitar rig builder Bob Bradshaw. Before leaving NYC they had collaborated on the design of a preamplifier, the Custom Audio Electronics (CAE) 3+, used for instance by Steve Lukather. They also designed a 100 watt amplifier head, the Custom Audio Amplifiers (CAA) OD-100. During this period 1991–1994, John Suhr built about 50 custom guitars and focused mainly on building amplifiers. Guitars from this period are more rare than guitars from the Pensa-Suhr era and can be identified by the 'built for" information handwritten by Suhr in the neck socket. From 1995 to 1997, John Suhr worked as Senior Master Builder at Fender's Custom Shop. In 1997 Suhr left Fender to form his own company with Steve Smith. Suhr had the knowledge about building guitars, Smith knew about management, software and CNC programming. Combining their efforts, they had total control of the manufacturing process and used the CNC routers to efficiently produce guitar necks and bodies, rather than doing it completely by hand. In the 1990s Suhr also made a name for himself making pickups, such as the custom-made single coils for Scott Henderson (Bill Frisell also uses Suhr pickups).

During their first years the company built high-end guitars to customer specifications, introducing a new model about once a year.

In 2004 they expanded into guitar amplifiers when they re-introduced the CAA OD-100, which had earlier only been available in very limited numbers. In addition to the OD-100, which still bears the Custom Audio Amplifiers brand, they now also manufacture the Badger line of amplifiers bearing the Suhr name. 2005 saw the introduction of the Silent Single Coil system, which uses a secondary coil for noise cancellation to enable guitars with single coil pickups to function without picking up noise. Later years have also seen introduction of various other electronic accessories like single-coil, humbucker and electric bass pickups, mixers, and now also effect pedals. This included a collaboration with Doug Aldrich to create high-output humbucking pickups for an aggressive rock style of playing. In addition to receiving attention for their instruments, the company has also received some attention for their usage of modern technology in the design and manufacturing process in what might be regarded as a hand-craft niche of the guitar industry.

At the 2010 winter NAMM Show, the company introduced a new line of guitars with a new brand, Rasmus Guitars. These guitars were manufactured in Asia but had the final setup performed at the Suhr factory in Lake Elsinore, California. Moving production to Asia enabled the company to lower costs, and these guitars were therefore priced a tier below the Suhr Pro line. The Rasmus line was discontinued in 2012 with the introduction of the Modern Satin series, fully made in Lake Elsinore but with a simple and standardized finish. The Modern Satin initially had ordinary nickel frets, receiving jumbo stainless steel frets since April 2013.

== Products ==
=== Electric guitars ===
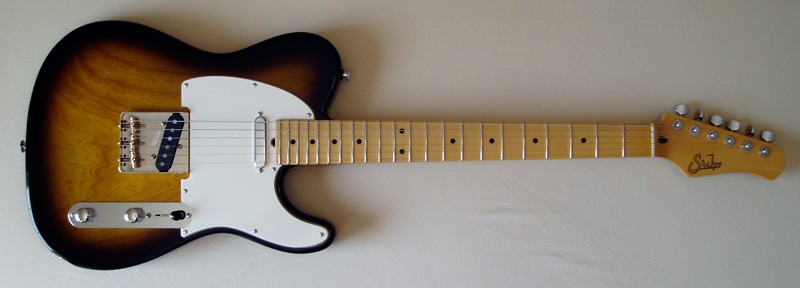
A tobacco sunburst Suhr Classic T with a maple neck featuring their optional hybrid headstock

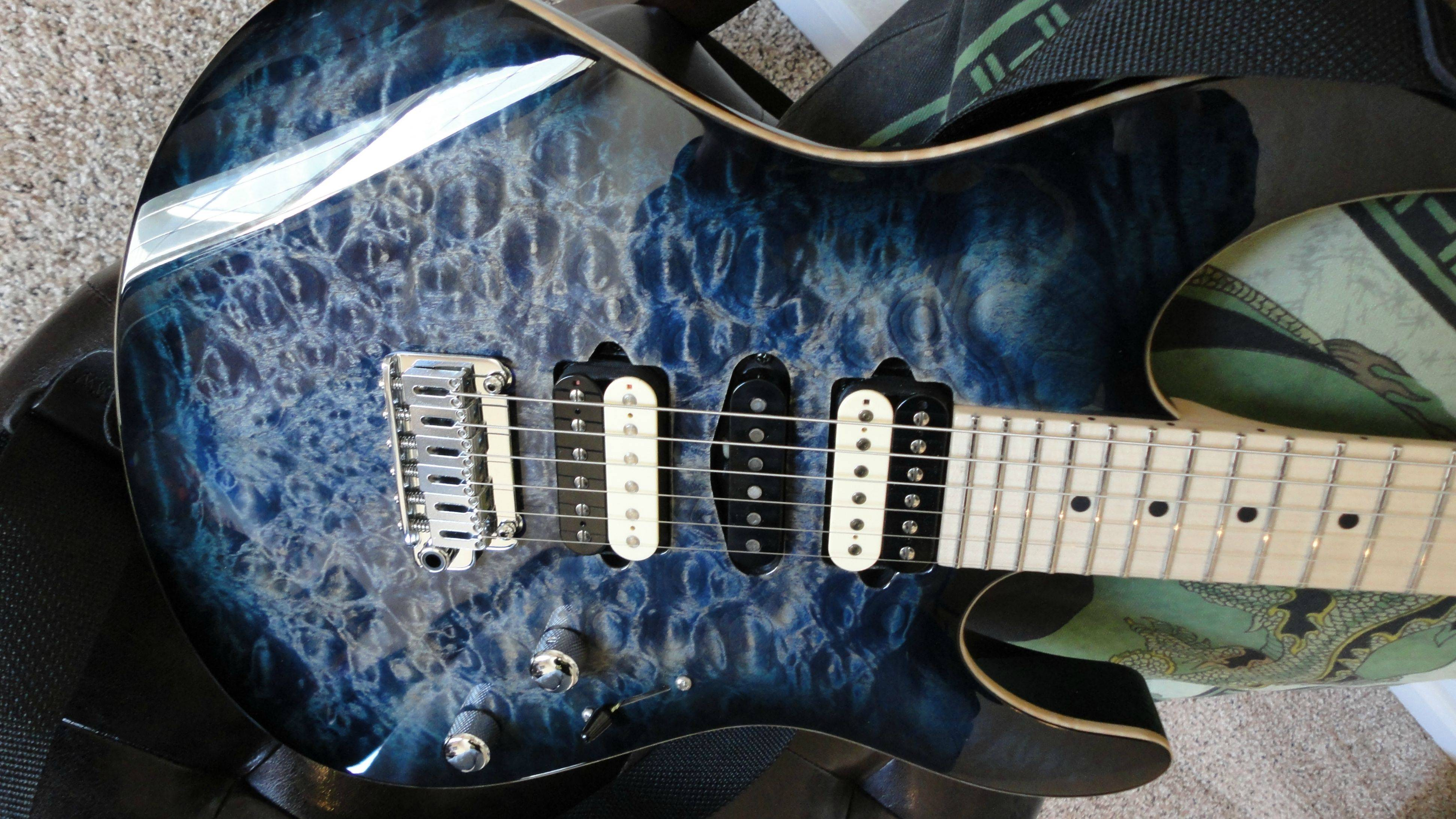
Suhr Modern, whale blue maple top

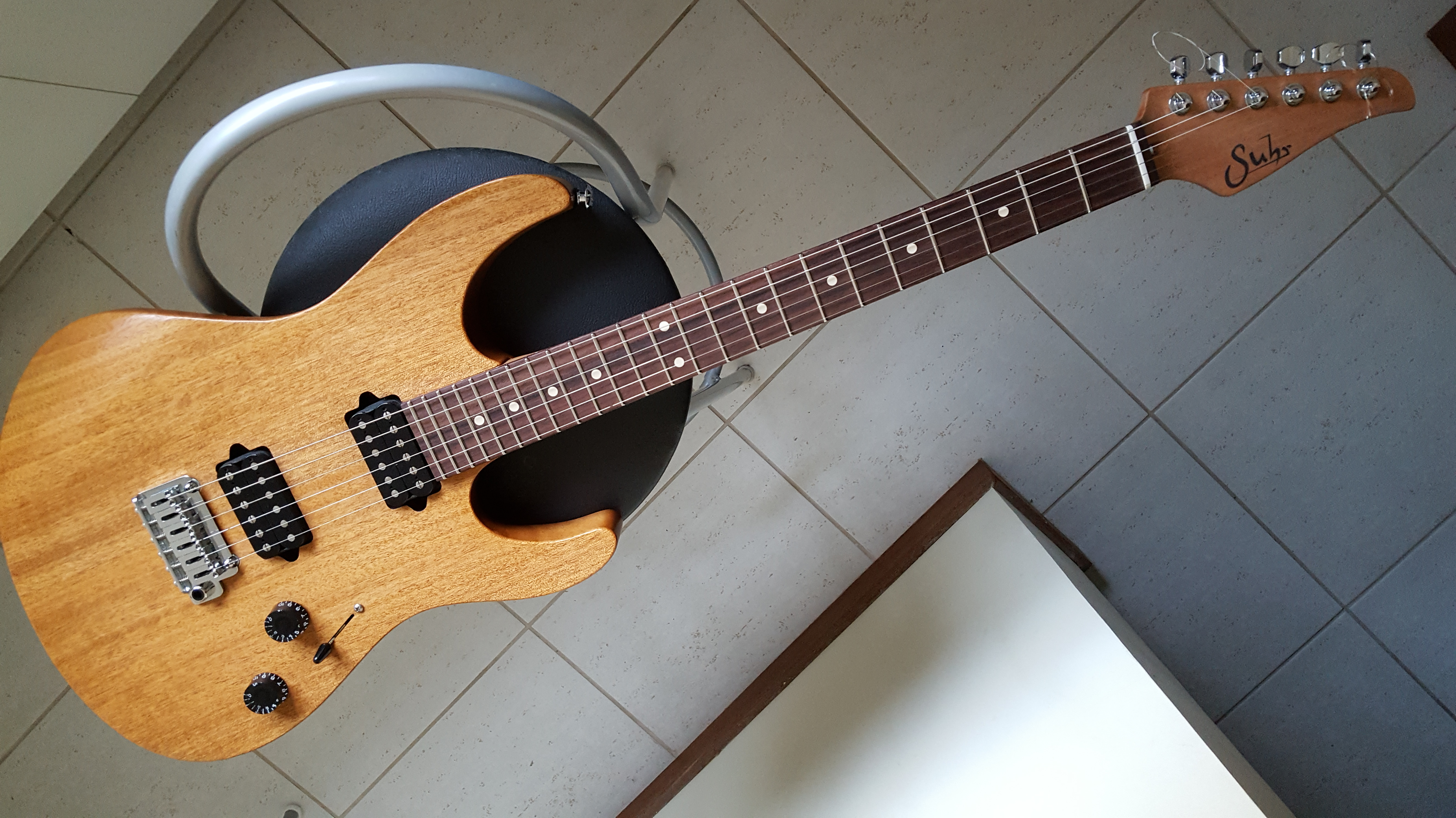
Suhr Modern Satin, natural finish

Their guitar models are based on the below mentioned five distinct body shapes, and different series are available. All guitars are built to customer specifications, with the exception of the Pro Series, which are a limited option series of guitars based on the five available body shapes.

- Classic (based on Fender Stratocaster)
- Classic T (based on Fender Telecaster)
- Classic JM (based on Fender Jazzmaster)
- Standard (loosely Stratocaster-shaped with additional Superstrat styling including a carve top)
- Modern (24-fret Superstrat)
- Modern T (24-fret similar to the Modern but with a Telecaster-inspired body)
- Aura (based on Gibson Les Paul)

=== Bass guitars ===
- Classic J (based on Fender Jazz Bass)
- Classic P (based on Fender Precision Bass)

=== Amplifiers ===
- Badger 18
- Badger 30
- Badger 35
- OD-100
- PT-100
- SH-100
- ML-100
- SE-100
- SL-67
- SL-68
- Corso
- Hedgehog
- Bella/Bella Reverb
- Hombre
- Jim Kelley Amplifiers

=== Effects pedals ===
- Jack Rabbit Tremolo
- Koji Comp
- Riot/Riot Reloaded
- Shiba Drive/Shiba Drive Reloaded
- KokoBoost/KokoBoost Reloaded
- Rufus/Rufus Reloaded
- Dual Boost
- Eclipse
- ACE Analog Cabinet Emulator
- Discovery Analog Delay
- Alexa Analog Chorus (Discontinued)

== Artists ==
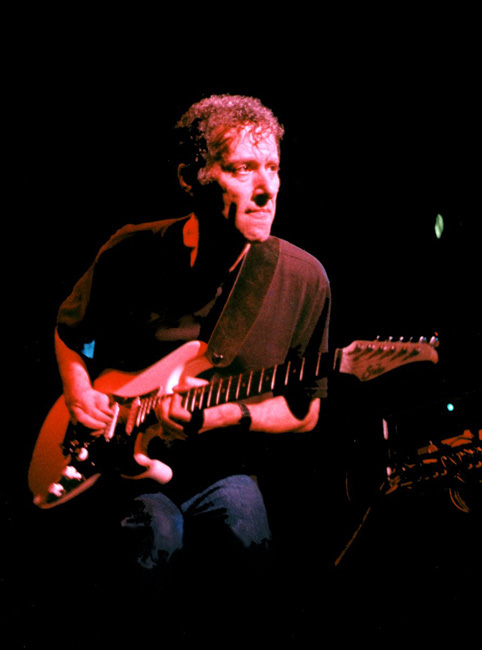
Scott Henderson in 2007

Musicians who use/have used Suhr guitars and basses are:

- Reb Beach
- Scott Henderson
- Guthrie Govan (until mid-2012)
- Mike Landau
- Ian Thornley
- Dave Kilminster
- Ben Harper
- Mateus Asato
- Mark Knopfler
- Pino Daniele
- Federico Renzulli Litfiba
- Ariel Posen
