= Ground lift plug =

A ground lift plug may refer to:

- A cheater plug which interrupts the ground or earth connection in a power connection.
- A ground lift device used for professional audio systems and electronic instrumentation to eliminate ground loop inconveniences and establish connection when only a two prong receptacle is available.
