= Guitar speaker =

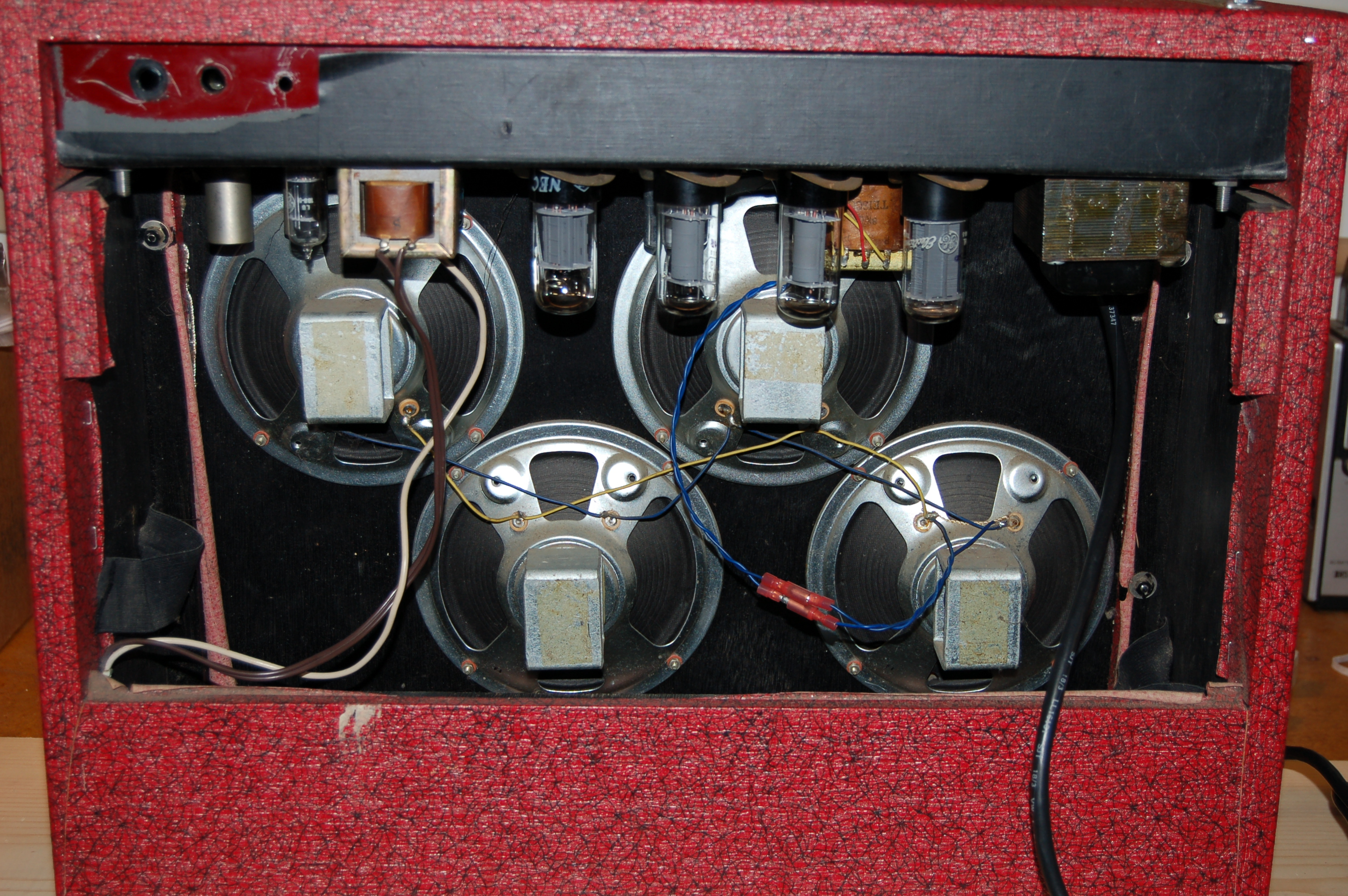
A rear view of an open-backed 1960s Teisco 74R combo amp, showing its four speakers.

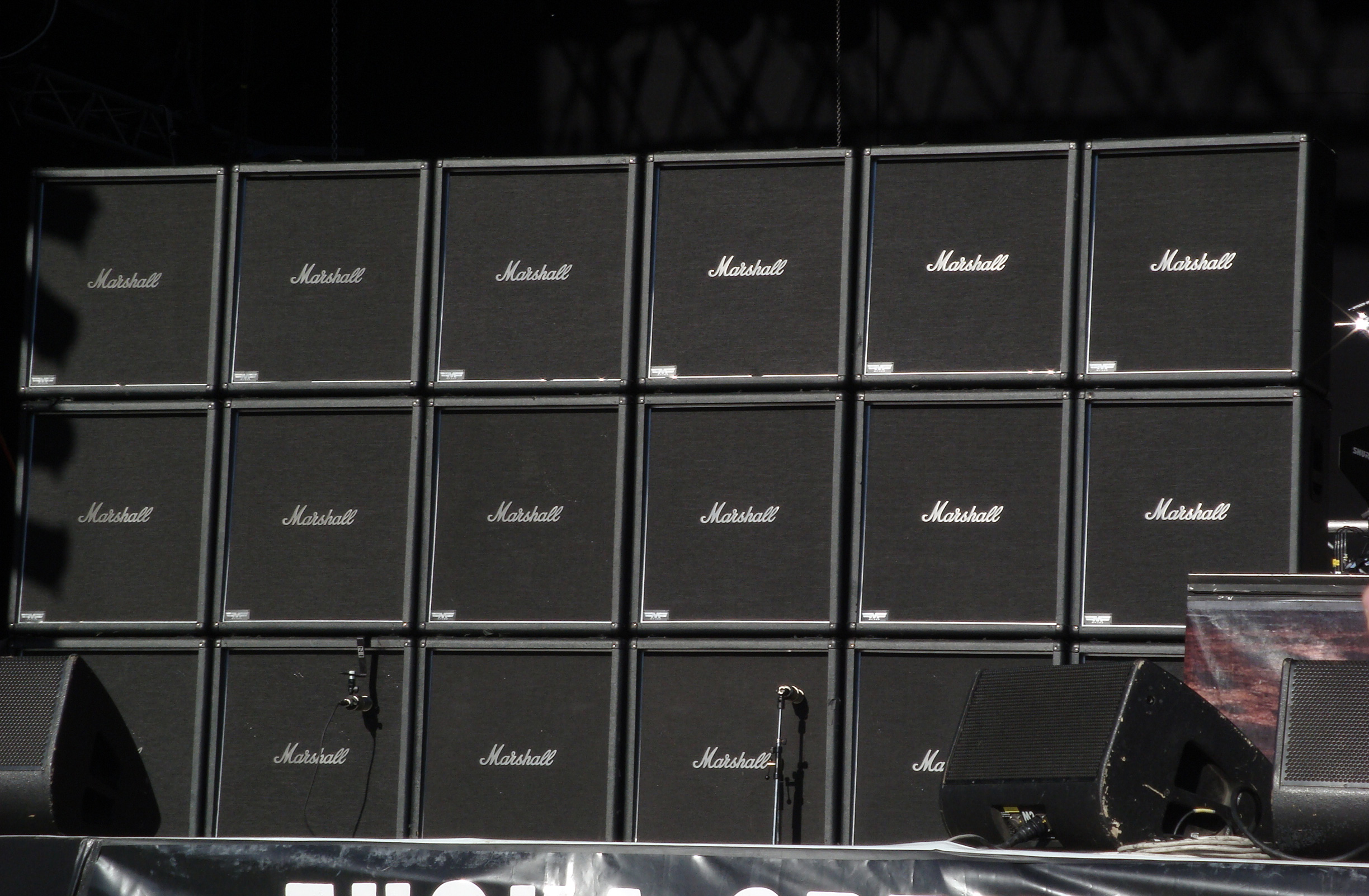
A 3 x 6 stack of Marshall Mode-Four guitar cabinets on the main stage of Tuska Open Air Metal Festival in 2008. This setup belonged to Jeff Hanneman of Slayer. The bottom row is active but the rest are dummies.

A guitar speaker is a loudspeaker – specifically the driver (transducer) part – designed for use in a combination guitar amplifier (in which a loudspeaker and an amplifier are installed in a wooden cabinet) of an electric guitar, or for use in a guitar speaker cabinet. Typically these drivers produce only the frequency range relevant to electric guitars, which is similar to a regular woofer type driver, which is approximately 75 Hz — 5 kHz, or for electric bass speakers, down to 41 Hz for regular four-string basses or down to about 30 Hz for five-string instruments.

The cones of these drivers typically range in size from 6.5 to 15 inches (170 to 380 mm) with 10 inches (250 mm) and 12 inches (300 mm) models being the most popular for electric guitar and electric bass combo amps and speaker cabinets. As with all loudspeaker drivers, the magnets are usually made from Alnico, ceramic, or, to reduce weight on more expensive models, neodymium. Higher quality Alnico magnets are reserved for more expensive models. Well-known guitar speaker manufacturers include Jensen, Celestion, Eminence, Electro-Voice, JBL, Peavey, and Vox. Small practice amps often have 6.5 or 8 speakers. Combination (or "combo") amplifier cabinets often have one or more 10 and 12 speakers. The largest speaker "stacks", used in stadium concerts, have eight 10 or 12 in speakers. Bass amplifier speaker cabinets for the bass guitar also often use one or more 10 or 12 in speakers (both 2x10 in and 4x10 in cabinets are popular; in addition, bass cabinets are more likely than electric guitar cabinets to use 15 in speakers.

Guitar speakers are designed differently from hi-fi speakers intended for in-home listening to pre-recorded music. Whereas hi-fi speakers are meant to provide as little coloration of the source signal as possible, guitar speakers are often designed to add some type of tonal coloration to the sound.

== Cabinet ==
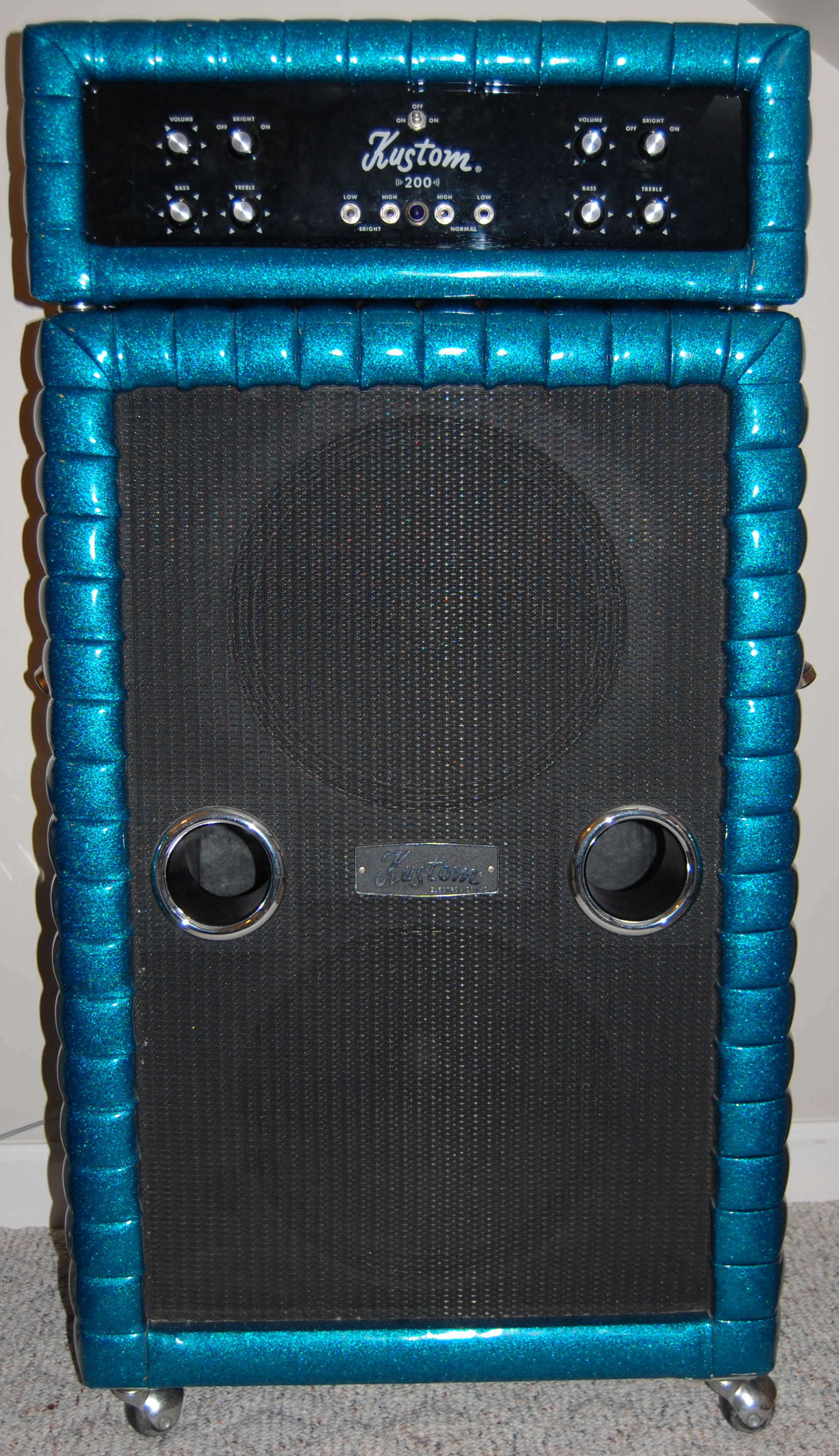
Kustom 200 bass amp – amp head and speakers, 100 watts RMS, two channels, on top of a speaker cabinet with two 15" speakers, 1971

A guitar speaker cabinet is typically a wooden box that contains one or more guitar speakers. The smallest guitar cabinets have one 6.5" or 8" speaker; these are usually practice amplifier units designed for private practice. Some cabinets designed for rehearsals and small- to mid-size venues contain two 10" or 12" speakers. Another popular format is four 10" or four 12" speakers. Some performers use two 4x10" or 4x12" cabinets. The largest guitar speaker cabinets have eight 10" or 12" speakers. A 4x12" ("four by twelve") is a guitar speaker cabinet containing four 12" speakers. Less commonly, some bass amp cabinets have multiple 8" speakers (e.g., the 8x8" cabinet).

Cabinets with mixed-size speakers are less common, but they are used (e.g., a bass amplifier cabinet with a 15" loudspeaker for lower frequencies and a smaller speaker for mid- to high-range frequencies. A cabinet is usually mono, but may have two inputs for a "stereo" amplifier. Two speakers in a cabinet may be wired in parallel (lowering the impedance) or in series (increasing the impedance). Larger multiples will usually be series/parallel to maintain an impedance of 4 to 8 ohms.

Many cabinets contain parallel input/outputs on the rear panel, so that one speaker cab can be plugged into the amp head, and then a second cabinet can be plugged into the first cabinet; as this "daisy-chaining" approach is wired in parallel, plugging in a second cabinet lowers the impedance seen by the amplifier. Cabinets typically have an impedance rating printed on the rear panel, such as "8 ohm minimum" or "4 ohms minimum". These warnings mean that the user should not connect an amplifier requiring a higher impedance; tube amps in particular are designed to work with speakers having some particular impedance. Since speaker impedances as seen by the amplifier vary with frequency, with voice coil construction, and with the cabinet's acoustical loading (which also varies with frequency) there can be no exact match under all conditions. When users daisy-chain a second cabinet with paralleled speakers, they must ensure the amplifier can handle the lower impedance it will see.

Bass guitar cabinets may include a single speaker (typically 12" or 15"), multiple speakers of the same type (common formats include 2x10", 4x10" and 8x10"). Some bass cabinets use multiple different-sized speakers, such as a mixture of 12" and 15" speakers. In rare cases, some large bass cabinets (known as "bass bins") incorporate folded horns to boost the bass response. Bass amp cabinets may have a horn or tweeter built into a speaker cabinet which contains one or more woofer drivers. When a cabinet includes such a horn, the enclosure may also have an attenuator knob, for turning the horn volume up or down. Some more expensive bass cabinets with a woofer/horn approach may have additional features, such as circuitry to protect the speakers or horn from overloads or a bi-amplification option.

Bi-amplification enables a bassist to use a crossover circuit to split their bass signal into two: a low frequency signal and a high frequency signal, and then route the low and high frequencies into two power amplifiers, each of which send their powered signal to different speaker enclosures. One power amp (usually of higher power) handles the low frequencies, which are sent the larger drivers (at lower frequencies), and a less powerful amp amplifies the high frequencies, which are sent to the horn. For bass players seeking a pure, transparent sound, biamplification may produce a "cleaner" sound. For bass players in hard rock or heavy metal who are using an overdriven sound, biamplification may be safer for the horn or tweeter; while a clipped, distorted signal can be handled by a heavy-duty woofer, the same clipped signal will come much closer to damaging a horn driver or a tweeter. Biamping allows a bassist to have the "dirty" overdriven sound through their woofer(s) while keeping the signal sent to the horn clean, thus protecting the horn. At the high onstage volume levels used in large rock and metal concerts, a powerful, overdriven bass signal poses a higher risk of horn damage in non-biamped systems.

Often what is referred to as a "guitar amp" is in fact a combo amplifier: a cabinet with speakers and a built-in amplifier. Combo amplifiers may be referred to by their speaker cabinet configuration plus the word "combo", so that "4x10 combo" means a guitar amplifier built into a 4x10" speaker cabinet. Since the popular configurations are limited in variety, cabinet configurations are often written abbreviated without ambiguity: For example, 4x10" may be written 410, and 112 refers to a single cabinet housing a 12" speaker.

The speaker cabinets, which hold these drivers can be closed-back or open-back, along with variations such as a semi-open back 4x12 in cabinet, which may have a baffle deflecting two of the four speakers. Closed back cabinets may be acoustic suspension or bass reflex. Bass cabinets are usually closed-back or use a bass reflex port or vent to boost low frequency response. The purpose of the cabinet is match the acoustic impedance seen by the driver to the driver's own electrical/mechanical impedance. Cabinets are best used when they are matched to the driver(s) being used; casual substitution of another driver which can be mounted in a cabinet will only accidentally make changes in a beneficial direction.

The sound of the speaker and cabinet is crucial to the sound of the electric guitar, so much so that it needs to be considered part of the instrument's tone. If the clean signal from a guitar amplifier or pre-amplifier is captured directly (i.e., before it is sent to a speaker cabinet) it will very often be rather brittle and thin, with no "resonant" depth, particularly if the guitar signal is from a string pickup (i.e., the type used in a solid-body electric guitar). Vibration pickups, or microphone pickups, as used in many hollow body electro-acoustic guitars, aren't as strongly affected. The result can sound excessively shrill, scratchy and fizzy, completely different from the smooth tones that listeners hear in recordings or live performances.

When driven hard, guitar speakers produce complex behavior, which affects the sound of the instrument. There will be some power compression, several kinds of distortion, even mechanical limiting as one or more drivers approach their physical limits (e.g. cone excursion). A guitar speaker shows a nonlinear frequency response depending on the speaker's load, e.g. the frequency response, and various distortions, at small amplitudes is different from those at large amplitudes.

=== Isolation cabinets and emulation devices ===
A guitar speaker isolation cabinet contains a guitar speaker and one or two microphones in a single- or double-layer soundproofed box. These devices allow the capture of the sound of a guitar amplifier and speaker being played at high levels, while minimizing "bleed through" between tracks in the mix. These are almost exclusively used in recording studios and during live performances being recorded.

As an alternative to the isolation cabinet, there are guitar speaker cabinet emulating circuits or signal processors (also known as direct boxes or preamplifier-DI boxes), allowing the sound of a guitar amplifier to be fed directly into a PA system or recording equipment without the need for a speaker cabinet and microphone. Direct boxes are generally used more often with electric bass than with electric guitar, because the tone of a guitar amplifier and speaker is often considered to be a key element of an electric guitarist's tone. While DI boxes are used to route an electric bass signal to a mixing board, the audio engineer also often uses a mic set up in front of the bassist's speaker enclosure, to capture the bass player's preamped, equalized signal from the speaker cabinet. The engineer can then use either the DI out signal or the miked cabinet in the live or recording mix, or use a blend of the DI signal and the miked cabinet signal.

Digital cabinet emulation is the treatment of a signal with the simulation of the sound of a speaker and a cabinet. It is available in software, "stompbox" pedals, and in some guitar amps with a "cabinet modeling" feature. Cabinet emulation is complex, but at its core it is the use of digital equalization which, combined with resonance models that reproduce the frequency response of the mounted speaker as well as the internal reflections and standing waves of the cabinet. Cabinet emulators typically offer the user a range of commonly used presets (e.g., different sizes of speaker cabinet, from small combo amps to large 8x10" "stacks" and different types or styles of speaker or cabinet, for traditional, blues, metal and other genres). Some cabinet emulator systems also allow the user to select the type of miking or the position of the microphones (e.g., front miking, rear miking, etc.). There is debate about how successful this level of emulation is or can be from a musical perspective. Technically, with enough funding and effort, it is possible to emulate a particular speaker/cabinet combination, but so many factors also affect the sound (eg, the room in which the speaker/cabinet is being used, the amplifier driving it, ...) that musical success for a particular observer may be justly debated.

== See also ==
- Isolation cabinet (guitar)
- Guitar amplifier
- Instrument amplifier
- Loudspeaker
- Bass instrument amplification
- Electric guitar
- Re-amp
- Mult box
