= Legging =

Legging may refer to:

- Legging, a low tackle in Australian rules football
- Leggings, a type of clothing
- Legging (canals), a means of propelling boats through canal tunnels
- Blacklegging, in labor striking
- Dead-legging, performing a peroneal strike on someone
- Ferret-legging, a sport where a ferret is trapped in a pant leg while worn

== See also ==
- Bootlegging (disambiguation)
- Leg (disambiguation)
