= Direct injection =

Direct injection may refer to:

- A music recording technique more commonly referred to as DI unit § Purpose
- Direct fuel injection, a method of fuel injection for an internal combustion engine
  - Direct injection diesel
  - Gasoline direct injection
- Direct injection trajectory, a method of launching a spacecraft toward the Moon or interplanetary space without a temporary stay in a parking orbit
