= Bootleg =

Bootleg, bootlegging or bootlegger(s) may refer to:

== Common meanings ==
- Rum-running, the illegal business of transporting and trading in alcoholic beverages
- Moonshine, illicitly made and/or distributed alcohol
- Counterfeit, a fake or unauthorized replica of a genuine product
- Fan recording, unauthorized circulation of unpublished work of artists

== Apparel ==
- Bootleg trousers, a kind of bell-bottomed trousers
- Bootleg, a brand name used by C. & J. Clark for children's shoes and trainers

== Arts, entertainment, and media ==
=== Film and television ===
- Bootleg (TV series), a 2002 miniseries for children
- Bootleggers (1969 film), an Italian-Spanish crime-action film
- Bootleggers (1974 film), an American crime film
- Bootleg (1985 film), a 1985 Australian film
- Bootlegger (2021 film), a 2021 Canadian film

=== Music ===
- Bootleg recording, an audio or video recording released unofficially
- Bootleg (Downchild Blues Band album), 1971
- Bootleg (Kenshi Yonezu album), 2017
- Bootleg (Larry Norman album), 1972
- Bootleg (Tempest album), 1991
- "Bootleg" (Creedence Clearwater Revival song), 1969
- "Bootleg", another term for a mashup
- Bootleg, a 2004 album by Avenue D
- Bootleg, a 1988 album by Bad News
- Bootleg, a 2007 album by Eric's Trip
- Bootlegs, a 2000 album by Kristy Thirsk
- "Boot-Leg", a song by Booker T & the MG's

=== Other media ===
- Bootleg games, a term given to various video games and consoles produced and released outside of traditional means
- Bootleg radio, also known as pirate radio
- Bootleg, a superheroine in the comic book New Men
- The Bootleggers, a 1961 non-fiction book by Kenneth Allsop

== Other uses ==
- Bootlegging (research and development), practicing unauthorized research activities within an organization
- Bootleg Fire, a 2021 Oregon wildfire
- Bootleg mining, a mining practice involving small, illegal mines
- Bootleg play, a tactic in American football
- Bootleg turn, a driving maneuver
- Bootleg ground, a connection in building wiring
- Bootleg, the upper part (or shaft) of a boot

== See also ==
- "Bootleggers and Baptists", an economic theory that ostensibly opposing groups will often support similar legal restrictions on trade
- Live Bootleg (disambiguation)
