= Phantom power =

DC power through microphone cables

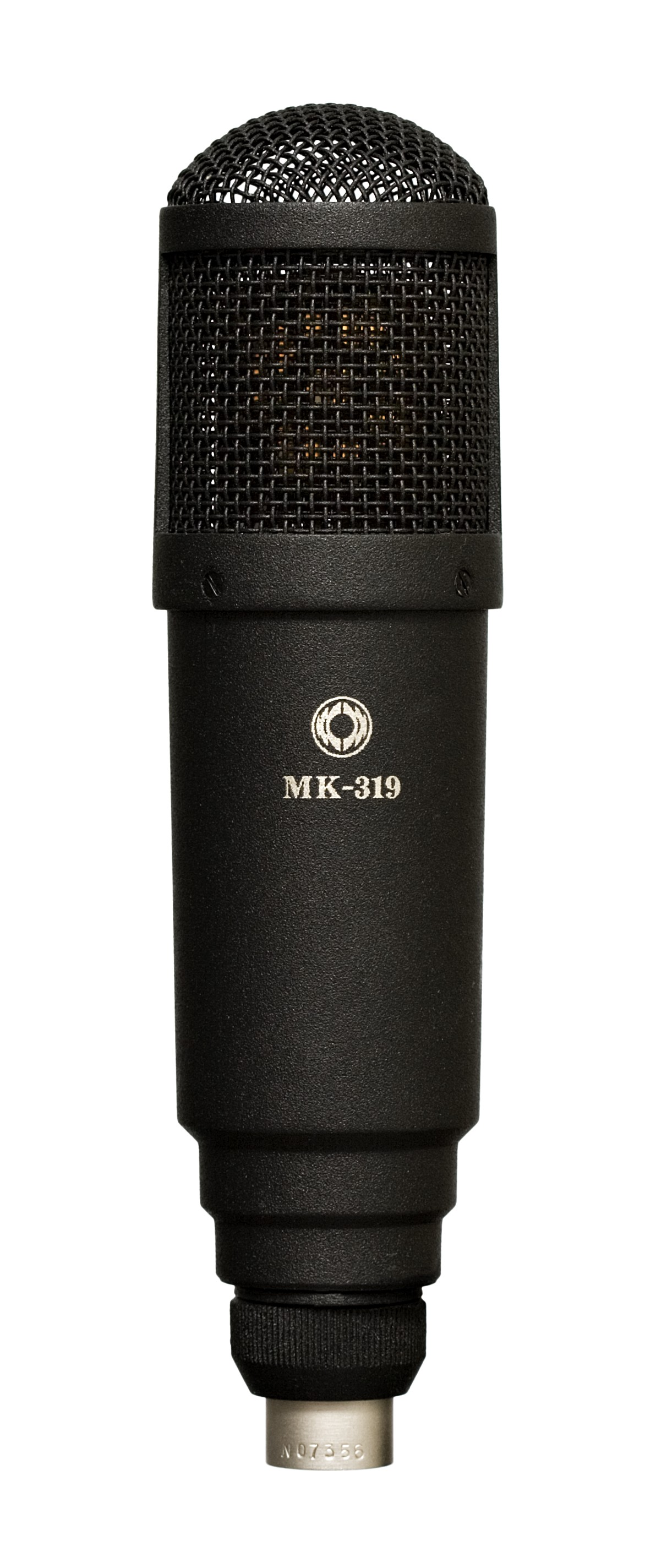
A condenser microphone requires power to produce a DC polarizing voltage and to power an internal amplifier required to drive long cables

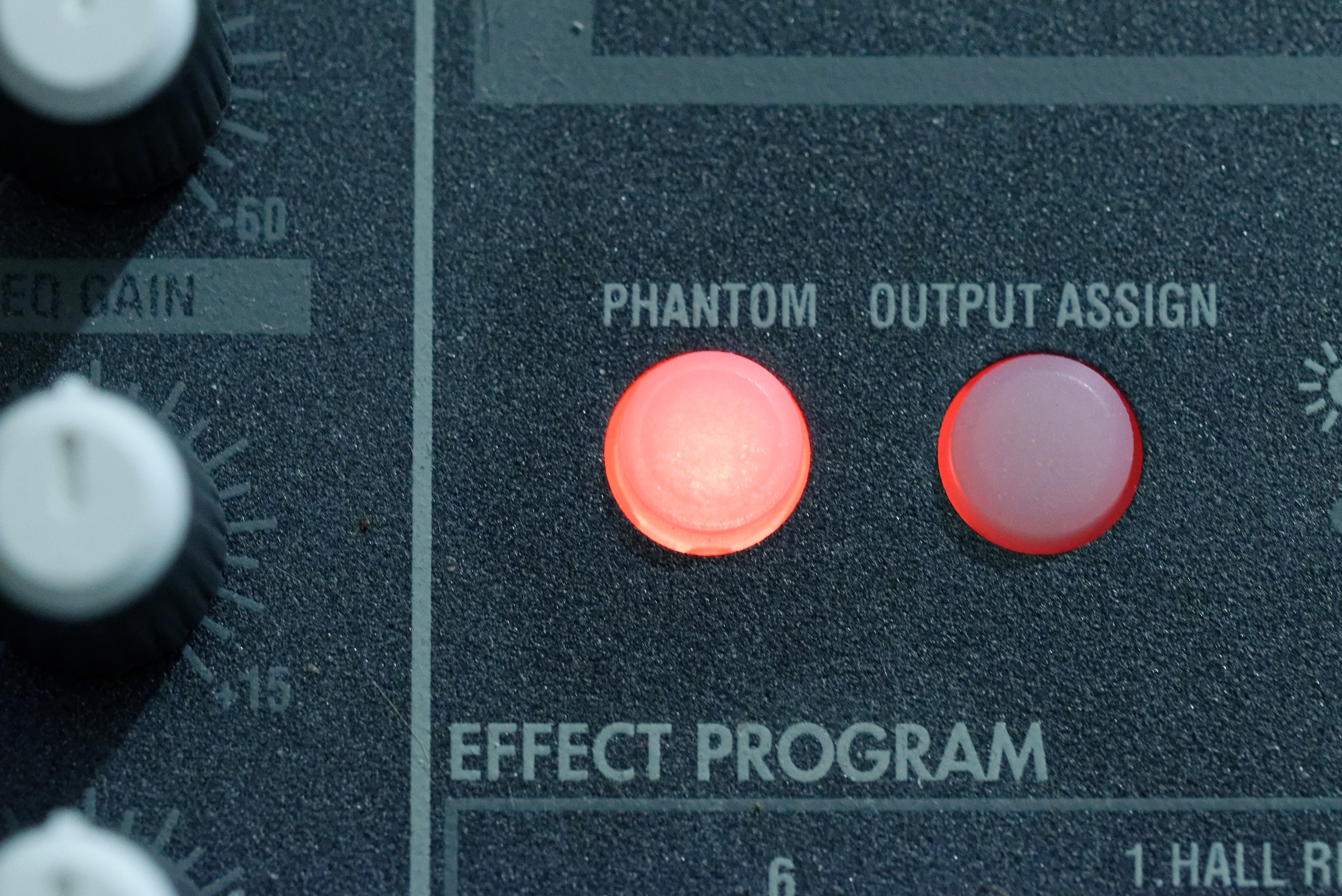
Phantom power button and indicator light

Phantom power, in the context of professional audio equipment, is direct current (DC) electric power equally applied to both signal wires in balanced microphone cables, forming a phantom circuit, to power microphones that contain active electronic circuitry. It is best known as a convenient power source for condenser microphones, though many active direct boxes also use it. The technique is also used in other applications where power supply and signal communication take place over the same wires.

Phantom power supplies are often built into mixing consoles, microphone preamplifiers and similar equipment. In addition to powering the circuitry of a microphone, traditional condenser microphones also use phantom power for polarizing the microphone's transducer element.

== History ==
Phantom powering was first used for copper wire-based telephone landlines since the introduction of the rotary dial telephone in 1919. One such application in the telephone system was to provide a DC signalling path around transformer-connected amplifiers such as analogue line transmission systems.

The first known commercially available phantom-powered microphone was the Schoeps model CMT 20, which came out in 1964, built to the specifications of French radio with 9–12 volt DC phantom power; the positive pole of this powering was grounded. Microphone preamplifiers of the Nagra IV-series tape recorders offered this type of powering as an option for many years and Schoeps continued to support "negative phantom" until the CMT series was discontinued in the mid-1970s, but it is obsolete now.

In 1966, Neumann GmbH presented a new type of transistorized microphone to the Norwegian Broadcasting Corporation, NRK. Norwegian Radio had requested phantom-powered operation. Since NRK already had 48-volt power available in their studios for their emergency lighting systems, this voltage was used for powering the new microphones (model KM 84), and is the origin of 48-volt phantom power. This arrangement was later standardized in DIN 45596.

== Standards ==
The International Electrotechnical Commission's "Multimedia systems – Guide to the recommended characteristics of analogue interfaces to achieve interoperability" (IEC 61938:2018) specifies parameters for microphone phantom power delivery. Three variants are defined by the document: P12, P24 and P48. In addition, two additional variants (P12L and SP48) are mentioned for specialized applications. Most microphones now use the P48 standard (maximum available power is 240 mW). Although 12- and 24-volt systems are still in use, the current standard recommends a 48-volt supply for new systems. While an earlier revision suggested 24 volt, it was never widely adopted.

== Technical information ==
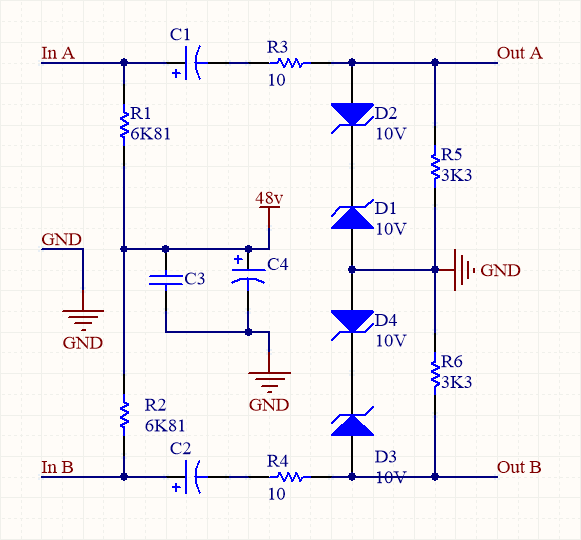
One method of supplying phantom power. A microphone or other device can obtain DC power from either signal line to the ground terminal, and two capacitors block this DC from appearing at the output. R1 and R2 should be 6.81 kΩ for P48 48-volt phantom. R3–6 and Zener diodes 1–4 deliberately clip the outputs to ±10 V to protect a subsequent circuit from potentially large transients.

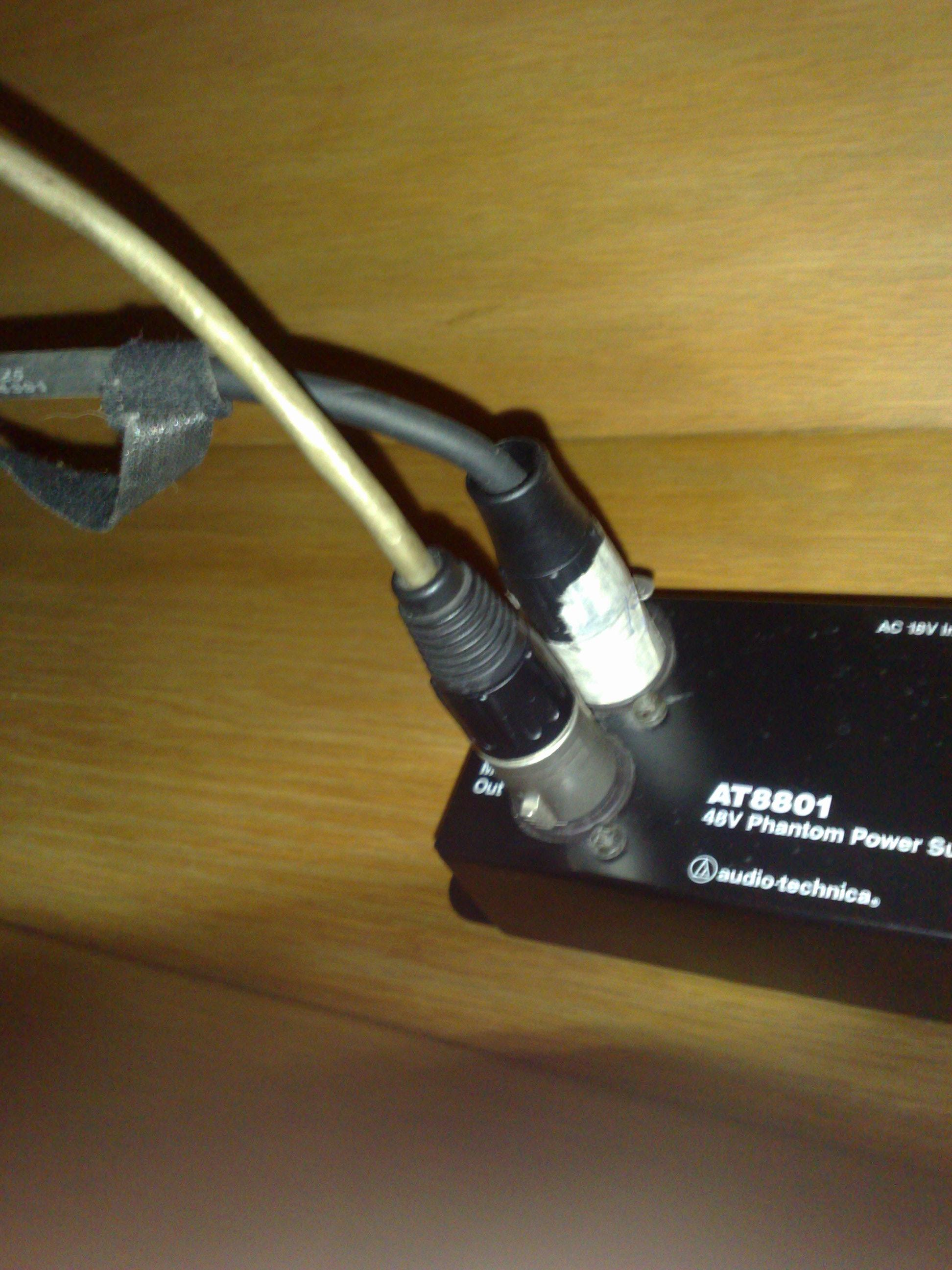
An external phantom power supply.

Phantom powering consists of a phantom circuit where direct current is applied equally through the two signal lines of a balanced audio connector (in modern equipment, both pins 2 and 3 of an XLR connector). The supply voltage is referenced to the ground pin of the connector (pin 1 of an XLR), which normally is connected to the cable shield or a ground wire in the cable or both. When phantom powering was introduced, one of its advantages was that the same type of balanced, shielded microphone cable that studios were already using for dynamic microphones could be used for condenser microphones. This is in contrast to microphones with vacuum-tube circuitry, most of which require special, multi-conductor cables. (Note: There are phantom-powered vacuum tube microphones, such as the Microtech Gefell UM900 and Audio-Technica AT3060.)

With phantom power, the supply voltage is effectively invisible to balanced microphones that do not use it, which includes most dynamic microphones. A balanced signal consists only of the differences in voltage between two signal lines; phantom powering places the same DC voltage on both signal lines of a balanced connection. This is in marked contrast to another, slightly earlier method of powering known as "parallel powering" or "T-powering" (from the German term Tonaderspeisung), in which DC was overlaid directly onto the signal in differential mode. Connecting a conventional microphone to an input that had parallel powering enabled could very well damage the microphone.

The IEC 61938 Standard defines 48-volt, 24-volt, and 12-volt phantom powering. The signal conductors are positive, both fed through resistors of equal value (6.81 kΩ for 48 V, 1.2 kΩ for 24 V, and 680 Ω for 12 V), and the shield is ground. The 6.81 kΩ value is not critical, but the resistors must be matched to within 0.1% or better to maintain good common-mode rejection in the circuit. The 24-volt version of phantom powering, proposed quite a few years after the 12 and 48 V versions, was also included in the DIN standard and is in the IEC standard, but it was never widely adopted by equipment manufacturers.

Nearly all modern mixing consoles have a switch for turning phantom power on or off; in most high-end equipment, this can be done individually by channel, while on smaller mixers, a single master switch may control power delivery to all channels. Phantom power can be blocked in any channel with a 1:1 isolation transformer or blocking capacitors. Phantom powering can cause equipment malfunction or even damage if used with cables or adapters that connect one side of the input to ground, or if certain equipment other than microphones is connected to it.

Instrument amplifiers rarely provide phantom power. To use equipment requiring it with these amplifiers, a separate power supply must be inserted into the line. These are readily available commercially, or alternatively, are one of the easier projects for the amateur electronics constructor.

== Caveats ==
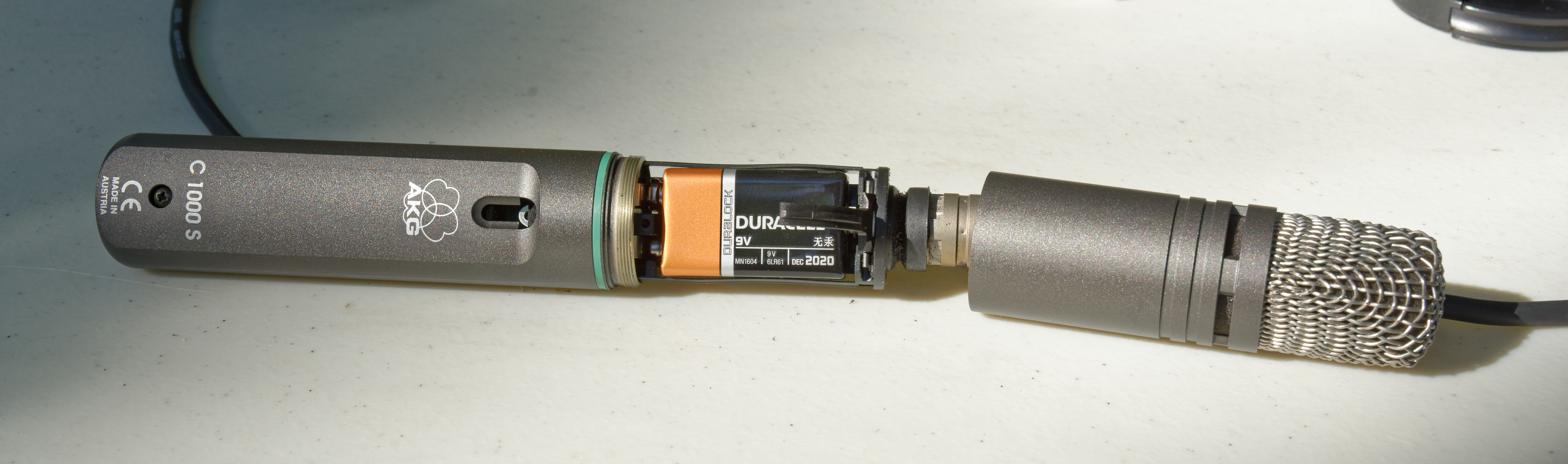
AKG C1000S, uses phantom power or a battery

Some microphones offer a choice of internal battery powering or (external) phantom powering. In some such microphones, it is advisable to remove the internal batteries when phantom power is being used since batteries may corrode and leak chemicals. Other microphones are specifically designed to switch over to the internal batteries if an external supply fails.

Phantom powering is not always implemented correctly or adequately, even in professional-quality preamps, mixers, and recorders. In part, this is because first-generation (late-1960s through mid-1970s) 48-volt phantom-powered condenser microphones had simple circuitry and required only small amounts of operating current (typically less than 1 mA per microphone), so the phantom supply circuits typically built into recorders, mixers, and preamps of that time were designed on the assumption that this current would be adequate. The original DIN 45596 phantom-power specification called for a maximum of 2 mA. This practice has carried forward to the present; many 48-volt phantom power supply circuits, especially in low-cost and portable equipment, simply cannot supply more than 1 or 2 mA total without breaking down. Some circuits also have significant additional resistance in series with the standard pair of supply resistors for each microphone input; this may not affect low-current microphones much, but it can disable microphones that need more current.

Mid-1970s and later condenser microphones designed for 48-volt phantom powering often require much more current (e.g., 2–4 mA for Neumann transformerless microphones, 4–5 mA for the Schoeps CMC ("Colette") series and Josephson microphones, 5–6 mA for most Shure KSM-series microphones, 8 mA for CAD Equiteks and 10 mA for Earthworks). The IEC standard gives 10 mA as the maximum allowed current per microphone. If the required current is not available, a microphone may still put out a signal, but it cannot deliver its intended level of performance. The specific symptoms vary somewhat, but the most common result will be a reduction of the maximum sound pressure level that the microphone can handle without overload (distortion). Some microphones will also show lower sensitivity (output level for a given sound-pressure level).

Most ground lift switches have the unwanted effect of disconnecting phantom power. There must always be a DC current path between pin 1 of the microphone and the negative side of the 48-volt supply if power is to reach the microphone's electronics. Lifting the ground, which is normally pin 1, breaks this path and disables the phantom power supply.

There is a common belief that connecting a dynamic or ribbon microphone to a phantom-powered input will damage it. There are three possibilities for this damage to occur. If there is a fault in the cable, phantom power may damage some mics by applying a voltage across the output of the microphone. Equipment damage is also possible if a phantom-powered input connected to an unbalanced dynamic microphone or electronic musical instruments. The transient generated when a microphone is hot-plugged into an input with active phantom power can damage the microphone and possibly the preamp circuit of the input because not all pins of the microphone connector make contact at the same time, and there is an instant when current can flow to charge the capacitance of the cable from one side of the phantom-powered input and not the other. This is particularly a problem with long microphone cables. It is considered good practice to disable phantom power to devices that don't require it.

== Digital phantom power ==
Digital microphones complying with the AES 42 standard may be provided with phantom power at 10 volts, impressed on both audio leads and ground. This supply can furnish up to 250 mA to digital microphones. A keyed variation of the usual XLR connector, the XLD connector, may be used to prevent accidental interchange of analog and digital devices.

== Other microphone powering techniques ==
T12 circuit example with ground-referenced supply

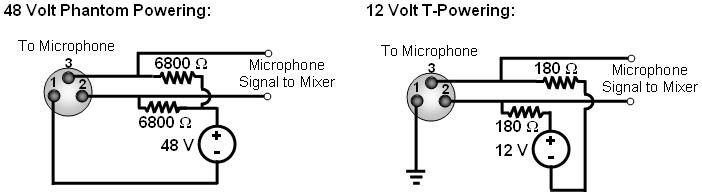
T12 T-power circuit with floating supply

T-power, also known as A-B powering or T12, described in DIN 45595, is an alternative to phantom powering that is still widely used in the world of production film sound. Many mixers and recorders intended for that market have a T-power option. The method is considered obsolete as power supply noise is added to the output audio signal. Many older Sennheiser and Schoeps microphones use this powering method, although newer recorders and mixers are phasing out this option. Adapter barrels and dedicated power supplies are made to accommodate T-powered microphones. In this scheme, 12 volts is applied through 180 ohm resistors between the microphone's "hot" terminal (XLR pin 2) and the microphone's "cold" terminal (XLR pin 3). This results in a 12-volt potential difference with significant current capability across pins 2 and 3, which would likely cause permanent damage if applied to a dynamic or ribbon microphone. The 12 volt supply may be floating or grounded.

Plug-in-power (PiP) is the low-current 3–5 V supply provided at the microphone jack of some consumer equipment, such as portable recorders and computer sound cards. It is also defined in IEC 61938. It is unlike phantom power since it is an unbalanced interface with a low voltage (around +5 volts) connected to the signal conductor with return through the sleeve; the DC power is in common with the audio signal from the microphone. A capacitor is used to block the DC from subsequent audio frequency circuits. It is often used for powering electret microphones, which will not function without power. It is suitable only for powering microphones specifically designed for use with this type of power supply. Damage may result if these microphones are connected to true (48 V) phantom power through a 3.5 mm to XLR adapter that connects the XLR shield to the 3.5 mm sleeve. Plug-in-power is covered by Japanese standard CP-1203A:2007.

These alternative powering schemes are sometimes improperly referred to as "phantom power" and should not be confused with true 48-volt phantom powering described above.

Some condenser microphones can be powered with a 1.5-volt cell contained in a small compartment in the microphone or in an external housing. Other voltages are also used; for example, the original Neumann U87 has provisions for two 22.5 volt batteries.

Phantom power is sometimes used by workers in avionics to describe the DC bias voltage used to power aviation microphones, which use a lower voltage than professional audio microphones. Phantom power used in this context is 8–16 volts DC in series with a 470 ohm (nominal) resistor as specified in RTCA Inc. standard DO-214. These microphones evolved from the carbon microphones used in the early days of aviation and the telephone, which relied on a DC bias voltage across the carbon microphone element.

== Other uses ==
Phantom power is also used in applications other than microphones:

- Active antennas
- Low-noise block downconverter
- Power over Ethernet

== See also ==
- Bias tee
- Power-line communication, data communication over mains electricity
- Simplex signaling
