= Earth return =

Earth return or ground return is an electric circuit using the earth for one conductor. It may refer to:

- Earth-return telegraph
- Single-wire earth return, an electric power distribution system
- Simplex signaling, an earth return signalling system used in telephony
