= 60 Hz =

60 Hz is a frequency that may refer to:

- the utility frequency (power line frequency) in the Americas and parts of Asia
- the frame rate of video broadcasts in the Americas and parts of Asia

== See also ==
- Interlaced video
- Mains hum
