= Three-prong adaptor =

Type of adapter

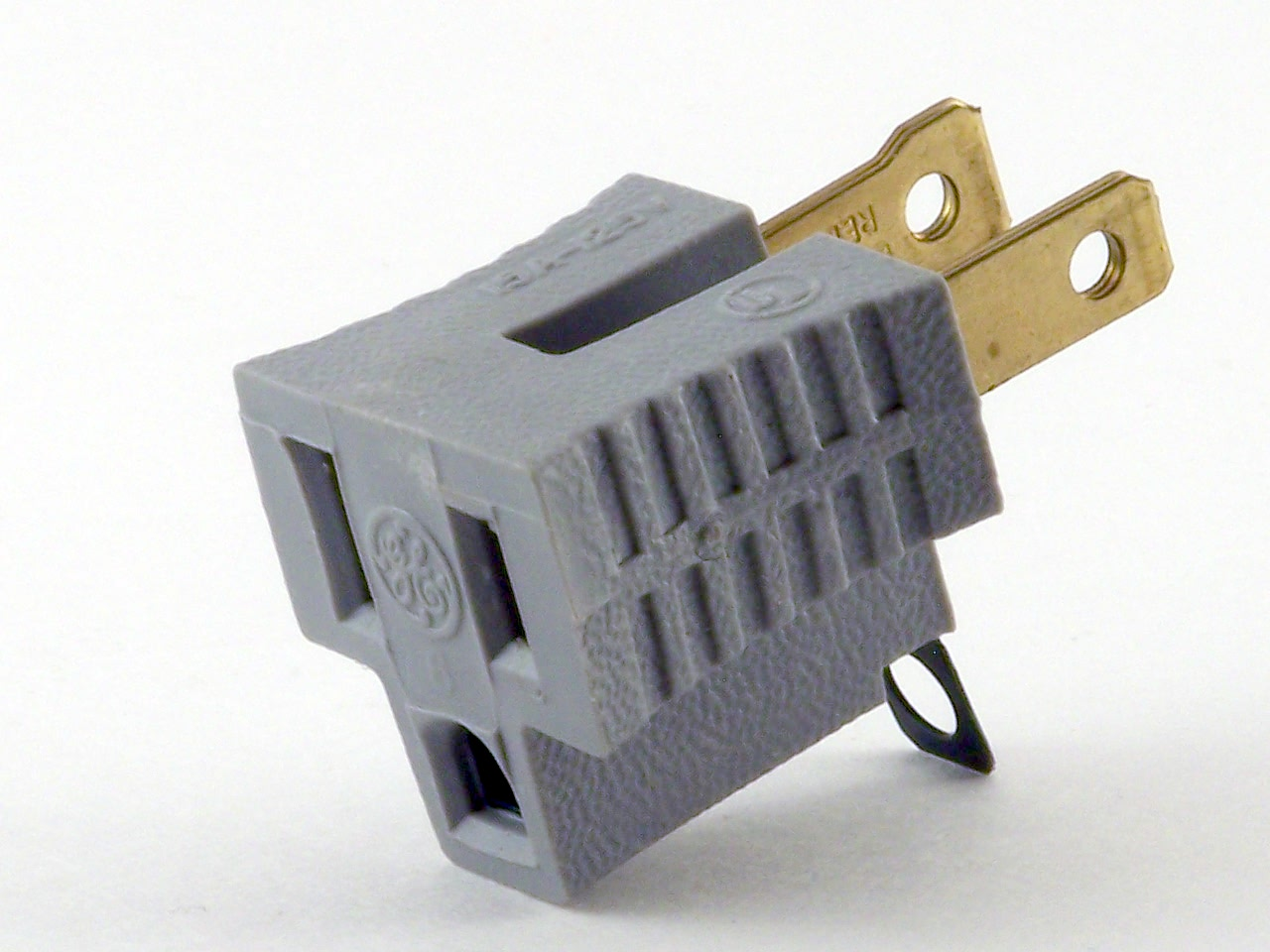
A cheater plug, with metal grounding tab (lower right). The ground tab is designed to be attached to the outlet faceplate screw, which is supposed to be connected to the building electrical ground.

A cheater plug, AC ground lifter or three-prong/two-prong adapter is an adapter that allows a NEMA 5-15P grounding-type plug (three prongs) to connect to a NEMA 1-15R non-grounding receptacle (two slots). They are needed to allow appliances with 3-wire power cords to plug into legacy ungrounded (two slot) receptacles found in older buildings. The use of such an adapter avoids the need to replace receptacles, but is potentially hazardous if the grounding tab is not connected to electrical ground. These adapters are illegal in some jurisdictions, in particular throughout Canada. A safer and more reliable alternative identified in the US and Canadian electrical codes is to replace the outlet with a Ground Fault Circuit Interrupter (GFCI) breaker outlet.

Cheater plugs are also used to break ground loops in audio systems. This practice has been condemned as disregarding electrical safety. A safer and more reliable alternative is to use an isolation transformer made specifically for this purpose.

== History ==
Cheater plugs were previously available with a short flexible grounding wire rather than a flat metal screw tab. This allowed use of the lower receptacle in a duplex outlet, which does not have a faceplate screw in the correct location for the screw tab. The grounding wire would be diverted around the adapter to reach the faceplate screw above it. However, this ground-wire style of cheater plug was discontinued when it was noted that a loose unattached grounding wire could accidentally become connected to the "hot" blade of a nearby outlet, potentially leading to electric shock. As an additional failure mode, the thin flexible wire could break unnoticed inside the insulation. Lastly, most of the early adaptors allowed accidental reversal of hot and neutral connections, because they lacked the widened neutral blade to enforce correct plug orientation.

Modern cheater plugs lack a flexible wire which could be accidentally misconnected. The flat parallel plug blades are polarized to prevent the hot and the neutral connections from being reversed. In addition, many versions have a molded obstruction bump on top of the adapter, to block the grounding prong and thus physically prevent forcible insertion of a 3-prong plug in the wrong orientation.

== Use in residences ==
Three-prong plugs do not fit into the older, two-prong receptacles. When used as intended, the ground pin of the 3-wire receptacle is to be connected to a grounded cover screw, or to an external ground. In 1969, Underwriters Laboratories mandated three-prong plugs on major appliances for safety. At that time, only half of the receptacles in US homes were three-prong. Wiring in most homes did not include a grounding wire. The screws and outlet boxes were either connected to the neutral, or connected to nothing. Only in some jurisdictions where 2-wire non-metallic cable was restricted and armored cable was required (and still in good condition), do cheater plugs work safely as intended. In 1971, the US National Electrical Code (NEC) required grounded receptacles in all locations of the home (effective January 1, 1974).

== Safety ==
In the professional audio and video fields, the cheater plug has been identified as a serious safety problem. Its casual use as a method for avoiding ground loops in analog audio and video signals (to eliminate hums and buzzes) is dangerous. Bill Whitlock, president of Jensen Transformers, writes, "never, ever use devices such as 3 to 2-prong AC plug adapters, a.k.a. 'ground lifters', to solve a noise problem!" Whitlock relates how an electrical fault in one device that is connected to its electricity source through an ungrounded cheater plug will result in dangerous, high current flowing through audio or video cables. Whitlock notes that in 1997, consumer audio and video equipment electrocuted nine people.

The cheater plug is also recognized as a safety hazard in laboratory settings. For example, in August 2005, Tarun Mal, an associate professor at Cleveland State University, was electrocuted when he plugged a defective fluorescent lamp into a time switch using a cheater plug. Subsequently, the state of Ohio issued seven citations to the university for unsafe electrical conditions. The Scientist notes that four of the University's seven environmental safety experts agreed that use of the cheater plug "is not uncommon in US university labs". Jim Kaufman, CEO of the Laboratory Safety Institute, says, "When you inspect labs, it's not unusual to find anywhere from one to seven that way."

== Alternatives ==
There are several alternatives for connecting newer appliances to two-prong receptacles without rewiring the building: removing the grounding pin of the plug (unsafe), replacing the receptacle with a three-prong outlet (unsafe without proper ground), or replacing the receptacle with a Ground Fault Circuit Interrupter (GFCI).

Removing the grounding pin of the appliance’s plug is unsafe, and leaves the appliance without proper grounding even when relocated and plugged into a properly grounded three-prong receptacle. Additionally, since most NEMA 5-15P plugs have both current-carrying prongs the same width and rely on the ground pin for correct orientation, removing it allows insertion of the plug with hot and neutral wires reversed, creating an additional hazard. In most cases it also invalidates the manufacturer's warranty against defects as an unsupported modification of the appliance.

Replacing the receptacle with the three-prong type and leaving the ground screw unconnected is just as unsafe as using a cheater plug, but has the additional disadvantage that subsequent users of the outlet may not be aware that it is not properly grounded. Even worse, if the ground screw of the receptacle is connected to the neutral side, electric shock is possible even when the appliance is properly functioning. This is called a "false" or "bootleg" ground and is a serious safety hazard often undetected by common receptacle testers.

Replacing the obsolete receptacle with a GFCI receptacle is the safest alternative, other than installing a new cable from the main circuit breaker panel. If a Ground Fault Circuit Interrupter receptacle is properly functioning, it will interrupt dangerous current to limit the duration of a potentially lethal electric shock from an appliance precisely when the receptacle is not the only conductor to electrical ground (this is a ground fault, by definition). For the purpose of protecting humans against electric shocks, the National Electrical Code permits such replacement if the installer labels the GFCI as having "No Equipment Ground". When installed for this situation, the ground connection should be left unconnected. An external GFCI receptacle tester may not make an ungrounded GFCI trip, as these testers use the ground connection to simulate a fault. But the test button integrated into the GFCI receptacle should function normally and cause the outlet to shut off until it is reset manually. If it does not, the outlet is not protected and should be replaced.
