= 50 Hz =

50 Hz is a frequency that may refer to:

- the utility frequency (power line frequency) in large parts of the world
- the frame rate of video broadcasts in large parts of the world

== See also ==
- Interlaced video
- Mains hum
