= Live Bootleg =

Live Bootleg may refer to:

- Live Bootleg (Audio Adrenaline album)
- Live Bootleg (Hundred Reasons album)
- Live Bootleg (Mudvayne album)
- Live Bootleg (Resurrection Band album)
- Live! Bootleg, an album by Aerosmith
- Live Bootleg!, an album by the 2 Skinnee J's
- Live Bootleg '82, an album by Daniel Amos

== See also ==
- Bootleg (disambiguation)
