= Re-amp =

Process in multitrack recording

Re-amping is a process often used in multitrack recording in which a recorded signal is routed back out of the editing environment and run through external processing using effects units and then into a guitar amplifier and a guitar speaker cabinet or a reverb chamber. Originally, the technique was used mostly for electric guitars: it facilitates a separation of guitar playing from guitar amplifier processing—a previously recorded audio program is played back and re-recorded at a later time for the purpose of adding effects, ambiance such as reverb or echo, and the tone shaping imbued by certain amps and cabinets. The technique has since evolved over the 2000s to include many other applications. Re-amping can also be applied to other instruments and program, such as recorded drums, synthesizers, and virtual instruments.

Examples of common re-amping objectives include taking a pre-recorded electric guitar track and adding musically pleasing amplifier distortion/overdrive, room tone such as reverb, audio compression, EQ/filters, envelope followers, resonance, and gating. Re-amping is often used to "warm up" dry tracks, which often means adding complex, musically interesting effects. By playing a dry signal through a studio's main monitors and then using room mics to capture the ambiance, engineers are able to create realistic reverbs and blend the "wet" (modified) signal with the original dry recorded sound to achieve the desired amount of depth.

The technique is especially useful for "softening" stereo drum tracks. By pointing the monitors away from each other and miking each speaker individually, the stereo image can be well preserved and a new sense of "depth" can be added to the track. It is important for audio engineers to check that the microphones being used are in phase to avoid problems with the mix.

== Example ==
An electric guitarist records a dry, unprocessed, unaffected track in a recording studio. This is often achieved by connecting the guitar into a DI unit (a Direct Input or Direct Inject buffer box) that is fed to a recording console or, alternatively, bypassing the console by using an outboard preamplifier. Often, the guitarist's signal is sent to both recorder and guitar amp simultaneously, providing the guitarist with a proper amplifier "feel" while they are playing while also tracking (recording) a dry (un-effects processed) signal.

Later, the dry, direct, unprocessed guitar recording is fed to a bridging device (a Reamp unit or reverse DI box) to "re-record" the guitarist's unprocessed performance through a dedicated guitar amplifier cabinet and/or external effects units. The guitar amplifier is placed in the live room or isolation booth of the recording studio and is set up to produce the desired tonal quality, including distortion character and room reverberation. A microphone is placed near the guitar speaker and a new track is recorded, producing the re-amplified, processed track. The microphone cable is connected to the mixing console or mic preamp using a cable, as usual, without using a bridging device.

External effects such as stomp boxes and guitar multi-fx processors can also be included in the re-amping process. As well as physical devices that require an impedance-matched guitar pickup signal, software-based virtual guitar effects and amps can be included in the re-amping process.

== Advantages of re-amping ==
Re-amping allows guitarists and other electronic musicians to record their tracks and go home, leaving the engineer and producer to spend more time dialing in "just right" settings and effects on prerecorded tracks. When re-amping electric guitar tracks, the guitarist need not be present for the engineer to experiment with a range of effects, mic positions, speaker cabinets, amplifiers, effects pedals, and overall tonality – continuously replaying the prerecorded tracks while experimenting with new settings and tones. When a desired tone is finally achieved, the guitarist's dry performance is re-recorded, or "re-amped," with all added effects.

Manufacturers of instrument processing gear such as guitar effects, or equipment reviewers, can gather a library of dry performance tracks, performed and edited well, and then run these ideal tracks through the processing gear to demonstrate the sounds that the processing gear can produce. An unlimited number of performance playback passes, including looping, enables trying out many combinations of settings quickly, including microphone techniques. When guitar amp or amp simulator designers try various circuit component values or settings, they can use the dry tracks as prepared, always available input test signals, and consistent reference signals.

Another advantage of re-amping is that it enables producers and band members to have more options for remixing and redoing a recording a long time after the original recording. If the original recording of a song with electric guitar is done in 1985, and the electric guitarist's sound was only recorded with a mic in front of their combo amp or speaker cabinet, the recording will lock in the specific type of distortion, reverb, flanger processing and other effects that were used, which might sound "dated" several decades later. A producer who is tasked with doing a remix of this song 30 years later cannot "undo" or remove the distortion, reverb, chorus or flanger effects, and so there are limited options for remixing the guitar sound. On the other hand, if the engineering and production team in 1985 had simultaneously tracked (recorded) a "dry", DI out signal from the electric guitar's pickups, a producer remixing the song 30 years later could take the dry guitar signal and re-amp it through 2000s-era digital effects and speaker systems, giving a new sound to this 1985 track.

== Electronic interfacing ==
Direct inject (DI) is a device for connecting an unbalanced, high-impedance, low-level signal (commonly a guitar pickup's signal) into audio equipment designed for a low-impedance balanced signal, such as a digital audio workstation (DAW), or audio console. Reverse-DI means running this same device or technique in reverse – connecting a high-level (typically balanced, low-impedance) signal into audio equipment that was designed for low-level, unbalanced, high-impedance signals, such as a guitar amplifier.

Playing back a signal from recording studio equipment directly into a guitar amplifier can cause unwanted side-effects such as input-stage distortion, treble loss or overemphasis, and ground-loop hum; thus there is sometimes a need for impedance conversion, level-matching, and ground alteration. Like running a guitar signal through a guitar effects pedal that is set to Bypass, re-amping introduces some degree of sonic degradation compared to playing a guitar live directly into a guitar amp rig.

A re-amping device commonly employs a reversed Direct Inject (DI) transformer with some resistors added for level and impedance shift. Level and impedance adjustment can be achieved by adding a potentiometer or adjustable resistor. A proper re-amping device converts a balanced signal to an unbalanced signal, reduces a high studio-level (line-level) signal down to a low guitar-level signal, and shifts the output to a high instrument-level impedance (typically a guitar pickup impedance).

In conventional re-amplification, a dry recorded signal is sent into a balanced XLR input. An unbalanced ¼" (Tip-Sleeve) phone connector is typically used for the output, which is connected to the guitar amp rig. Some re-amping devices offer a pad (attenuator) switch to reduce a too-hot output level. Sometimes a guitar volume pedal or buffered effects pedal can work adequately for re-amping, depending on grounding, levels, and impedance. Another approach to simulating the high impedance of a guitar pickup is to use a passive DI and add a 10 K-ohm resistor in series with the signal connection inside a 1/4" plug.

== Terminology ==
While "reverse DI" re-recording techniques have been used for decades, the process was popularized in part by the introduction of the Reamp device in 1993. The registered trademark "Reamp" describes a patented invention (U.S. patent 6,005,950) filed in 1994 by audio engineer John Cuniberti, perhaps best known for his lifelong engineering work with guitarist Joe Satriani. The Reamp inductively couples balanced line-level sources into unbalanced guitar-level destinations (e.g., DAW output to guitar amp input) and includes a potentiometer that alters both signal level and source impedance. Derivations of the Reamp trademark, such as "reamping" and "re-amplification," have become common terminology in professional audio to describe the process of amplified re-recording – much like the word "Band-aid" is often used to describe adhesive bandages (see Genericized trademark).

== History ==
The process of re-recording has been used throughout the history of recording studios. Pierre Schaeffer in the 1930s and 1940s used recorded sounds, such as trains, and played them back with ambient alteration, re-recording the net result. Karlheinz Stockhausen and Edgard Varèse later used similar techniques. Les Paul and Mary Ford recorded layered vocal harmonies and guitar parts, modifying prior tracks with effects such as ambient reverb while recording the net result together on a new track. Les Paul placed a loudspeaker at one end of a tunnel and a microphone at the other end. The loudspeaker played back previously recorded material - the microphone recorded the resulting altered sound.

Roger Nichols claims to have used a guitar re-recording process (not reverse DI) in 1968, partly to spread the stress on cranked tube amps across multiple amps, one at a time. A sound would be dialed in for several hours on one cranked guitar amplifier, and if this stress audibly wore down the amplifier components, another amplifier would be used to record the remaining work. It has been noted that Phil Spector, re-mixing the original Beatles’ Let It Be master tapes in 1970, may have re-recorded dry electric guitar program through a guitar amplifier.

Film sound re-recording is a time-honored practice. Sound designer Walter Murch is known for a technique called "worldizing" in which "real world" ambiance is added, via re-recording, to dry recorded program. Sound designer Nick Peck describes the worldizing process: "Place a speaker in a room or location with the desired aural fingerprint and position a microphone some distance from the speaker. Next, play back your original sounds through the speaker and re-record them on another recorder, capturing the sound with all the reverberant characteristics of the space. This requires much time and effort, but when only the most authentic reproduction will do, worldizing can get you there."

== Legal ==
Radial and Millennia Media products use the Reamp patent, or a variant of the patent, under license. The Reamp Company acknowledges that words such as "reamping" have become generic/colloquial audio expressions, but asserts that the word Reamp remains their legally registered trademark. In late 2010 Recording engineer John Cuniberti announced the sale of his Reamp patent, trademark and all business assets to Vancouver, Canada-based Radial Engineering Ltd., a leading manufacturer of products used by audio professionals and musicians around the world.

== See also ==
- DI unit
- Distortion (guitar)
- Guitar amplifier
- Guitar speaker
- Impedance matching
- Isolation cabinet (guitar)
- Leslie speaker
- Recording studio
