= Electrical outlet tester =

Device to verify the function of an electrical outlet

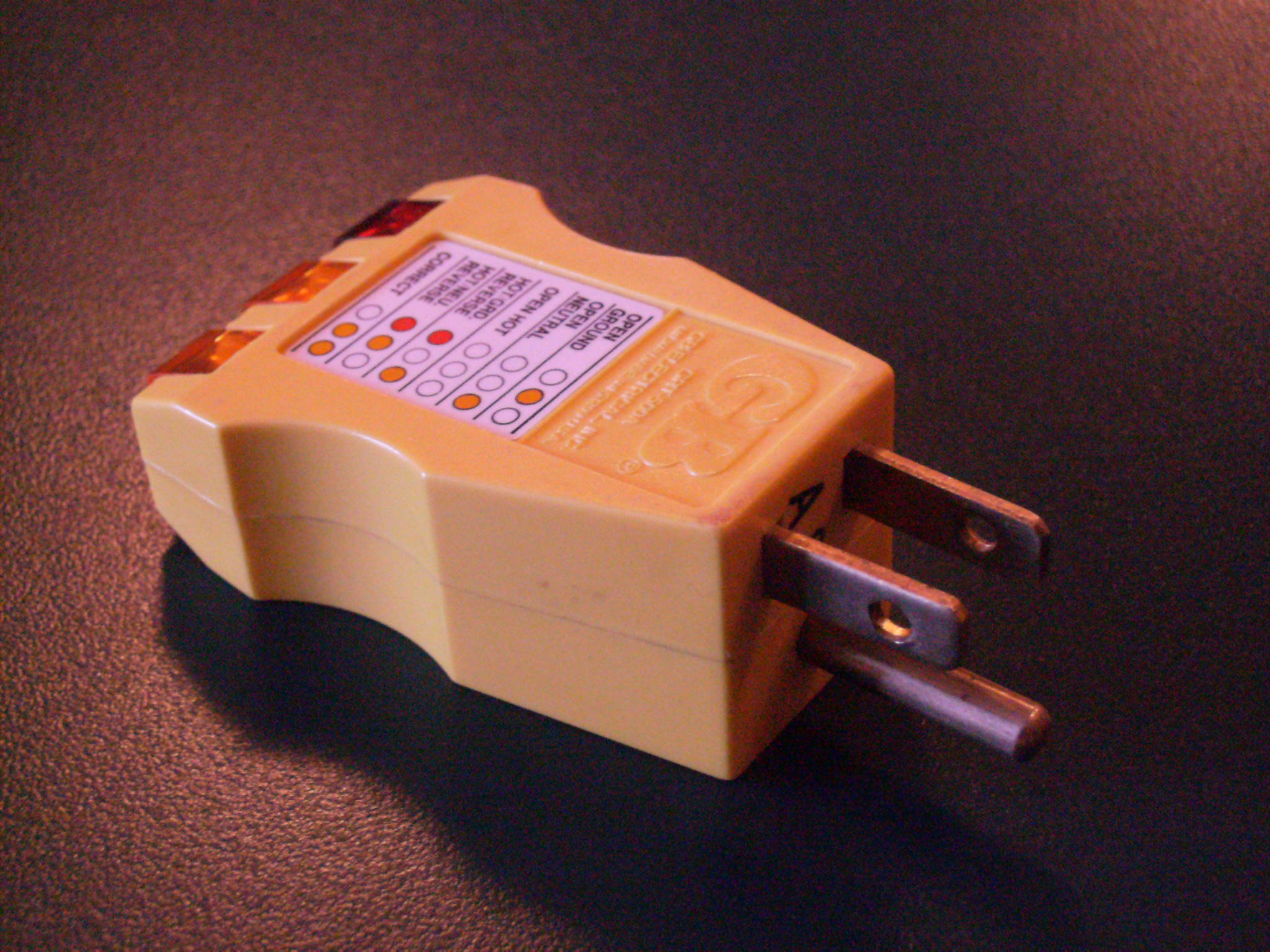
A receptacle tester for North American wiring

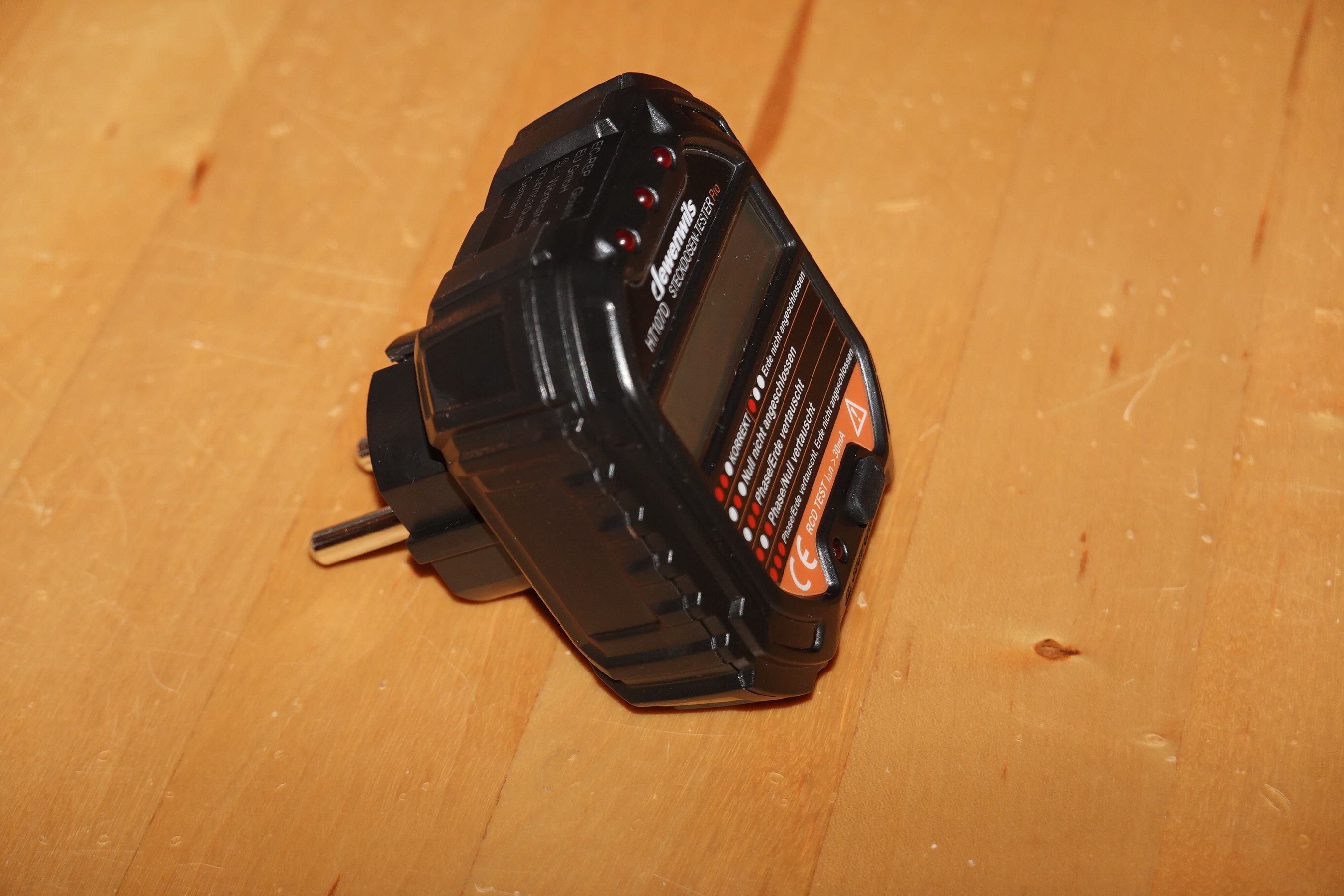
A receptacle tester for European wiring

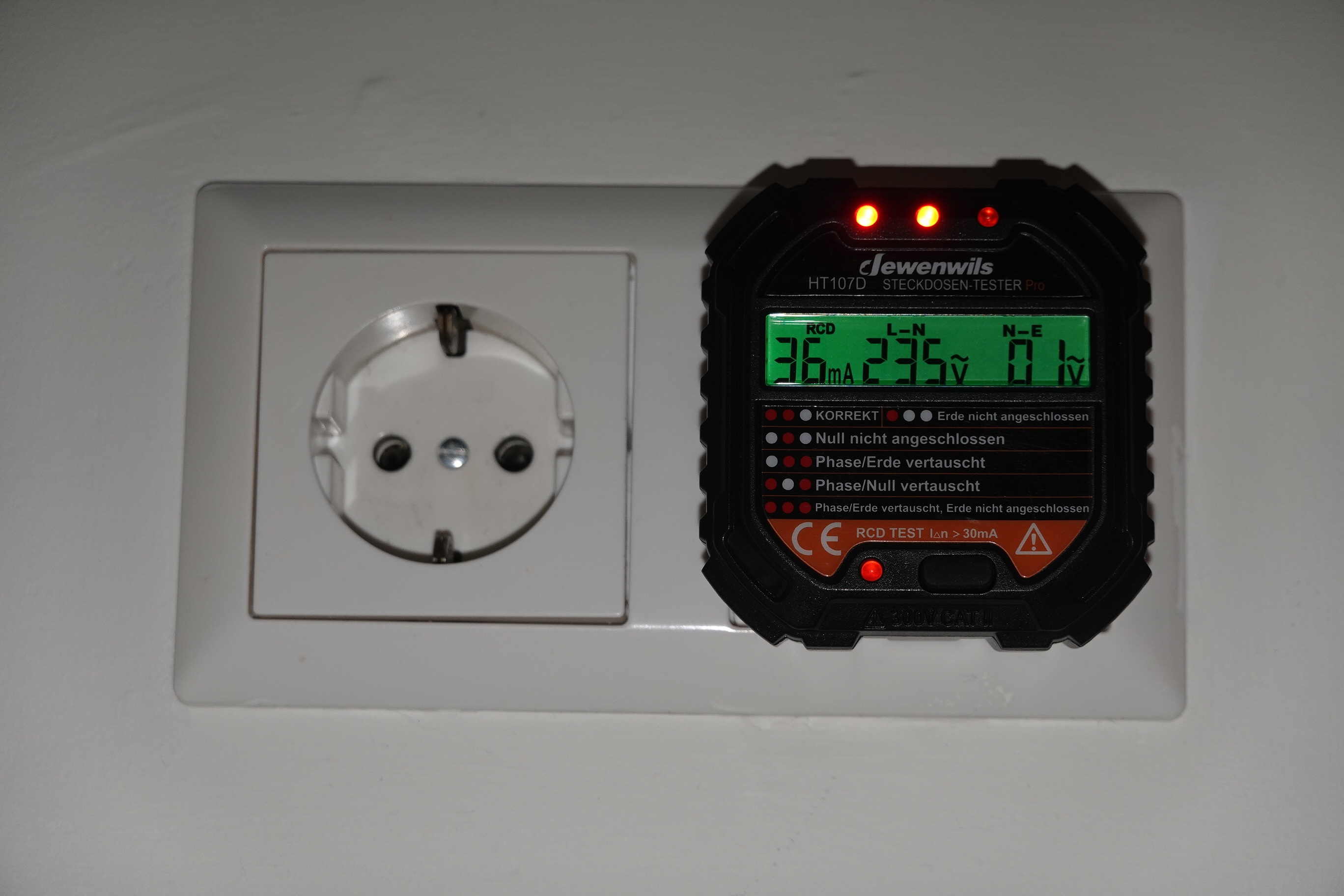
GFCI tester operating in European socket

An electrical outlet tester, receptacle tester, or socket tester is a small device containing a 3-prong power plug and three indicator lights, used for quickly detecting some types of incorrectly-wired electrical wall outlets or campsite supplies.

== Tests and limitations ==
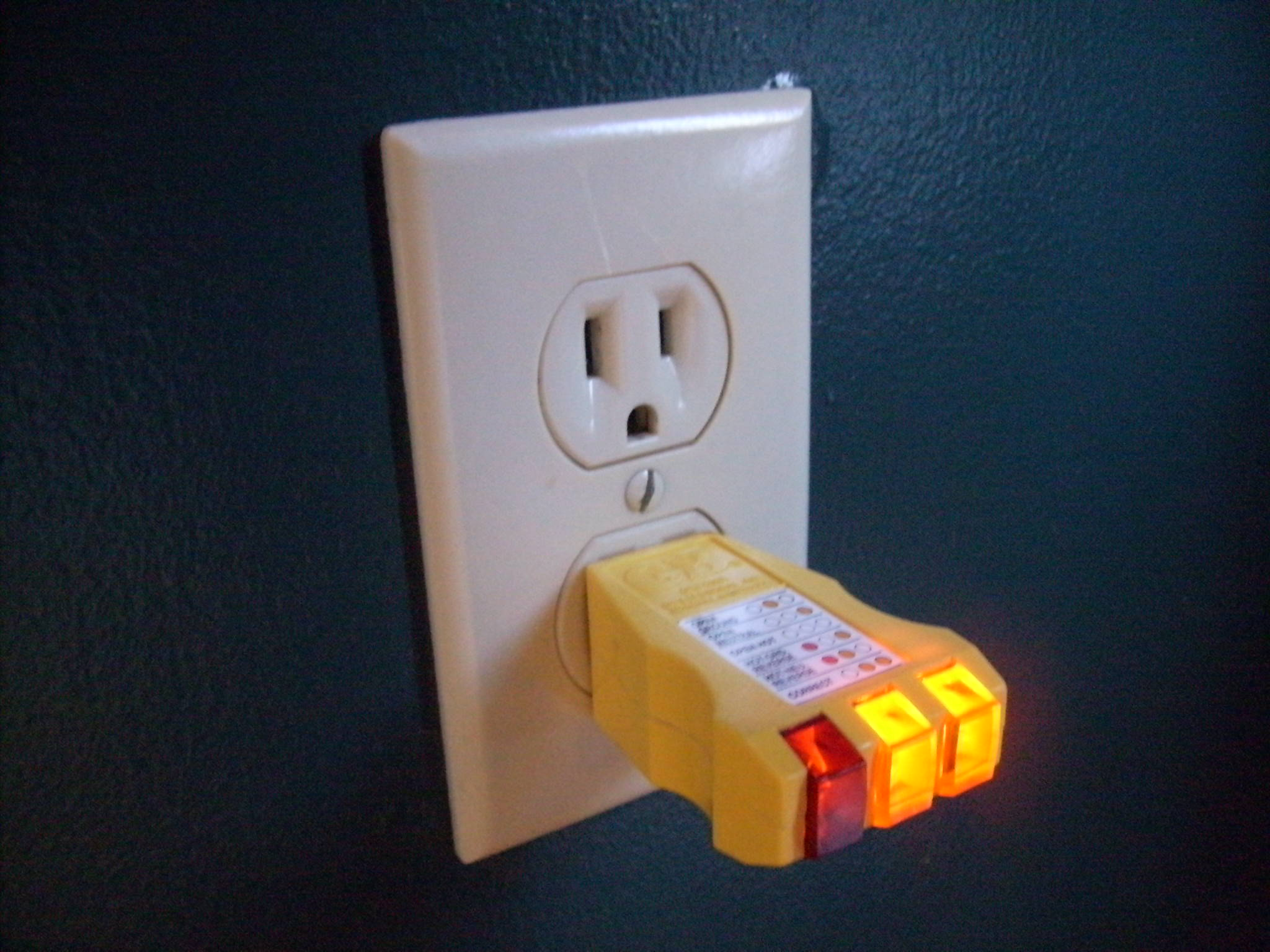
A receptacle tester being used to check for some types of improper wiring of an outlet. For this particular tester, proper wiring is indicated by the two yellow lights.

The outlet tester checks that each contact in the outlet appears to be connected to the correct wire in the building's electrical wiring. It can identify several common wiring errors, including swapped phase and neutral, and failure to connect ground.

The tester confirms continuity and polarity of the electrical connections, but it does not verify current-carrying ability, electrical safety (which requires impedance testing), insulation breakdown voltage, or loop connection of ring mains.

Simple three-light testers cannot detect some potentially serious house wiring errors, including neutral and ground interchanged at the receptacle. There may be a "bootleg ground", where the neutral and ground pins have been connected together at the receptacle, which cannot be detected either. These problems can be detected with a multimeter and a test load, to verify that the ground connection is separate from the neutral and is not carrying normal circuit return current, or more typically by using a more-sophisticated multifunction tester.

A quick supplemental screening test for these simple miswiring errors can be performed using a non-contact voltage tester (NCVT) or non-contact voltage detector. If a problem is thus identified, it can be investigated further using more-advanced equipment, or the outlet in question can be de-energized and disassembled for careful scrutiny.

Some receptacle testers include an additional test button to test the triggering of GFCI devices, which supplements the built-in test button on the GFCI and can be used for testing outlets downstream from a GFCI receptacle. "Plug-in analyzers" may include earth loop impedance and other checks.

== History ==
An early reference that describes the typical outlet tester circuit was published in Popular Mechanics in the March issue of 1967, and consists of two 27 kΩ resistors, one 100 kΩ resistor, and three NE-51 neon lamp bulbs with 100 kΩ resistors.

== See also ==
- Polarized plugs
- Test light
