= DI unit =

Audio signal conversion device

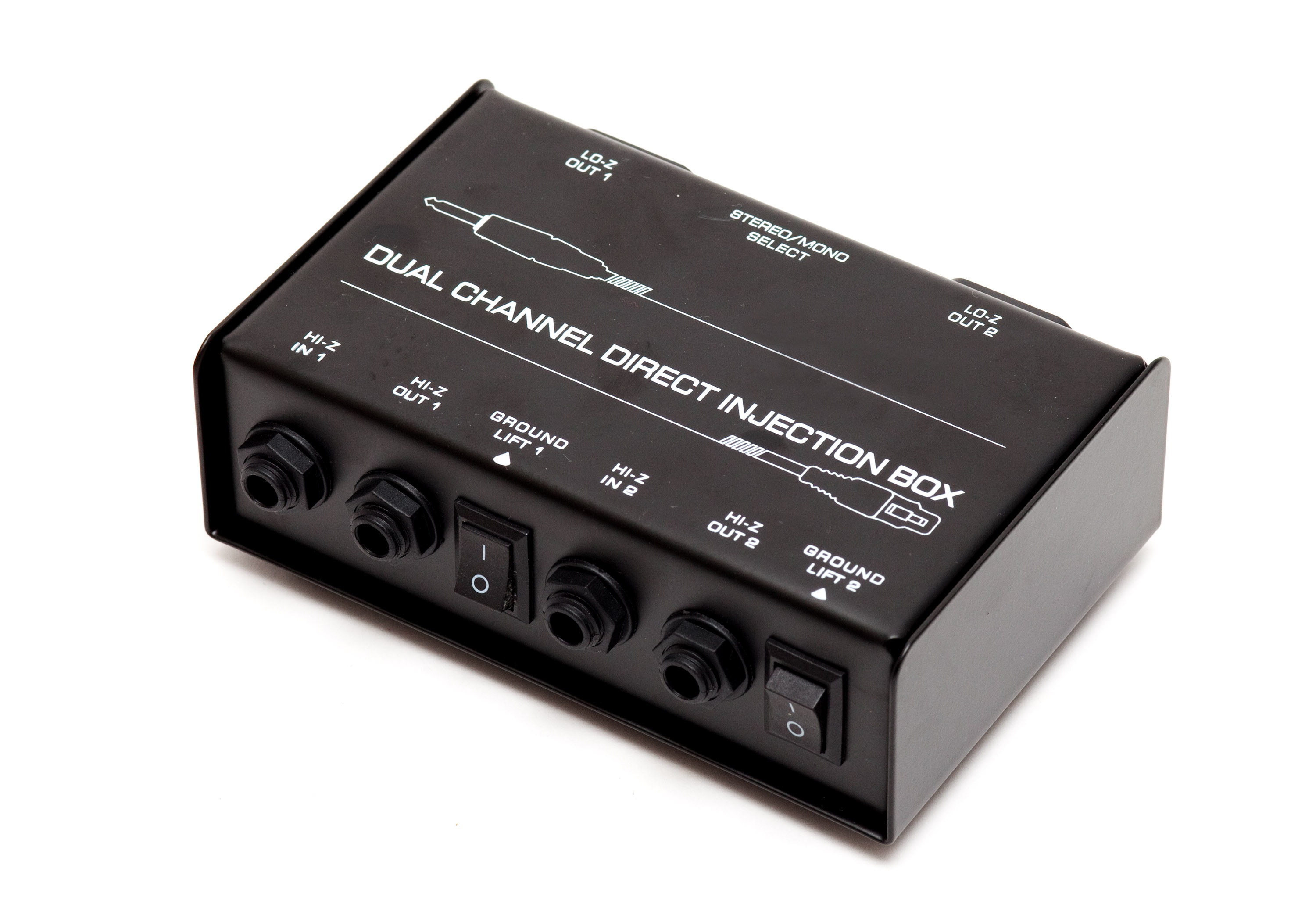
A professional passive DI box. It is passive because it does not need external power to operate. DI boxes which require a power source (batteries or phantom power) are called active DI boxes.

A DI unit (direct input or direct inject) is an electronic device typically used in recording studios and in sound reinforcement systems to connect a high output impedance unbalanced output signal to a low-impedance, microphone level, balanced input, usually via an XLR connector and XLR cable.

DI units are also referred to as a DI box, direct box, or simply DI, with each letter pronounced, as in "Dee Eye." The term is variously claimed to stand for direct input, direct injection (a British term), direct induction or direct interface.

"Traditional guitar amps and speakers are fairly lo-fi devices that squash dynamic range, introduce distortion and narrow the frequency range. In contrast, a properly interfaced direct guitar signal will sound super clean, dynamic, punchy and far brighter." - Guitar.com Magazine

DIs are frequently used to connect an electric guitar, electric bass or electronic musical keyboard to a mixing console's microphone input jack. Its signal comes "direct" from the source instrument without passing through the air as sound waves, and thus is isolated from other sounds and avoids effects of microphone or room acoustics. The DI performs level matching, balancing, and either active buffering or passive impedance matching or impedance bridging. DI units are typically metal boxes with input and output jacks and, for more expensive units, “ground lift” and attenuator switches.

DI boxes are extensively used with professional and semi-professional PA systems, professional sound reinforcement systems and in sound recording studios. Manufacturers produce a wide range of units, from inexpensive, basic, passive units to expensive, sophisticated, active units. DI boxes may provide numerous features and user-controllable options (e.g., a user-selectable 0dB, 20dB or 40dB pad and/or a "ground lift" switch). They may come in different types of enclosures, usually a metal chassis that helps to protect against electrical interference. Some bass amplifiers have built-in DI units, so that the bass amp's output signal can be connected directly to a mixing board in a sound reinforcement/live show or recording context.

== History ==
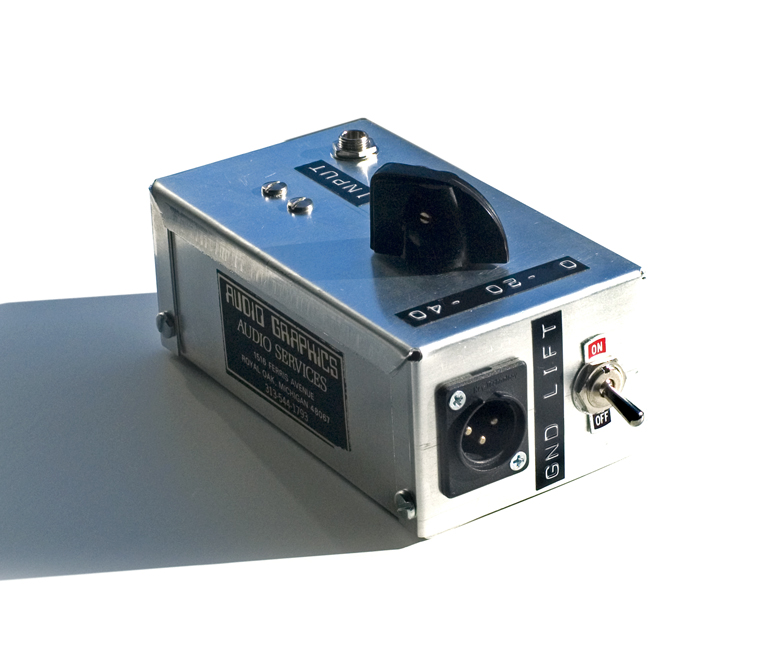
A vintage Wolfbox custom-made by audio engineer Ed Wolfrum in the 1960s.

Passive direct boxes first appeared in the United States in the middle 1960s, most notably in Detroit at radio stations and recording studios like Motown, United Sound Systems, Golden World Records, Tera Shirma Studios and the Metro-Audio Capstan Roller remote recording truck. These DIs were custom made by engineers like Ed Wolfrum with his "Wolfbox" and by concert sound companies to help amplify electric musical instruments.

These boxes typically contained an audio transformer with a turns ratio from approximately 8:1 to 12:1 to help with impedance bridging from the high output impedance of an instrument's pickup to the relatively lower input impedance of a typical mixing console's microphone preamp. For example, the Triad A-11J used in the Wolfbox has a turns ratio of 10:1 and thus an impedance ratio of 100:1. The typical console preamp input impedance of 1,500 ohms would appear to the electronic instrument as a high input impedance of 150,000 ohms.

The passive direct box was suitable for most electronic musical instruments but it negatively colored the sound of instruments with weaker output signals, such as Fender Rhodes pianos and Fender Precision Basses with single-coil pickups. To accommodate these instruments, active direct boxes were designed containing powered electronic circuitry which increased the input impedance to above 1,000,000 ohms. In 1975, a 48-volt phantom powered active direct box was designed for Leon Russell's recording studio, its circuitry published in the April 1975 edition of dB, the sound engineering magazine. The sound company Tycobrahe, known for supporting large rock festivals such as California Jam, offered an active direct box for sale in 1977 capable of +9 dBm line level output with a built-in attenuator to compensate for various input levels.

== Purpose ==
There are two related purposes for a direct box: audio and electrical. The audio purpose is to deliver a clean, unaltered instrument signal to a mixing console or recording device, where it may be processed using other devices (equalization, compression, modulation, reverberation, etc.) to meet the needs of the audio production. Without a direct box, an instrument or microphone needs to be connected to an amplifier, which might then be connected to a speaker, another microphone, and then to the mixing console. These electronic stages and cables can color the sound in ways that some audio engineers and musicians find undesirable. Of course the reverse is true—many times musicians and audio engineers seek this coloring because it fits the style of music or recording.

The electrical purpose of a direct box is to bridge the impedance of the input and output. Most electronic instruments and microphones cannot be plugged directly into the pre-amplifier inputs of mixing boards or recording devices because of impedance mismatch. Instruments are typically high impedance, whereas microphone inputs are low impedance.

The direct box takes a high impedance, unbalanced signal and converts it to a low impedance, balanced signal. This allows the signal to be sent over long cable runs without signal loss, and greater rejection of interference due to the benefit of common mode rejection in a balanced signal. Furthermore, it allows the low impedance signal to be sent to the input preamp of a mixing console which is designed to accept input from low impedance microphones.

Because all cables are capacitive, long cables used in live sound and recording can become a low‑pass filter which reduces the high end frequencies when used with high-impedance source. Another advantage of DI units is that the DI contains a transformer to provide galvanic isolation that can eliminate a ground‑loop hum.

== Typical applications ==
Direct boxes are typically used with electric instruments or other electronic musical devices that only contain an unbalanced 1/4" phone output which needs to be connected to an XLR input of a mixing board. Multiple direct box circuits can be mounted inside one housing. These are used for multiple unbalanced outputs, such as for a bank of electronic keyboards.

=== Acoustic or electric instruments ===
DI boxes can be used on instruments with electronic circuitry and pickups that do not contain an XLR balanced output. An example of this application would be an electric keyboard that needs to be connected to a mixing board, either directly or through an audio snake. Another example would be an acoustic guitar with pickups, an electric guitar or bass guitar, or a double bass with piezoelectric pickups. These instruments could be plugged into a DI box, and the DI signal would be mixed through a mixing console into a main or monitor mix.

=== Instrument amplifiers ===
Some instrument amplifiers, particularly bass amplifiers, contain built-in DI units, and can be connected to a mixing console directly without needing an external direct box. This would be a typical setup for a bassist who wanted to connect their instrument through a public address system (PA system) or sound reinforcement system at a live show, while keeping the unique sound of the amplifier's preamplifier and equalizer circuitry and the custom settings. In comparison, if an external DI box is used, with the bassist plugging their bass into the DI box and sending the signal to their bass amp, the DI box signal would be the direct signal from the bass' pickups. With the external DI box approach, the sound shaping added to the bass' signal on the amplifier (e.g. boosting the preamplifier, adding overdrive, or adjusting the equalization to change the tone) would not be present in the external DI box signal. Some instrument amplifiers have the ability to turn off the amplifier's equalizer (EQ) through a pre-eq/post-eq switch. This can be used if a "clean" direct output from the amplifier is desired, which does not contain the tone shaping created by the bassist's adjustment of the EQ controls.

It is common to use both a DI signal and a microphone in front of the speaker cabinet or combo amp, in both live sound and recording settings. One method is to connect a bass guitar amplifier's speaker level output (via a pad, to attenuate the signal) to a DI and then run it to one channel of the mixing console, and run a miked guitar speaker cabinet signal into another channel of the mixing console. Another method is to connect a DI between the guitar and the amplifier. The DI signal and mic'd guitar speaker can then be selectively blended, with the DI providing a more immediate, present, bright, un-equalized sound, and the microphone providing a more 'live' sound, with instrument amplifier and speaker enclosure characteristics and some room ambience (natural reverb).

== Examples of use ==
Direct-input tracking is used on almost every electric bass part on Sgt. Pepper's Lonely Hearts Club Band, most prominently on "Lucy in the Sky with Diamonds", "When I'm Sixty-Four", "Lovely Rita", and "A Day in the Life", as well as "Only a Northern Song", "I Me Mine", and the lead-guitar introducing "Revolution". Other examples include Dave Matthews Band's "So Much To Say" and Adele's "Daydreamer". The main guitar riff on Led Zeppelin's "Black Dog" was recorded directly through a mic-preamp and fed through a pair of 1176 Peak Limiters. Byrds frontman and guitarist Roger Mcguinn achieved his famous jangly guitar sound in the studio by recording his 12-string Rickenbacker direct-in through a compressor to emphasize the treble.

== Passive units ==
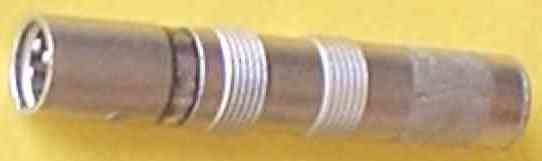
A very simple, inexpensive passive DI

A passive DI with "throughput" in addition to XLR output

A passive DI unit consists of an audio transformer used as a balun. The term "passive" indicates that the unit does not require a power source (such as batteries or phantom power) to operate. The quality of the audio transformer significantly impacts the fidelity and noise suppression capabilities of passive DI boxes. Manufacturers commonly highlight that high-quality transformers are essential for effective, noise-free audio signal transmission. This makes passive DIs less expensive, but it also means that they cannot amplify signal power. The turns ratio on a passive DI is typically chosen to convert a nominal 50 kΩ signal source (such as the magnetic pickup of an electric guitar or electric bass) to the 100–200 Ω expected by the mic input of an audio mixer. Typical turns ratios are in the range of 10:1 to 20:1. Less commonly, a passive DI unit may consist of a resistive load, with or without capacitor coupling. Such units are best suited to outputs designed for headphones or loudspeakers.

The less expensive passive DI units are more susceptible to hum, and passive units tend to be less versatile than active; however, they require no power source, are simpler to use, and the better units are extremely reliable when used as designed. The lack of batteries in passive DIs means that users do not have to worry about batteries losing their power in the middle of a live show or recording session.

Some models have no settings or switches, while others can have a ground lift switch (to avoid ground loop problems or hums), a pad switch (to accommodate different source levels and attenuate too-strong signals) and a passive filter/equalization switch for coloring the sound or tone.

== Active units ==
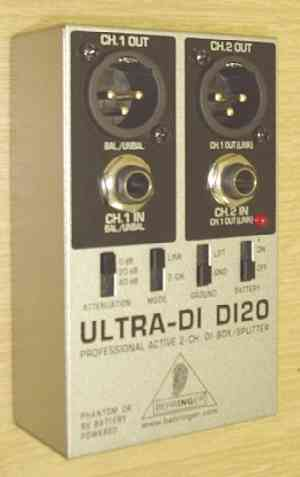
An active stereo DI with pass-through in mono mode only

An active DI unit contains a preamplifier. Active DI units can therefore provide gain, and are inherently more complex and versatile than passive units. Active DI units require a power source, which is normally provided by batteries or a standard AC outlet connection, and may contain the option for phantom power use. Most active DI units provide switches to enhance their versatility. These may include gain or level adjustment, ground lift, power source selection, and mono or stereo mode. Ground lift switches often disconnect phantom power. Some active DI units also have electronic effects units.

A pass-through connector is a second jack, sometimes simply paralleled to the input connector, that delivers the input signal unchanged, to allow the DI unit to be inserted into a signal path without interrupting it. This allows a user, such as an electric bass player, to plug their bass into a DI unit, which routes the bass signal to the mixing board, and at the same time plug the bass into an onstage bass amp for monitoring purposes. Pass-through is also commonly referred to as a bypass. True-bypass occurs when the signal goes straight from the input jack to the output jack with no circuitry involved and no loading of the source impedance. False bypass (or simply 'bypass') occurs when the signal is routed through the device circuitry with buffering and no other intentional change to the signal. However, due to the nature of electrical designs there is almost always some slight change in the signal. The extent of change and how noticeable it may be can vary from unit to unit.

== Preamplifier-DI units ==
A number of companies make combination preamplifier-DI units for electric bass, double bass, or for acoustic instruments which use piezoelectric pickups (e.g., a violin, acoustic guitar, mandolin, etc.). These units may be housed in a "stompbox" pedal format, in a small rackmount unit (often less than a full rack space), or in units designed to be clipped to a belt or attached to an instrument.

Preamplifiers for electric bass typically contain gain knobs, sometimes including an overdrive effect unit, equalizer knobs and, for some higher-end units, multiple channels (e.g., a "clean" channel and a "dirty" channel, with the latter containing an overdrive effect).

Preamp-DI units for double bass and other acoustic instruments often omit the overdrive features, but add additional features that help to produce a good sound and tone for acoustic instruments, such as an audio compression effect, a polarity inverter switch and a notch filter (the latter two features designed to help reduce unwanted audio feedback "howls"). Preamp-DIs for acoustic instruments often include two channels and a simple mixer, to enable the player to use both a pickup and a condensor microphone. Some preamp-DIs provide phantom power, in case this is required to power a condenser microphone. Preamp-DI units may be battery powered, have an AC mains plug, or both.

== See also ==
- Re-amp
