= Multifunction tester =

A multifunction tester or MFT is an electronic device used by electricians to test electrical circuits that use the "low" and "extra-low voltages" typically used by consumers in domestic, commercial and agricultural settings.

Multifunction testers are able to perform continuity tests (or low ohms resistance tests) and insulation resistance tests (or high ohms resistance tests) and they may also be able to perform earth fault loop impedance tests, prospective short-circuit current tests, earth electrode tests and RCD tests.
