= Laboratory Safety Institute =

The Laboratory Safety Institute (LSI) is a 501(c)3 non-profit organization based in the United States that supports safety in science education.

Founded in 1978 by Dr. James Kaufman to provide safety training for secondary school science teachers, LSI has grown to become "An International Center for Health, Safety and Environmental Affairs."

LSI members are science educators and administrators as well as corporate hygiene officers, directors of environmental affairs, chemical handling and storage and waste management personnel.

LSI publishes articles and newsletters regarding best practices in laboratory safety as well as safety manuals and teaching tools for teachers and laboratory managers.
