= Mains hum =

Unwanted sound associated with AC power

Mains hum, electric hum, cycle hum, or power line hum is a sound associated with alternating current which is twice the frequency of the mains electricity. The fundamental frequency of this sound is usually double that of the local power-line frequency: that is to say, 100 Hz in areas with 50 Hz power, and 120 Hz in areas with 60 Hz power. The sound often has heavy harmonic content above 50/60 Hz. Due to the presence of mains current in mains-powered audio equipment as well as ubiquitous AC electromagnetic fields from nearby appliances and wiring, 50/60 Hz electrical noise can get into audio systems, and is heard as mains hum from their speakers. Mains hum may also be heard coming from powerful electric power grid equipment such as utility transformers, caused by mechanical vibrations induced by magnetostriction in magnetic cores. Onboard aircraft (or spacecraft) the frequency heard is often higher pitched, due to the use of 400 Hz AC power in these settings because 400 Hz transformers are much smaller and lighter.

50 Hz hum

60 Hz hum

400 Hz hum

== Causes ==
Electric hum around transformers is caused by stray magnetic fields causing the enclosure and accessories to vibrate. Magnetostriction is a second source of vibration, in which the core iron changes shape minutely when exposed to magnetic fields. The intensity of the fields, and thus the "hum" intensity, is a function of the applied voltage. Due to the magnetic flux density being strongest twice every electrical cycle, the fundamental "hum" frequency will be twice the electrical frequency. Additional harmonics above 100/120 Hz will be caused by the non-linear behavior of most common magnetic materials.

Around high-voltage power lines, hum may be produced by corona discharge.

In the realm of sound reinforcement (as in public address systems and loudspeakers), electric hum is often caused by induction. This hum is generated by oscillating electric currents induced in sensitive (high gain or high impedance) audio circuitry by the alternating electromagnetic fields emanating from nearby mains-powered devices like power transformers. The audible aspect of this sort of electric hum is produced by amplifiers and loudspeakers (note that this is not to be confused with acoustic feedback).

The other major source of hum in audio equipment is shared impedances; when a heavy current is flowing through a conductor (a ground trace) that a small-signal device is also connected to. All practical conductors will have a finite, if small, resistance, and the small resistance present means that devices using different points on the conductor as a ground reference will be at slightly different potentials. This hum is usually at the second harmonic of the power line frequency (100 Hz or 120 Hz), since the heavy ground currents are from AC to DC power supplies that rectify the mains waveform. (See also ground loop.)

In vacuum tube equipment, one potential source of hum is current leakage between the heaters and cathodes of the tubes. Another source is direct emission of electrons from the heater, or magnetic fields produced by the heater. Tubes for critical applications may have the heater circuit powered by direct current to prevent this source of hum.

Leakage of analogue video signals can give rise to hum sounding very similar to mains hum.

== Prevention ==
It is often the case that electric hum at a venue is picked up via a ground loop. In this situation, an amplifier and a mixing desk are typically at some distance from one another. The chassis of each item is grounded via the mains earth pin, and is also connected along a different pathway via the conductor of a shielded cable. As these two pathways do not run alongside each other, an electrical circuit in the shape of a loop is formed. The same situation occurs between musical instrument amplifiers on stage and the mixing desk. To fix this, stage equipment often has a "ground lift" switch which breaks the loop. Another solution is to connect the source and destination through a 1:1 isolation transformer, called variously audio humbucker or iso coil. An extremely deadly option is to break contact with the ground wire by using an AC ground lift adapter or by breaking the earth pin off the power plug used at the mixing deck. Depending on the design and layout of the audio equipment, lethal voltages between the (now isolated) ground at the mixing desk and earth ground can then develop. Any contact between the AC line live terminals and the equipment chassis will energize all the cable shields and interconnected equipment.

=== Humbucking ===
Humbucking is a technique of introducing a small amount of line-frequency signal so as to cancel any hum introduced, or otherwise arrange to electrically cancel the effect of induced line frequency hum.

Humbucking is a process in which "hum" that is causing objectionable artifacts, generally in audio or video systems, is reduced. In a humbucker electric guitar pickup or microphone, two coils are used instead of one; they are arranged in opposing polarity so that AC hum induced in the two coils will cancel, while still giving a signal for the movement of the guitar strings or diaphragm.

In certain vacuum-tube radio receivers, a winding on the dynamic speaker field coil was connected in series with the power supply to help cancel any residual hum.

Some other common applications of this process are:

- Humbucking transformers or coils used in video systems.
- Telephone (and other audio) system and computer communications wiring.

== Consequences ==
=== In music ===
In musical instruments, hum is usually treated as a nuisance, and various electrical modifications are made to eliminate it. For instance, humbucker pickups on electric guitars are designed to reduce the hum. Sometimes hum is used creatively, for example in dub and glitch music.

==== John Lennon demos ====
In the late 1970s, former Beatle John Lennon recorded some demo songs at his and Yoko Ono's Dakota apartment. These demos did not see any official release at the time, nor were they properly recorded for Double Fantasy or its follow-up Milk and Honey, but they did spread as bootlegs amongst Lennon fans.

In the mid-1990s, as part of the Beatles anthology series, the three surviving members, Paul McCartney, George Harrison, and Ringo Starr, regrouped to record initially incidental music for the albums, but decided to rework some John Lennon demos instead. Several demos were given to McCartney from Ono, the most notable being "Free as a Bird", "Real Love", and "Now and Then".

Of the demos received, only the aforementioned three were worked on. Of the three, "Real Love" and "Now and Then" were more difficult to work on than "Free as a Bird," as both contained a prominent 60-cycle mains hum as a result of the cheap recording equipment Lennon used to record the demos. While the mains hum was removed from "Real Love", it was noticeably louder on "Now and Then", which made it much harder to remove. This, and to a much bigger extent, Harrison's distaste for that particular demo, led to it being scrapped altogether, although reports circulated in the years since that McCartney was hoping to finish it. In 2009, a version of Lennon's demo, supposedly without the mains hum that hampered the Beatles version, appeared as a bootleg. In 2023, the mains hum was finally removed thanks to Peter Jackson's sound source separation technology, and the track was released on November 2, 2023.

=== In audio systems ===
Power line hum can be alleviated using a band-stop filter.

=== In video systems ===
In analog video, mains hum can be seen as hum bars, (bands of slightly different brightness) scrolling vertically up the screen. Broadcast television frame rates are chosen to match the line frequency, to minimize the disturbance these bars cause to the picture. A hum bar can be caused by a ground loop in cables carrying analog video signals, poor power supply smoothing, or magnetic interference with the cathode-ray tube.

=== In forensics ===
Electrical network frequency (ENF) analysis is a forensic technique for validating audio recordings by comparing frequency changes in background mains hum in the recording with long-term high-precision historical records of mains frequency changes from a database. In effect the mains hum signal is treated as a time-dependent digital watermark that can be used to find when the recording was created, and to help to detect any edits in the sound recording.

== See also ==
- Electromagnetically induced acoustic noise
- High frequency noise in CRTs
- Transposition (transmission lines)
- Valve amplifier
