= Simplex signaling =

Simplex signaling (SX) is signaling in which two conductors are used for a single telecommunication circuit, and a center-tapped coil, or its equivalent, is used to split the signaling current equally between the two conductors. The return path for the current is through ground.

It is distinct from a phantom circuit in which the return current path for power or signaling is provided through different signal conductors. SX signaling may be one-way, for intra-central-office use, or the simplex legs may be connected to form full-duplex signaling circuits that function like composite (CX) signaling circuits with E&M lead control.

Simplex is also used to describe a powering method where one or more signal conductors carries direct current to power a remote device, which sends its output signal back on the same conductor. Phantom powering as used in audio is a form of simplex powering, as the return current flows through the ground or shield conductor.
