= Mult box =

Box with multiple outputs of a single audio source

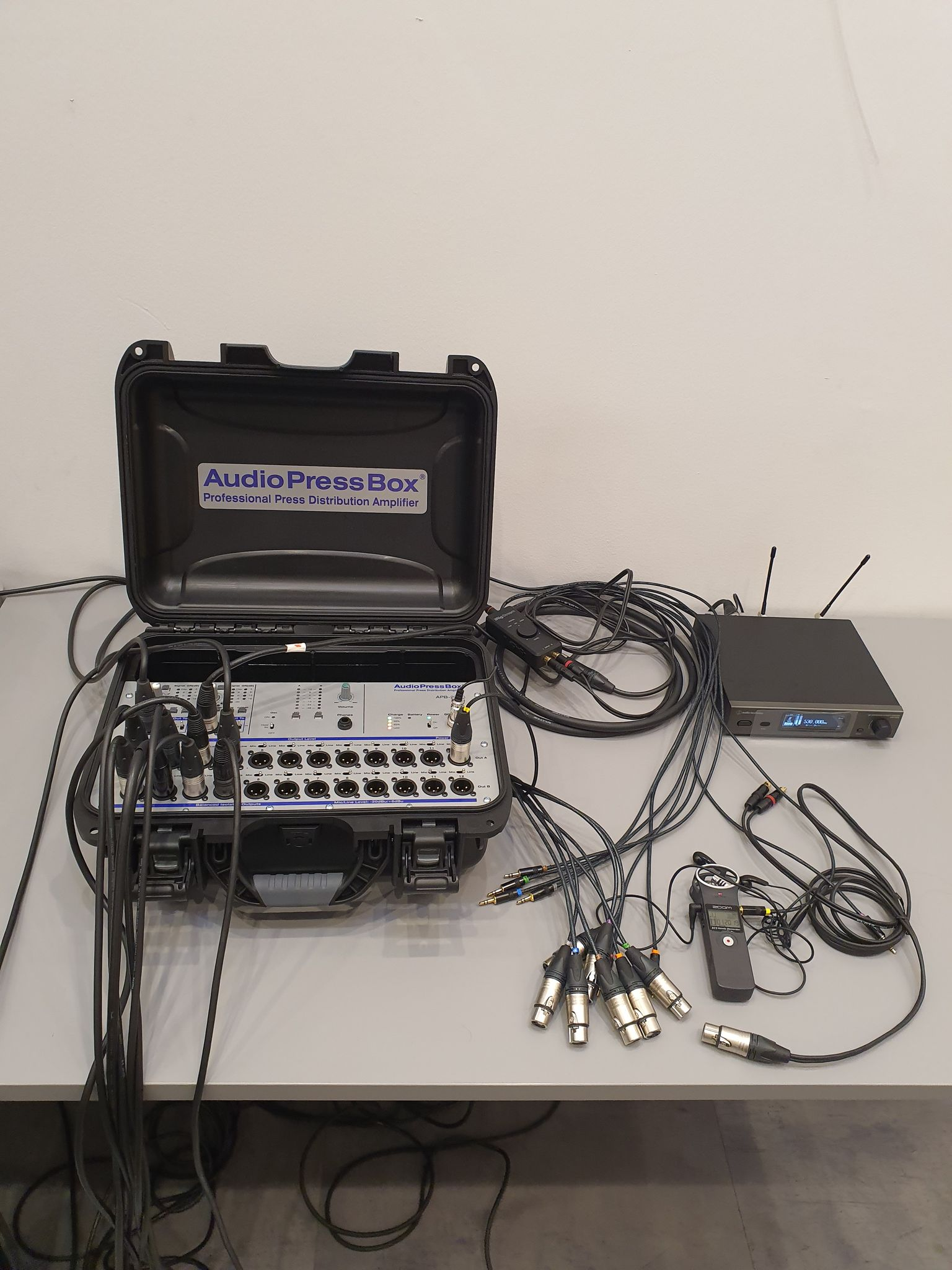
AudioPressBox APB-224 C

A mult box is a device that allows a single audio source, such as a microphone, to be shared with multiple outputs for recording or broadcast. A mult box is sometimes called a press box, but that term is usually reserved for the sports media's section of an arena. It may also be called a press mult box or press bridge. The sound engineer connects several microphones to allow all of them to get clean, high-quality audio.

Reporters use a mult box frequently at press conferences, especially when politicians give such interviews in small spaces, where not all the reporters in a press pool can access the interviewee.

== Rules ==
A whole set of etiquette and mores has developed amongst journalists governing the use of mult boxes. Because it is often difficult to get a good sound recording from a digital recorder for later broadcast or transcription for newspaper reporting, journalists have developed informal rules for their use. For example, the media should treat the sound engineer well, because while reporters can be selfish and competitive with each other, and the equipment can go wrong in many ways, the engineer allows all of them to get a good signal. It is also extremely important to show up early at press conferences as this allows one to test equipment, to avoid problems caused by the chaos of most press conferences, and to work cooperatively with the engineer.

The NCAA has a specific, written policy on the use of mult boxes for all NCAA championships.

== Availability ==
United States government agencies usually provide a mult box for media use at press conferences. However, they are not always consistent; the United States Department of Energy sometimes makes a mult box available, but then does not make a "media avail with speakers"; yet at other times does not allow a mult box but follows it up with a "press availability". Some state government agencies or courts also may provide such equipment for free to media, but charge a fee to rent it for private events held on state property.

Some colleges and universities provide the use of a mult box gratis to media who need it to record large academic events such as commencement, speaker, or funeral, but charge for leasing to certain organizations. Larger houses of worship, such as a basilica or cathedral, may provide a mult box for certain religious services, but not others, depending on their policies and the nature of the mass or eucharist. Large media events, such as the Grammy Awards, Alamo Bowl, etc., often provide a mult box for media at their press conferences as a convenience.

== Installation ==
A mult box can be an expensive piece of audio-visual equipment to purchase, so many organizations rent them from a communications company or government agency. Larger venues may make them available to the media for free, but rent them to private parties.

In 2011, the United States Mission to the African Union donated a state-of-the-art mult box to the cash-starved African Union in a formal ceremony, in which they also presented new interns who will be trained to use it.

== See also ==
- Communication design
- Media studies
- Sound recording and reproduction
