= Bootleg games =

Term for unofficial video games

Screenshot of Somari, a bootleg game based on the Sonic the Hedgehog and Super Mario series

In video game parlance, bootleg is a term widely used with varying range of usage, including but not limited to pirated games, multicarts, asset flips, romhacks, modifications marketed as full games, unauthorized reproductions, unlicensed titles, unofficial ports and demakes, plug and plays, video game clones and any titles that use copyrighted materials without a license or permission. They have garnered wide attention in the gaming community, often infamy, with seemingly bizarre choices in game design, poor graphics and glitches, mistranslations and blatant disregard for copyright, but have also garnered a cult following with appreciation given towards their creativity, the creation of increased gaming accessibility in the developing world, the pushing of hardware limits, the use of what limited resources the developers often had available, their influence on official titles and their wider place in video game history.
