= Bootleg ground =

Illegal connection of ground and neutral conductors

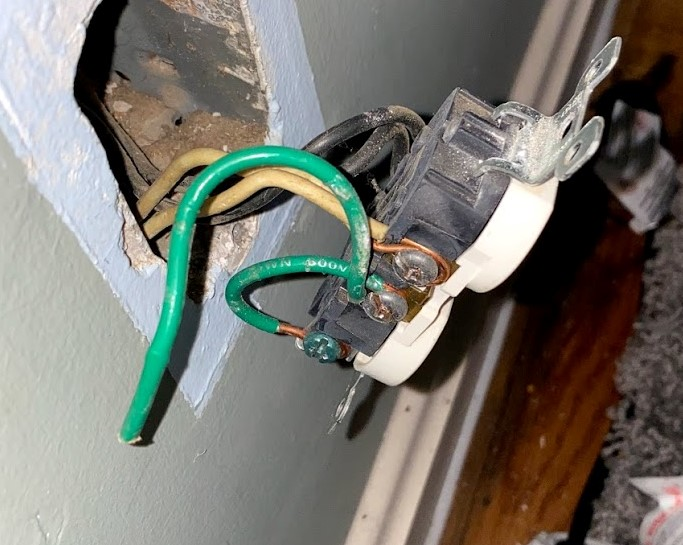
A receptacle with a bootleg ground

In building wiring installed with separate neutral and protective ground bonding conductors (a TN-S or TN-C-S network), a bootleg ground (or a false ground) is a connection between the neutral side of a receptacle or light fixture and the ground lug or enclosure of the wiring device.

== Description ==
A bootleg ground connects the neutral side of the receptacle to the conductive casing of an appliance or lamp. This can be a hazard because the neutral wire is a current-carrying conductor, which means the exposed casing can become energized. In addition, a fault condition to a bootleg ground will not trip a GFCI breaker, nor protect a receptacle that is wired from the load side of a GFCI receptacle.

Before 1996, in the United States it was common to ground the frames of large 120/240-volt permanently-connected appliances (such as a clothes dryer or oven) to neutral conductors. This has been prohibited in new installations since the 1996 National Electrical Code (upon local adoption by legislation or regulation). Existing installations are permitted to continue in accordance with NEC 250.140 Exception.

=== Correct-polarity bootleg ground ===
In the less-dangerous instance of a bootleg ground, a short wire jumper is connected between the bonding screw terminal (usually colored green) on a NEMA 5-15R or 5-20R outlet to the neutral (a.k.a. grounded conductor, colored white according to code) or directly to the white neutral wire via a pigtail. This practice is a NEC code violation, but a standard 3-lamp receptacle tester will report the outlet as correctly wired. The danger comes from the possibility of the neutral becoming energized due to an interruption in the wiring.

=== Reverse-polarity bootleg ground ===
In the very-dangerous instance of a reverse polarity bootleg ground, the hot and neutral wires have been connected to the opposite terminals, and a jumper or pigtail connection is made between the green bonding screw terminal and what is believed to be the neutral circuit. But because the wiring has been crossed at some point, the hot 120-volt wire is now connected directly to the ground on the receptacle, placing low-impedance live voltage on all grounded parts of all equipment plugged into that outlet. This hazardous connection allows people to come into contact with a deadly voltage with a current path back to the source (the power transformer) that will not trip either a normal circuit breaker, a GFCI, nor an AFCI quickly enough to prevent electrocution.

== Safer alternatives ==
If a safe equipment ground path is not provided via the existing cables installed within the building, they ideally should be replaced with new cabling which includes a safety ground conductor.

A safe alternative (where local electrical code allows it), permitted by recent editions of the National Electrical Code [NEC Sec. 406.4(D)(2)(b)] if a grounding connection is not practicable, is to install a GFCI and leave the grounding terminal screw unconnected. This is permitted if a permanent label is installed that says "No Equipment Ground" on the GFCI, and a label that states “GFCI Protected” and “No Equipment Ground” is placed on all downstream receptacles.

== Other countries ==
West Germany banned bootleg grounding in 1973, although it was common practice before and can still be found in older installations.

In Finland, using neutral as a ground conductor was a common practice until 1989. After that, a thicker PEN-wire was used as both ground and neutral until it was banned in 2007.

== See also ==
- Earthing System
- Electrical wiring in North America
- Ground and neutral
