= Ground lift =

Noise reduction technique

In sound recording and reproduction, ground lift or earth lift is a technique used to reduce or eliminate ground-related noise arising from ground loops in audio cables. It may also increase or decrease noise from other sources. Activating the ground lift on a particular piece of equipment opens the connection between the equipment ground and the shielding conductor of audio cables attached to the equipment, leaving those cables grounded only at their opposite end.

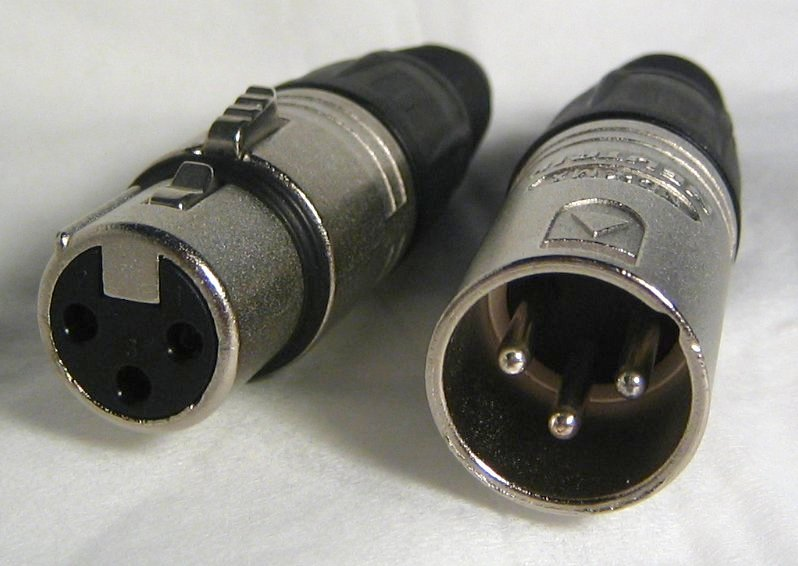
XLR connectors used for audio

If all pieces of equipment are tied to a common ground reference without establishing ground loop, no current flows in the ground conductors and cable shields, and no noise is introduced into signal circuits. In applications such as sound reinforcement for a concert, however, it is difficult to ensure all equipment shares a common ground reference.

== Ground lift switch ==
Professional audio equipment intended for use with balanced lines may have a ground lift switch for the cable shield. The ground lift switch eliminates unwanted hum and buzz by interrupting the ground loops between equipment, preventing current flow along the cable shield between two devices. The switch disconnects pin 1 on the XLR jack, which is connected to the braid or foil shield in the cable and acts as the ground point of the circuit.

Ground lifts do not conform to Audio Engineering Society standard AES48.

== Other ways of isolating the cable shield ==
Specially wired signal adaptors may leave the shield connection disconnected, or connected to safety ground through an RF bypass capacitor. Isolation transformers may be used to convert from balanced lines to single-ended inputs, and also to isolate the cable shield from the equipment safety ground.

== Safety ==
Removal of the safety ground connection on equipment can expose users to an increased danger of electric shock and may contradict wiring regulations. The safety ground is disconnected by an adaptor (cheater plug) in a power lead in which the ground conductor is deliberately disconnected, or by cutting a ground pin in the power plug. If a fault develops in any line-operated equipment, cable shields and equipment enclosures may become energized, creating an electric shock hazard. For example, the metal shell of a stage microphone or the strings of a guitar may become energized, creating a hazard to performers. British musicians Leslie Harvey and Keith Relf were, in the 1970s, examples of this type of electrocution, in both cases fatal. Many other musicians have experienced electric shock due to ungrounded or improperly grounded equipment with less severe consequences.

== See also ==
- Electromagnetic compatibility
