= Utility box =

Utility box may refer to:

- A toolbox
- Pattress, a box that houses electrical sockets, switches, or other fixtures, also known as an electrical box
  - Junction box, a box that houses electrical connections
- Electrical enclosure, a cabinet-sized box housing electrical equipment or connectors
  - Pad-mounted transformer
