= Electrium =

German-owned British manufacturer of electrical wiring equipment

- Type: Private limited company
- Industry: Electrical engineering
- Founded: 1897; 129 years ago
- Headquarters: Cannock, West Midlands, United Kingdom
- Key people: Robin Grosse, Managing Director
- Parent: Siemens
- Website: www.electrium.co.uk

Electrium is a German-owned British manufacturer of electrical wiring accessories, circuit protection, cable management, and control equipment.

Electrium has two sites across the UK as of 2025: the old main factory in Wythenshawe, Manchester closed in 2024, leaving only the distribution center at Hindley Green, Wigan, and the head office at Cannock, West Midlands.

== History ==
The company has its origins in George H. Scholes Ltd. which was founded in 1897 by George Hamer Scholes to manufacture electrical accessories and fuse boxes. It was re-organised into two businesses (i) Wylex and (ii) Appleby in 1988. Wylex Limited was acquired by Hanson Trust in 1994 and changed its name to Electrium Sales Limited in April 2001. After Hanson Trust decided to focus on building materials, it was the subject of a management buyout financed by Lloyds TSB Development Capital in December 2003. It was then bought by Siemens in January 2006.

== Brand names ==
=== Siemens ===
After the takeover of Electrium Sales Ltd by Siemens AG in 2005, Electrium began to manufacture and distribute Siemens branded circuit protection and electrical equipment.

=== Crabtree ===
J. A. Crabtree & Co was founded in 1919 by John Ashworth Crabtree. The company became one of Britain's leading manufacturers of electrical accessories, low voltage switchgear and motor control gear. In 1972, the company was acquired by the British Ever Ready Electrical Company, which was itself acquired by Hanson Trust in 1981. For many years the company was based at the Lincoln Works in Walsall, Staffordshire, which was closed in 1997. The business was acquired by Electrium in 2006.

=== Volex ===
Ward & Goldstone Ltd., later known as Volex plc, was founded in 1892 by James Henry Ward and Meyer Hart Goldstone. That company's Volex Accessories business, involving switches and sockets for the building trade, was acquired by Wylex in 1991.

=== Wylex ===
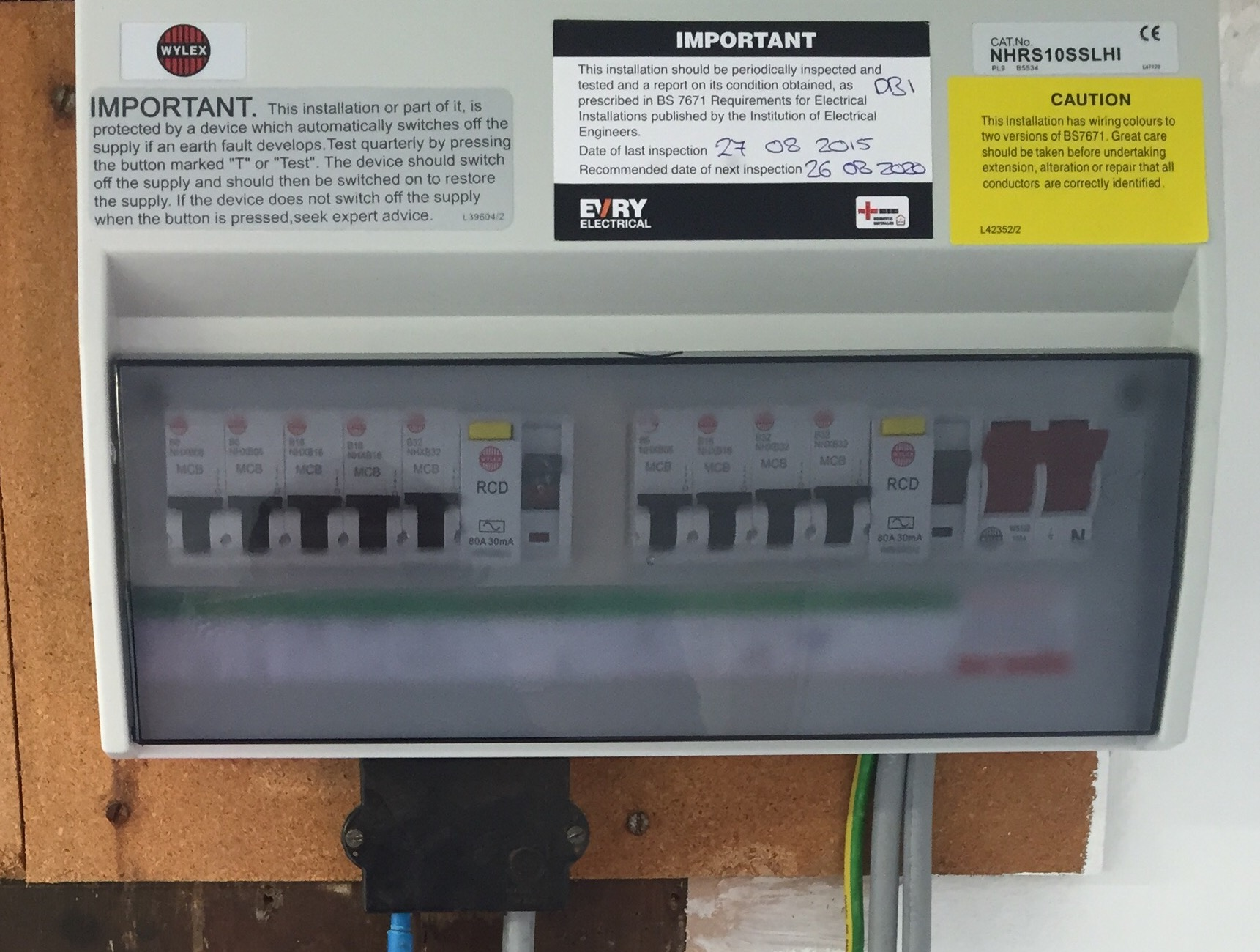
Typical Wylex Consumer Unit.

George H. Scholes Ltd. was founded in 1897 by George Hamer Scholes to manufacture electrical accessories and fuse boxes. In 1934, he built the Wylex Works at Wythenshawe, near Manchester. The company's Wylex brand consumer units still dominate the UK market.

=== Appleby ===
H. & L. Appleby Ltd. was founded in 1840. The company's factory was in Short Heath, Willenhall, Staffordshire. The company, which makes a range of pattress boxes, dry lining boxes and bulkhead light fittings, was acquired by George H. Scholes and Co. in 1988.

=== Marbo ===
Marbourn Ltd. was a British manufacturer of electrical accessories, based in the North East of England. The company closed its factory in Hartlepool in 2000.
