= Junction box =

Enclosure housing electrical connections

An electrical junction box (also known as a "jbox") is an enclosure housing electrical connections. Junction boxes protect the electrical connections from the weather, also playing a crucial role in protecting people from accidental electric shocks.

== Functions of the junction box ==
A small metal, plastic or fibreglass junction box may form part of an electrical conduit or thermoplastic-sheathed cable (TPS) wiring system in a building. If designed for surface mounting, it is used mostly in ceilings, concrete or concealed behind an access panel—particularly in domestic or commercial buildings. An appropriate type (such as that shown in the gallery) may be buried in the plaster of a wall (although full concealment is no longer allowed by modern codes and standards) or cast into concrete—with only the cover visible.

It sometimes includes built-in terminals for the joining of wires.

A similar, usually wall mounted, container used mainly to accommodate switches, sockets and the associated connecting wiring is called a pattress.

The term junction box may also be used for a larger item, such as a piece of street furniture. In the UK, such items are often called a cabinet. See Enclosure (electrical).

Junction boxes form an integral part of a circuit protection system where circuit integrity has to be provided, as for emergency lighting or emergency power lines, or the wiring between a nuclear reactor and a control room. In such an installation, the fireproofing around the incoming or outgoing cables must also be extended to cover the junction box to prevent short circuits inside the box during an accidental fire.

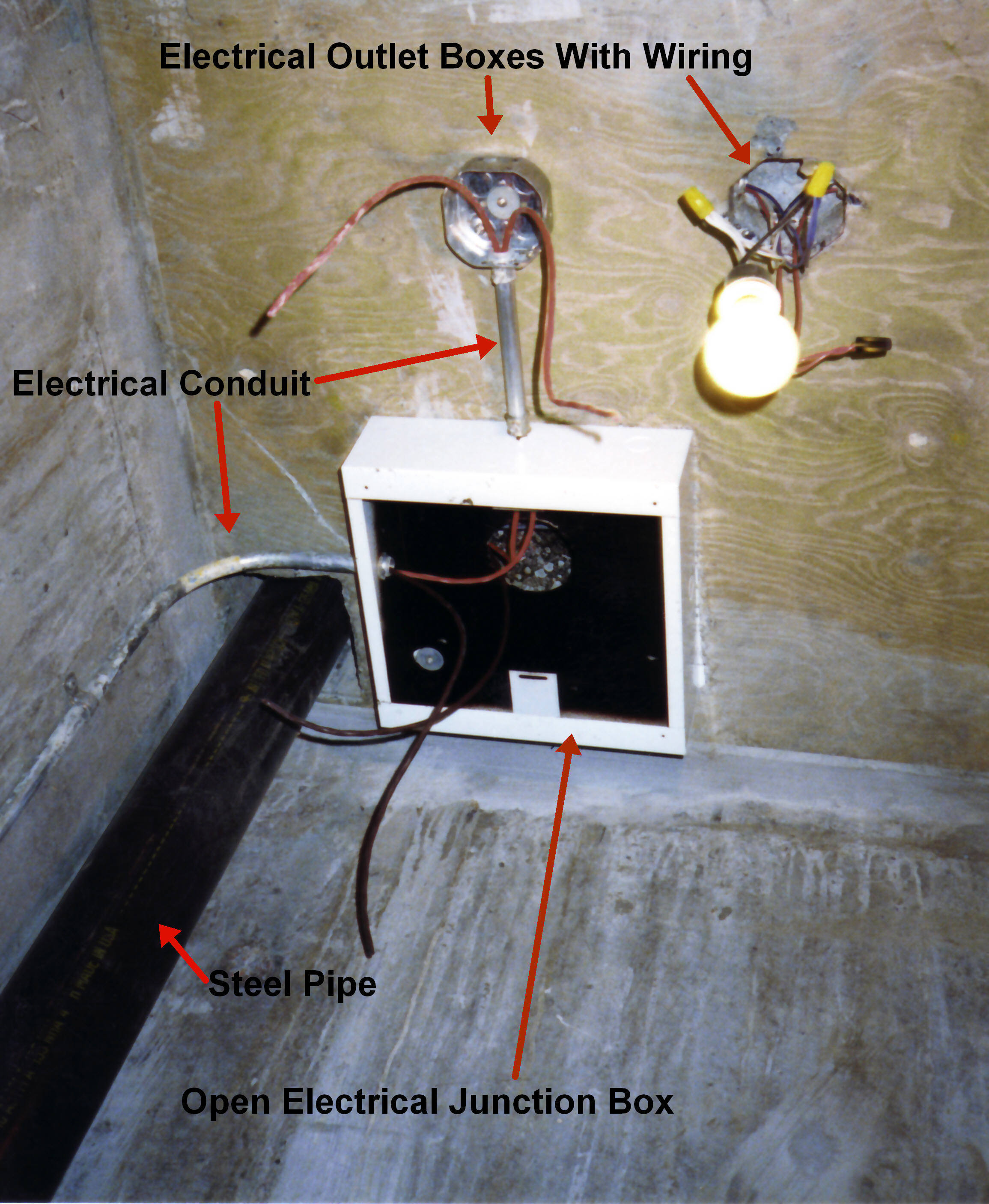
Electrical junction box in the process of installation. Electrical conduits terminate at the sides and cables pass through or are joined inside the box.

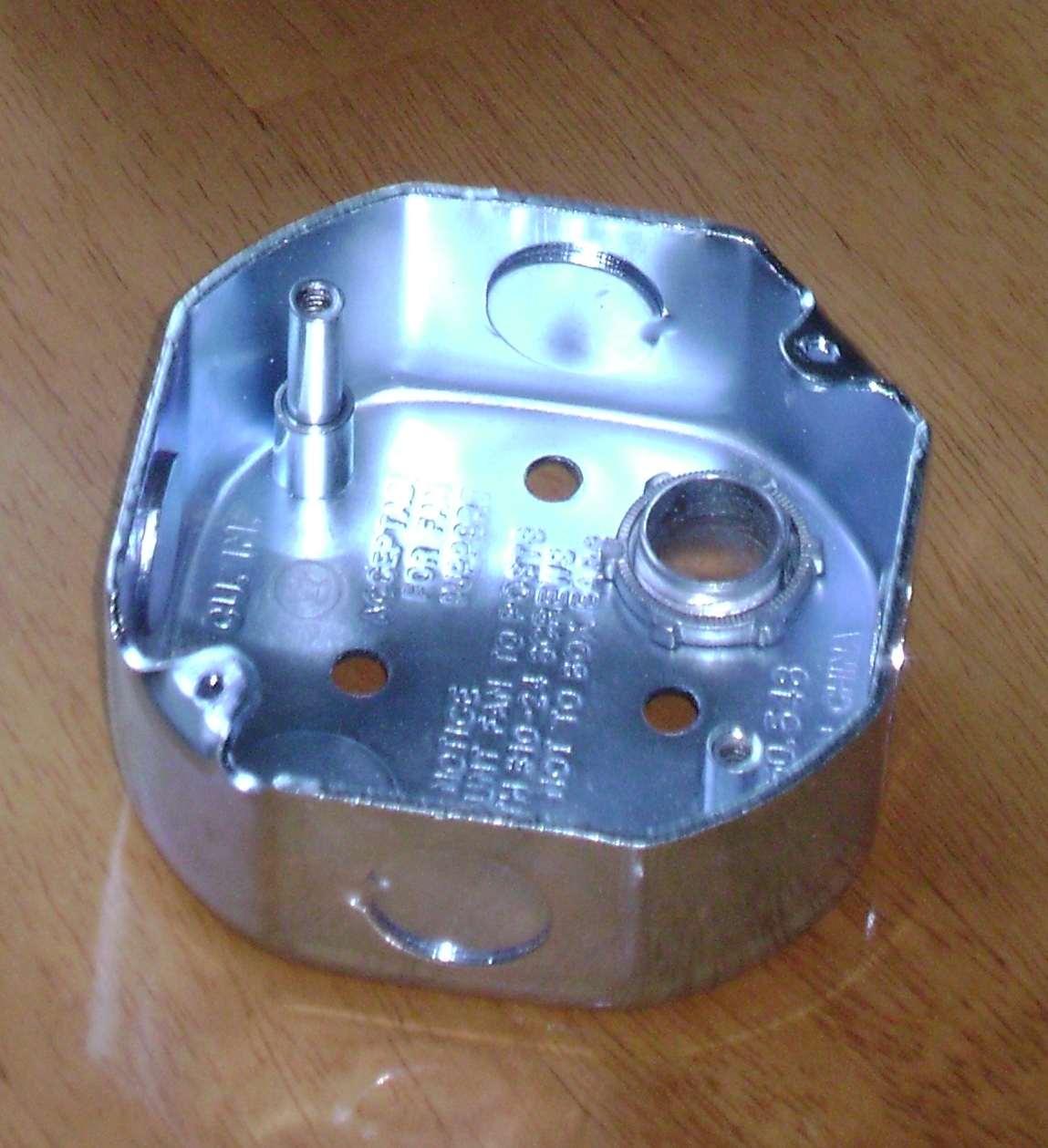
A metal junction box

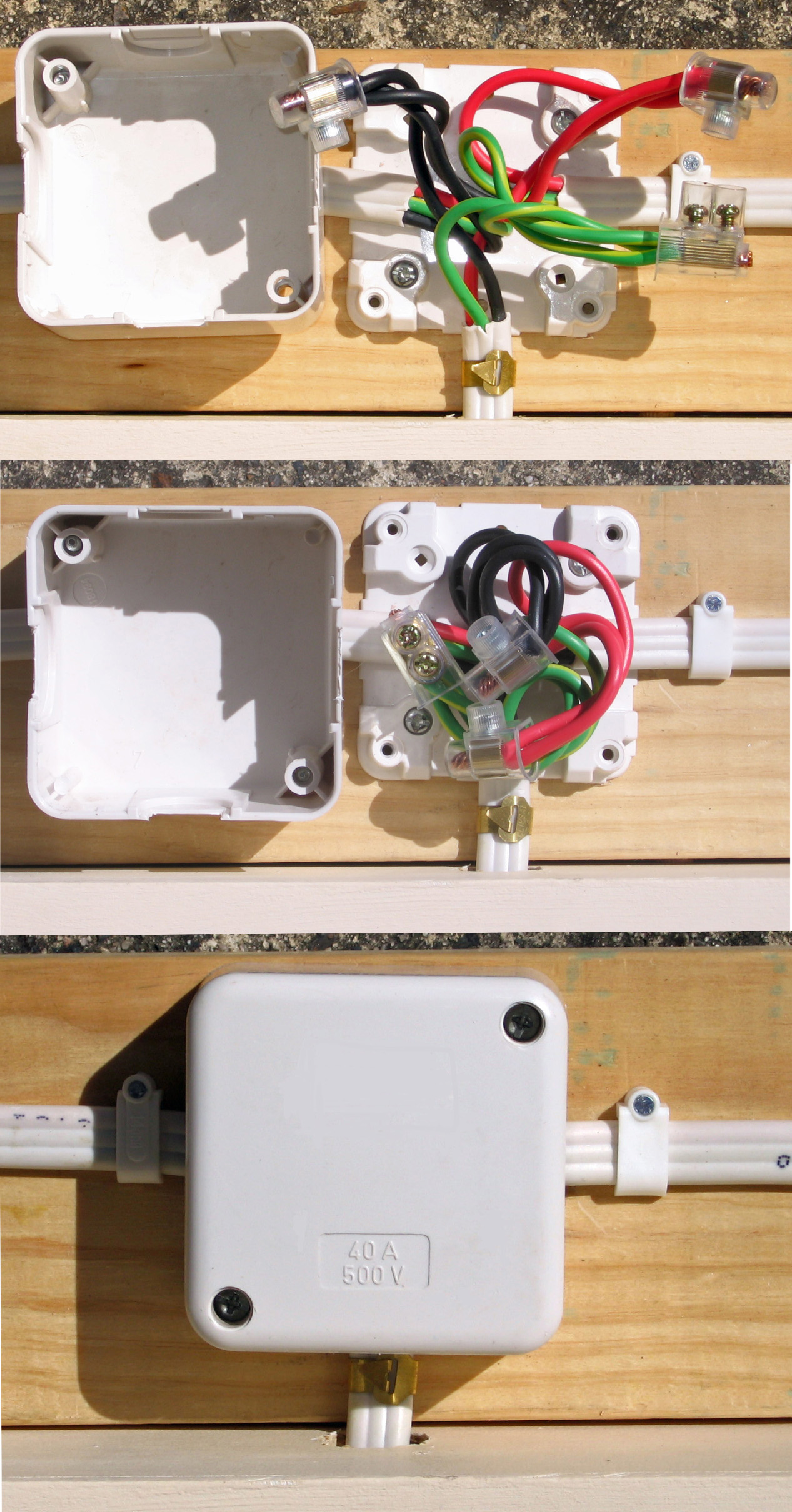
Australian Internal Surface Mounted Junction Box—showing wiring stages.

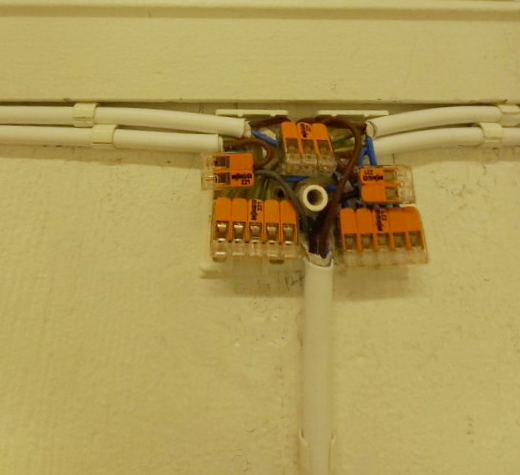
Swedish junction box in Kuhlo-style with lever-connector Wago 221, where ground and neutral are connected in common.

== See also ==
- Cable tray
- Centrex
- Circuit integrity
- Distribution board
- Electric power distribution
- Electrical wiring
- Grounding
- Insulation
- IP Code
- Passive fire protection
- Pattress
- Solar micro-inverter
