= Volex =

British Engineering business

Volex plc
- Type: Public
- Traded as: LSE: VLX; FTSE 250 Component
- Industry: Electrical engineering
- Founded: 1892; 134 years ago
- Founder: James Henry Ward and Meyer Hart Goldstone
- Headquarters: Basingstoke, Hampshire
- Key people: David Webster (chairman); Lord Rothschild (CEO)
- Products: Power and data cables
- Revenue: ▲£1,242.6 million (2026)
- Operating income: ▲£127.3 million (2026)
- Net income: ▲£67.3 million (2026)
- Website: www.volex.com

Volex plc is an electrical engineering company, making power and data cables and headquartered in Basingstoke, Hampshire, England. It is listed on the London Stock Exchange and is a constituent of the FTSE 250 Index.

== History ==
Factory in Poland

The company was founded by James Henry Ward and Meyer Hart Goldstone in Gorton as Ward & Goldstone in 1892. The company experienced strikes at 12 of its factories in 1975 and then got into financial difficulties in the early 1980s.

It changed its name to Volex Group in October 1984, and closed its main factory in Frederick Road in Salford in 1986. Then in 1991, the company sold its accessories division, making switches and sockets for the building industry, to Wylex, which changed its name to Electrium Sales in April 2001. By the early 21st century, manufacturing facilities were operating in China, Mexico and Poland.

In 2009, NR Investments, a company controlled by Lord Rothschild, became the largest shareholder with 26.5% of the shares. As part of a recovery plan, Lord Rothschild became CEO in November 2015. The company then relocated to Basingstoke in March 2020.

The company bought a Turkish business, De-Ka Elektroteknik Sanayi ve Ticaret Anonim Şirketi (DE-KA), for €61.8 million in late 2020, and then bought another Turkish business, Murat Ticaret, for £135 million in June 2023. In October 2023, the company was targeted by hackers.

The company transferred from the Alternative Investment Market to the main market of the London Stock Exchange in July 2026. In another large acquisition, the company acquired all the shares in did not already own in a medical equipment business, Kepler SignalTek (KST), for $89.4 million in July 2026.
