= CPN Cudis =

- Founded: 2004 in Bury, Greater Manchester, England
- Founder: Toni Hankins
- Headquarters: Bury, England
- Area served: Worldwide
- Products: Consumer Units, Distribution Boards
- Services: Electrical Component Supplier
- Number of employees: 25
- Website: http://www.cudis.co.uk

CPN Cudis is a British provider of electrical circuit protection components, such as distribution boards and consumer units. The business was founded in 2004.

The company's headquarters is in Bury, Greater Manchester, and employs approximately 20 staff.

CPN Cudis supply customers worldwide, but mainly operate in the UK and Europe. Their range of products includes consumer units, 3-phase distribution boards, surge protection devices, control gears, rotary isolators, auxiliaries, DOL starters and surge protection units.

== 'Lumo' consumer unit ==
In October 2013, CPN Cudis released an LED consumer unit named 'Lumo'. The Lumo is made up of an industry standard certified consumer unit, but with the addition of a strip of LED lamps which are illuminated automatically when the cover of the unit is opened.

The Lumo is activated by a micro-switch and is powered by a standard battery. It is available currently in three sizes up to 22 ways. The unit was designed to solve the problem of having consumer units in darker locations, such as under stairs, and also to help aid those with vision problems, such as the elderly.

The Lumo was 'highly commended' at the 2013 Electrical Industry Awards it was very sadly discontinued in 2023.

== Awards and nominations ==
The Electrical Industry Awards

Year	Product/Project	Award	Result
2013	Lumo Consumer Unit	Innovative Residential / Domestic Product of The Year	2nd Place / Highly Commended

'Made in Bury' Business Awards

Year	Product/Project	Award	Result
2014	Lumo Consumer Unit	Best in Class Award - Technology	Shortlisted

== Sponsorships ==
CPN Cudis and its sister company Rowe Hankins sponsored Bury Football Club for the 2014/2015 season.

CPN Cudis have sponsored Potton United FC since the 2017/2018 season.
