= Circuit total limitation =

Present-day standards for electrical panels

Circuit total limitation (CTL) is a legacy standard for electrical panels sold in the United States according to the National Electrical Code. This standard requires an electrical panel to provide a physical mechanism to prevent installing more circuit breakers than it was designed for. This has generally been implemented by restricting the use of tandem (duplex) breakers to replace standard single pole breakers. This was seen as preventing wire overload in smaller panels, but is not a method to prevent electrical overload (any size breaker can still go in a CTL limited panel).

== Code Requirement ==
The 1965 edition of the NEC, article 384-15 was the first reference to the circuit total limitation of panelboards. As of 2008, the location of this language is at Article 408.54 now titled "Maximum Number of Overcurrent Devices.". However, this rule never prevented panel overloads, as any ampacity breaker can be used in any slot. The rule was repealed in 2008.

== Non-CTL for replacement only ==
Circuitboards and panelboards built prior to 1965 did not have circuit total limiting devices or features built-in. To support these old panels, non-CTL circuit breakers that bypass the rejection feature are still sold "for replacement use only." As a result, numerous unsafe situations have resulted where panels were dangerously overloaded because these non-CTL breakers continue to be used. With the use of non-CTL breakers, panels can be configured with the total number of circuits in excess of the designed capacity of that panel.

The 2008 code did away with the previous 42 circuit limitation on panelboards. One can now order panelboards with as many as 84 circuit places, and a corresponding ampacity rating. If a panelboard with a sufficient number of breaker positions is installed in the first place, the need for non-CTL breakers should be eliminated.

== Eaton Bryant Cutler-Hammer ==
Eaton CTL breakers add a small metal clip on the back of the breaker, which prevents insertion in non-notched bus stabs. From 2019 or so new Eaton panels have only un-notched bus stabs, rendering the CTL breaker types obsolete. Eaton has long made both types, but attached a price premium to the more flexible Non-CTL breakers:

| BD | CTL | Single width, two independent breakers |
| BQ | CTL | Double width, three independent breakers |
| BQC | CTL | Double width, two common trip circuits |
| BR | Non-CTL | Various types |
| BRD | Non-CTL | Various types, all BR compatible |
| BRDC | Non-CTL | Double width, two common trip circuits |

While it is physically possible to remove the Eaton clip, this violates the listing, and could result in fragments of plastic or metal entering the breaker and preventing proper operation.

In their 2019 catalog Eaton specifies that their non-CTL breakers are "Suitable for use in plug-on neutral style loadcenters which negates the replacement only rule. Eaton then further announced it would remove the rejection clip from all breakers, as they have discontinued notched bus stabs across the product line.

== Siemens ==
Siemens uses a similar rejection clip to Eaton, but adds an additional plastic extension to back up the clip. Non-CTL clip free breakers have the "NC" suffix. As with Eaton the selling price is higher to discourage use.

== Square D Fuses ==
A non-removable rejection clip, model RFK06, can be fitted to reject non-R fuses.

== Gallery ==
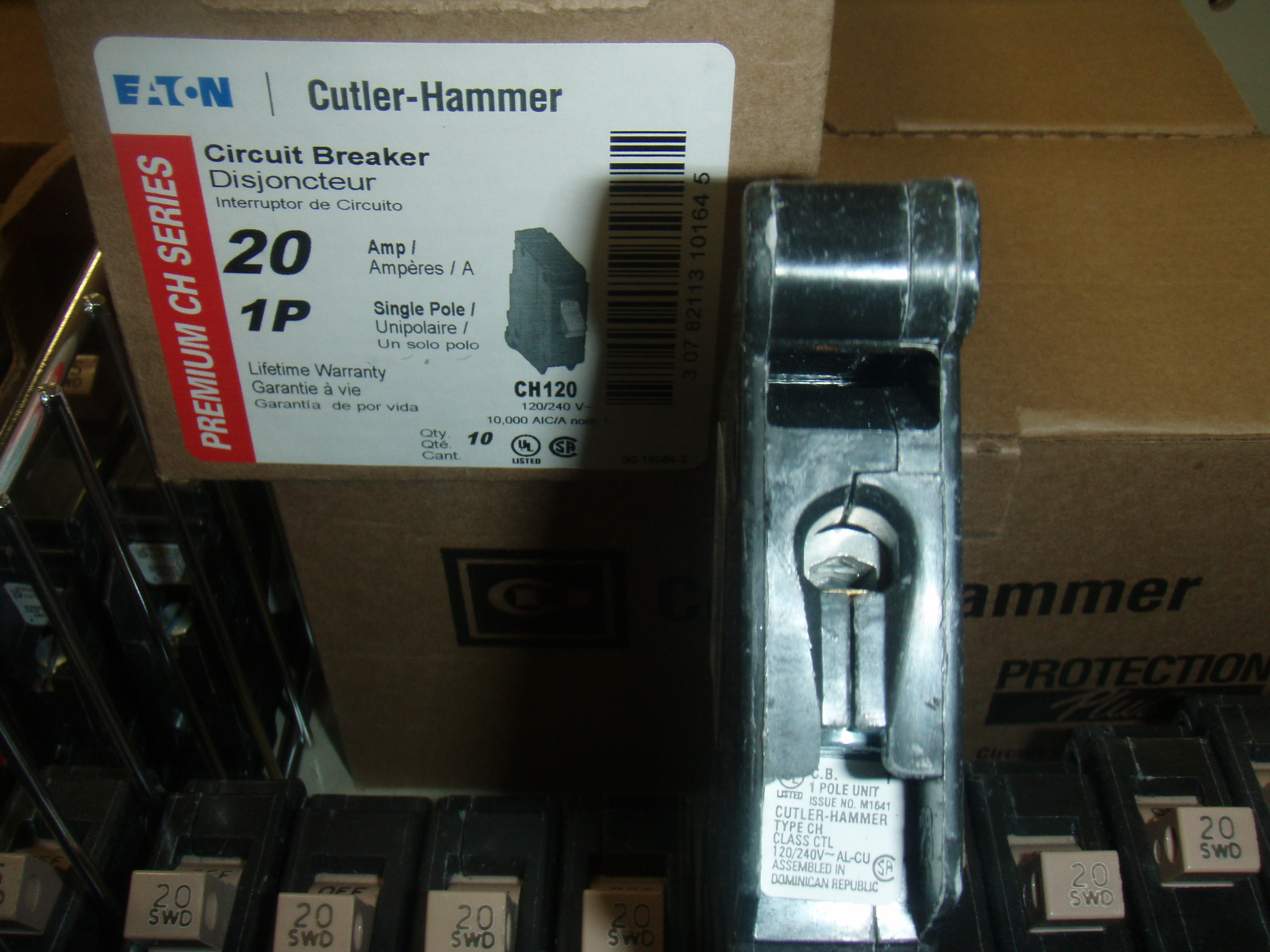
Cutler-Hammer ONE pole CTL circuit breaker

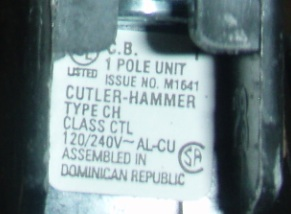
Cutler-Hammer ONE pole CTL Circuit Breaker close-up

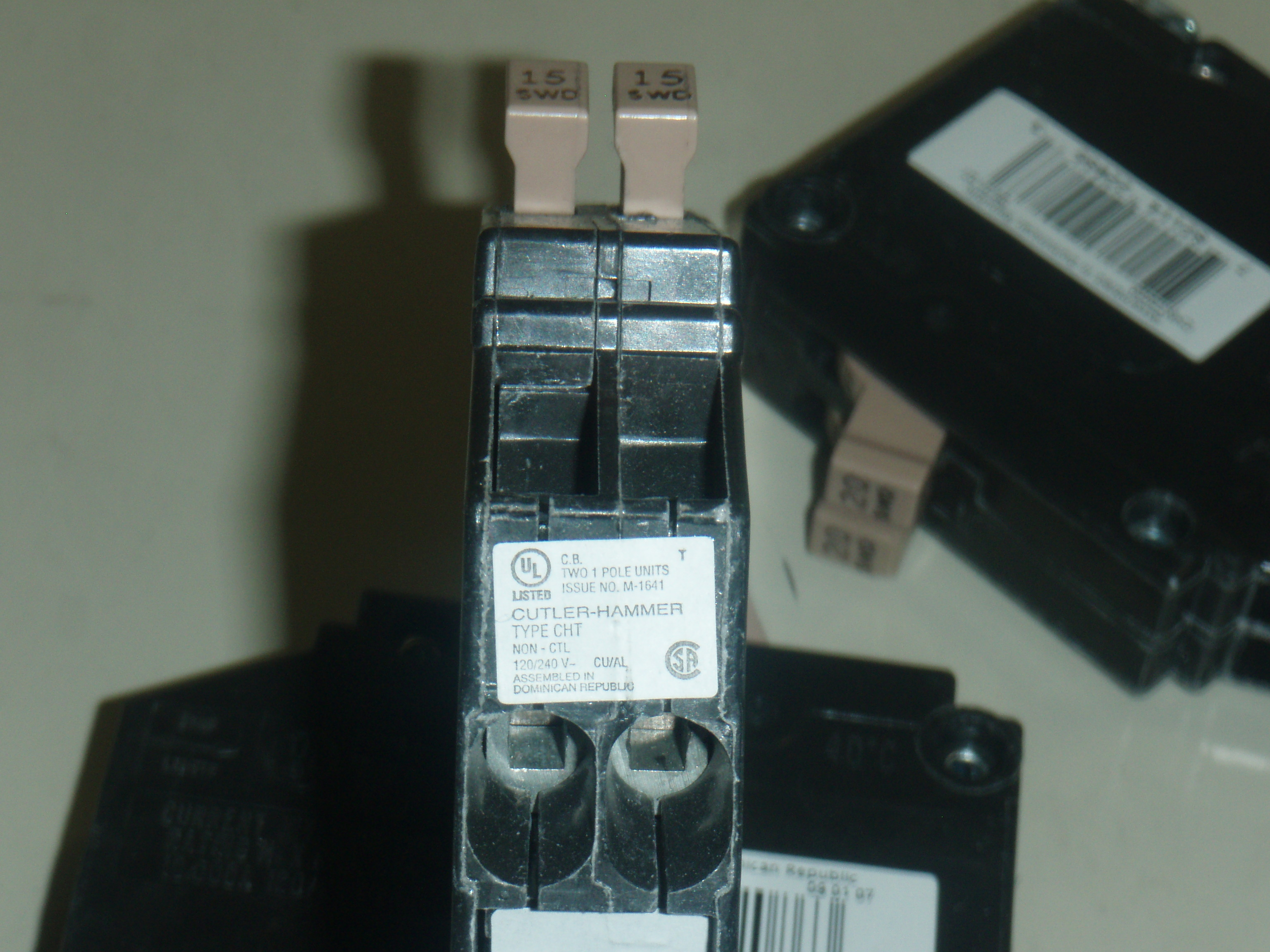
Cutler-Hammer CHEATER or Non-CTL Circuit Breaker

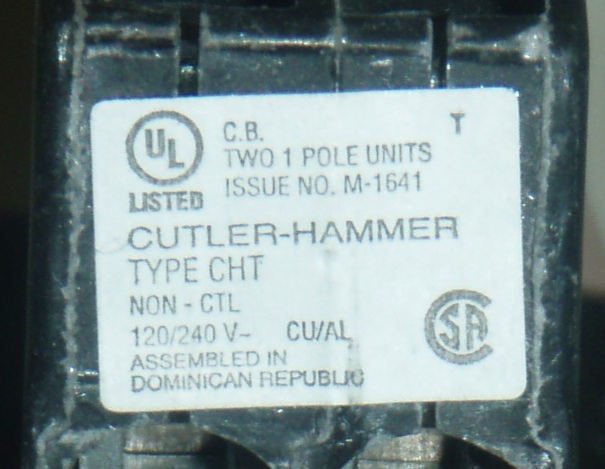
Cutler-Hammer CHEATER or Non-CTL Circuit Breaker

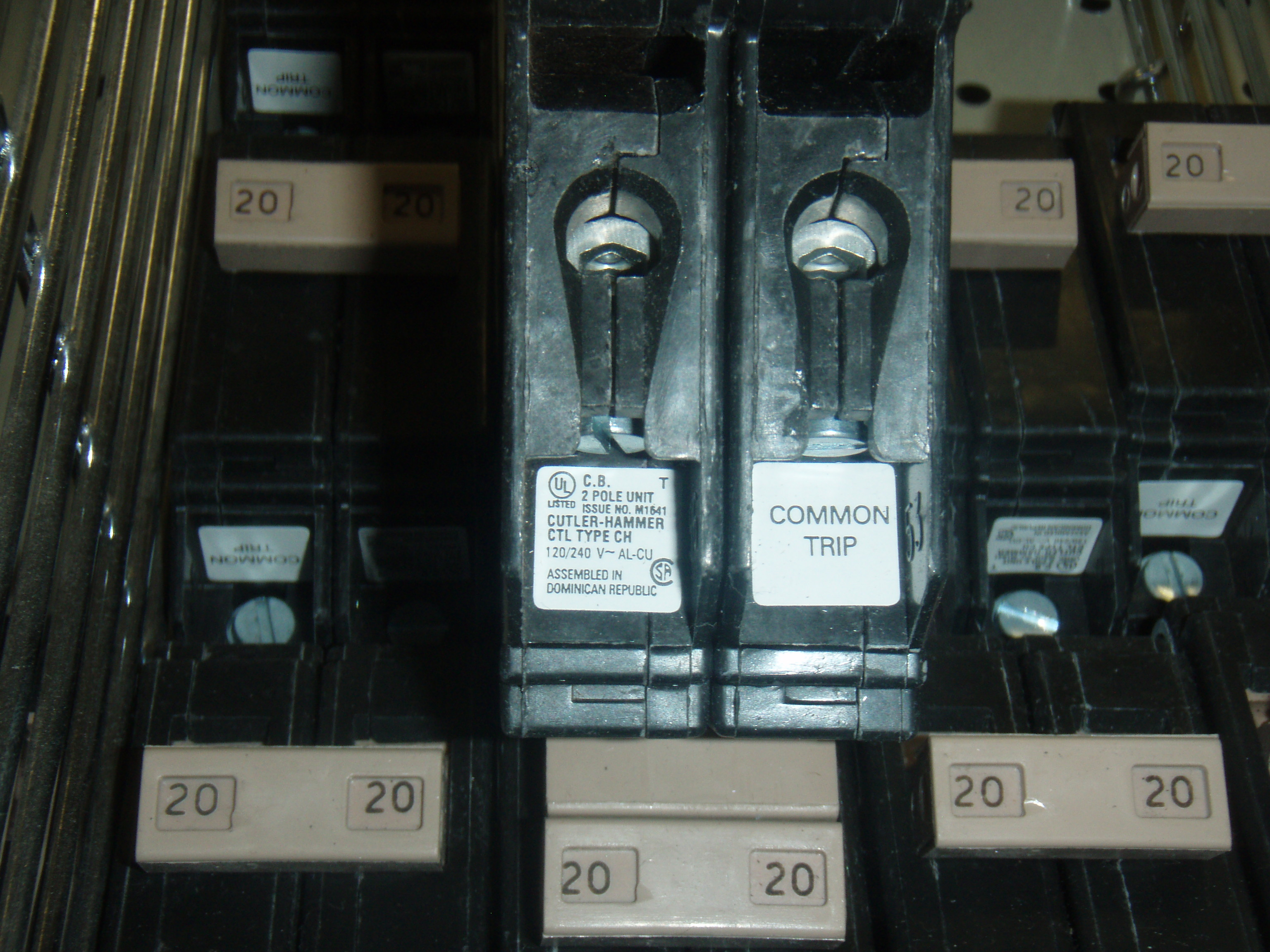
Cutler-Hammer TWO pole CTL Circuit Breaker

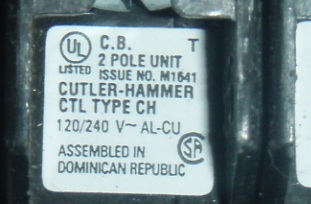
Cutler-Hammer TWO pole CTL Circuit Breaker

== See also ==
- National Electrical Code
