= Distribution board =

Component of an electricity supply system housing fuses

A distribution board (also known as a panelboard, circuit breaker panel or box, electric panel, fuse box or DB box) is a component of an electricity supply system that divides an electrical power feed into subsidiary circuits while providing a protective fuse or circuit breaker for each circuit in a common enclosure. Normally, a main switch, and in recent boards, one or more residual-current devices (RCDs) or residual current breakers with overcurrent protection (RCBOs) are also incorporated.

In the United Kingdom, a distribution board designed for domestic installations is known as a consumer unit.

== North America ==
North American distribution boards are generally housed in sheet metal enclosures, with the circuit breakers positioned in two columns operable from the front. Some panelboards are provided with a door covering the breaker switch handles, but all are constructed with a dead front; that is to say the front of the enclosure (whether it has a door or not) prevents the operator of the circuit breakers from contacting live electrical parts within. Busbars carry the current from incoming line (hot) conductors to the breakers, which are secured to the bus with either a bolt-on connection (using a threaded screw) or a plug-in connection using a retaining clip. Panelboards are more common in commercial and industrial applications and employ bolt-on breakers. Residential and light commercial panels are generally referred to as load centers and employ plug-in breakers. The neutral conductors are secured to a neutral bus using screw terminals. The branch circuit bonding conductors are secured to a terminal block attached directly to the panelboard enclosure, which is itself grounded.

During servicing of the distribution board, when the cover has been removed and the cables are visible, American panelboards commonly have some live parts exposed. In Canadian service entrance panelboards the main switch or circuit breaker is located in a service box, a section of the enclosure separated from the rest of the panelboard, so that when the main switch or breaker is switched off no live parts are exposed when servicing the branch circuits.

=== Breaker arrangement ===
Breakers are usually arranged in two columns. In a U.S.-style board, breaker positions are numbered left-to-right, along each row from top to bottom. This numbering system is universal with numerous competitive manufacturers of breaker panels.

Each row is fed from a different line (A, B, and C below), to allow 2- or 3-pole common-trip breakers to have one pole on each phase. In North America, it is common to wire large permanently installed equipment line-to-line. This takes two slots in the panel (two-pole) and gives a voltage of 240 V for split-phase electric power, or 208 V for three-phase power.

North American breaker numbering
Split-phase	3-phase	Breakers	
A	A	1	2
B	B	3	4
A	C	5	6
B	A	7	8
A	B	9	10
B	C	11	12
⋮	⋮	⋮	⋮

==== Interior ====
The photograph to the right shows the interior of a residential service panelboard manufactured by General Electric. The three service conductors—two 'hot' lines and one neutral—can be seen coming in at the top. The neutral wire is connected to the neutral busbar to the left with all the white wires, and the two hot wires are attached to the main breaker. Below the main breaker are the two bus bars carrying the current between the main breaker and the two columns of branch circuit breakers, with each respective circuit's red and black hot wires leading off. Three wires (hot black, neutral white, and bare ground) can be seen exiting the left side of the enclosure running directly to a NEMA 5–15 electrical receptacle with a power cord plugged into it. The incoming bare, stranded ground wire can be seen near the bottom of the neutral bus bar.

The photograph on the left shows a dual panel configuration: a main panel on the right (with front cover in place) and a subpanel on the left (with cover removed). The subpanel is fed by two large hot wires and a neutral wire running through the angled conduit near the top of the panels. This configuration appears to display two violations of the current U.S. National Electrical Code: the main panel does not have a grounding conductor (here it is fed through the subpanel instead) and the subpanel neutral bar is bonded to the ground bar (these should be separate bars after the first service disconnect, which in this case is the main panel).

North American boxes

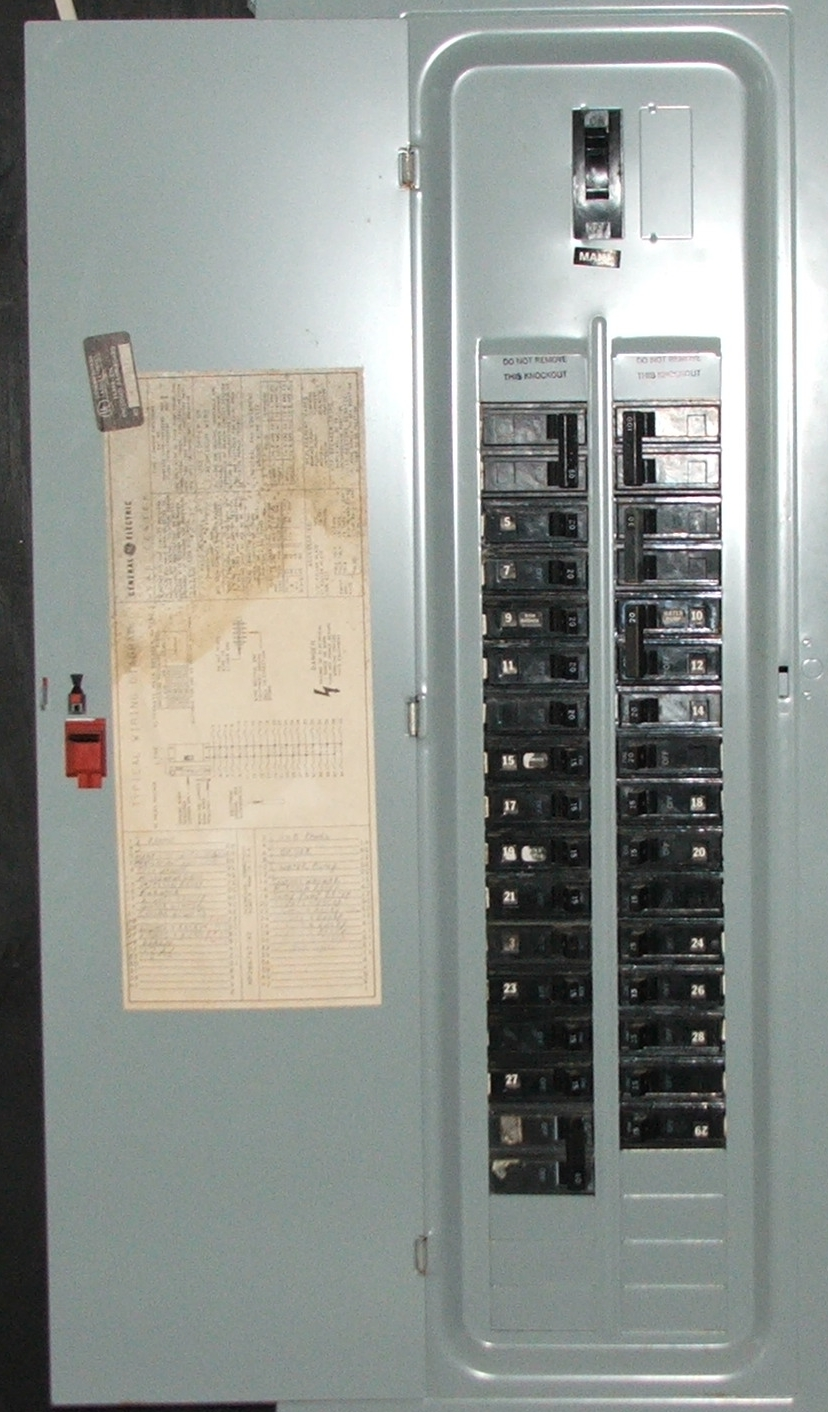
An American circuit breaker panel featuring interchangeable circuit breakers

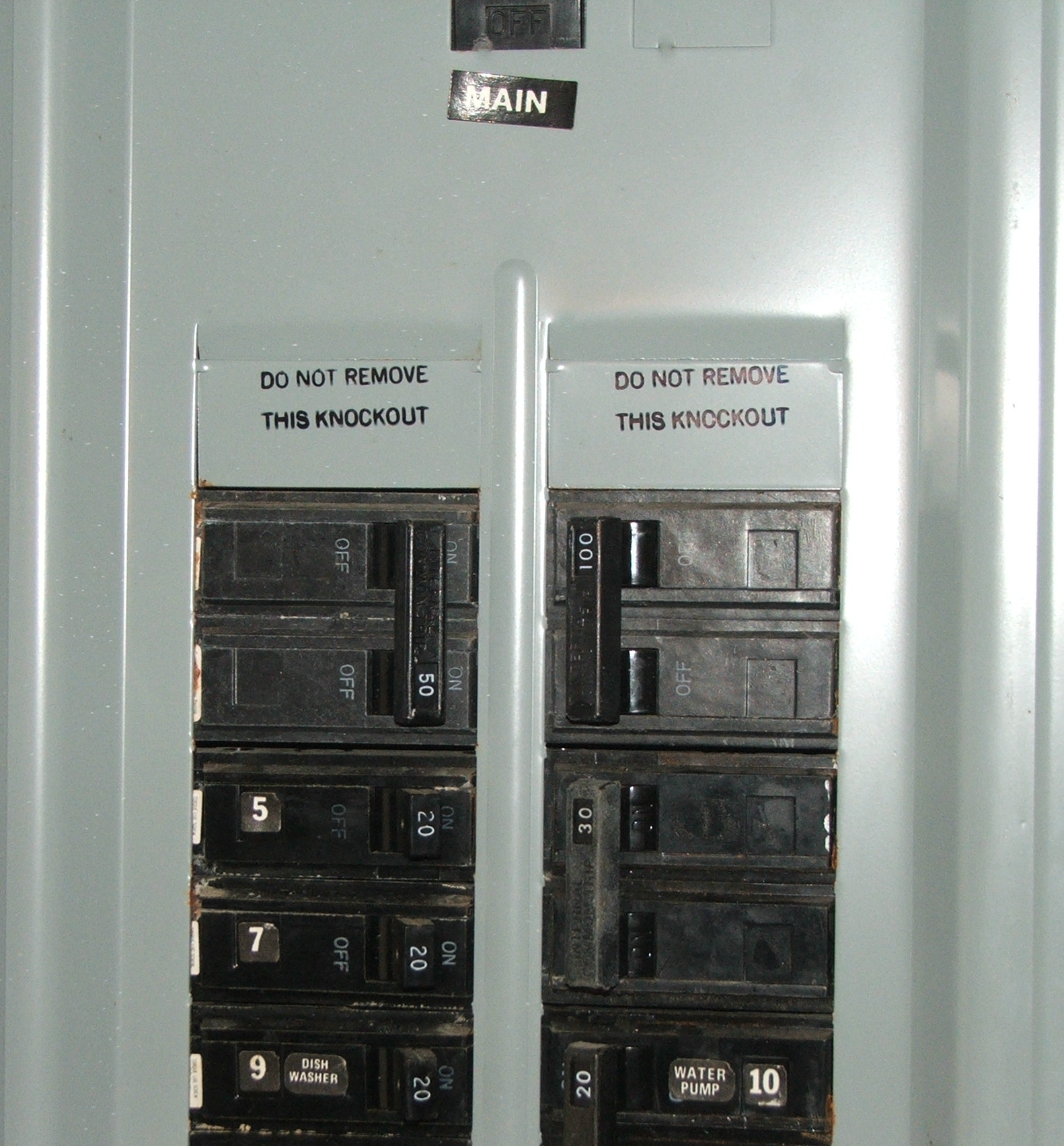
Illustration of breaker numbering in a North American type panelboard. Some labels are missing, and some are additional. The numbers on the toggles indicate the rated amperage before tripping. The top right breaker (Rated at 100 A) feeds a sub panel.

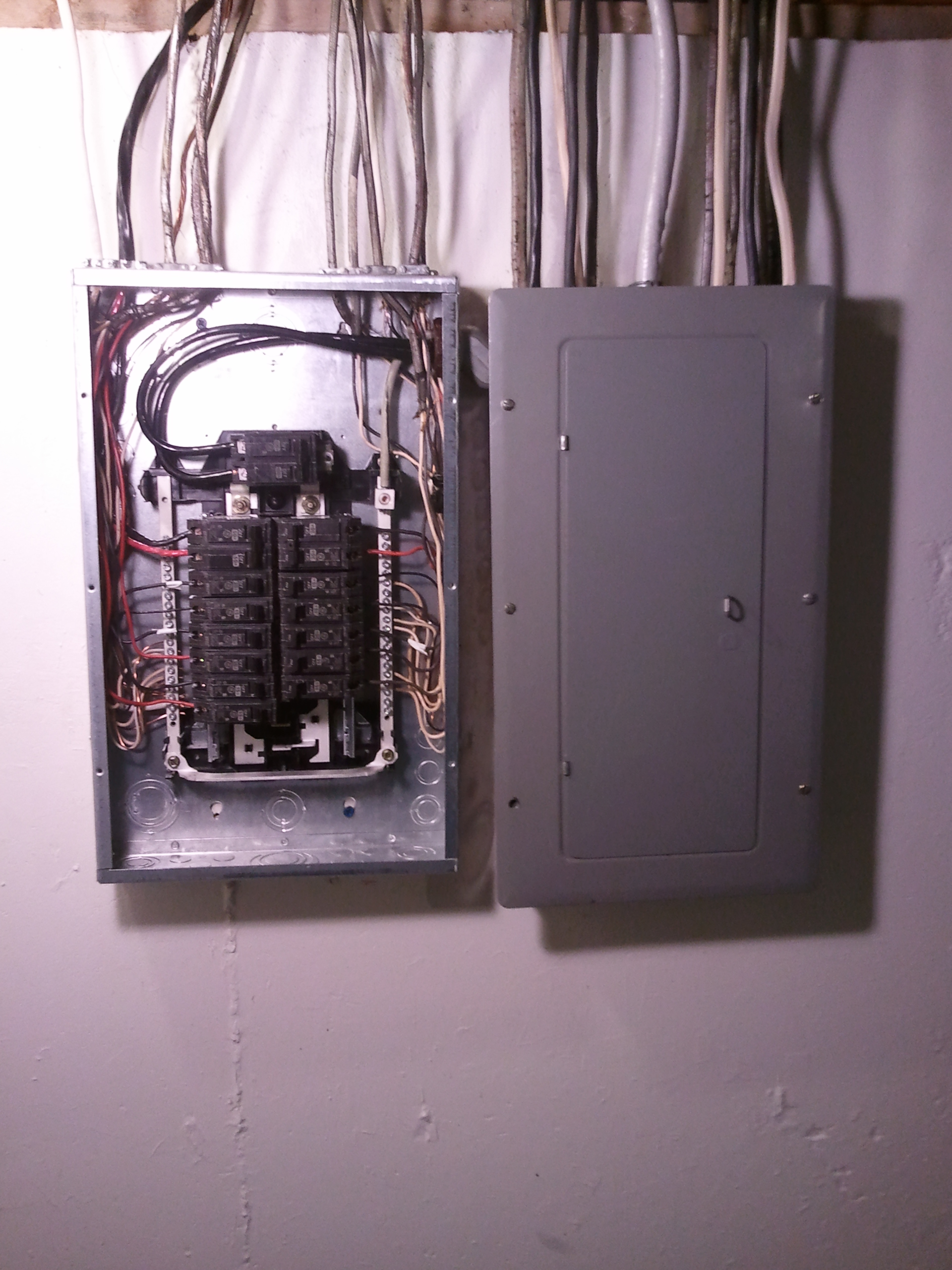
Electrical panel and subpanel with cover removed from subpanel.

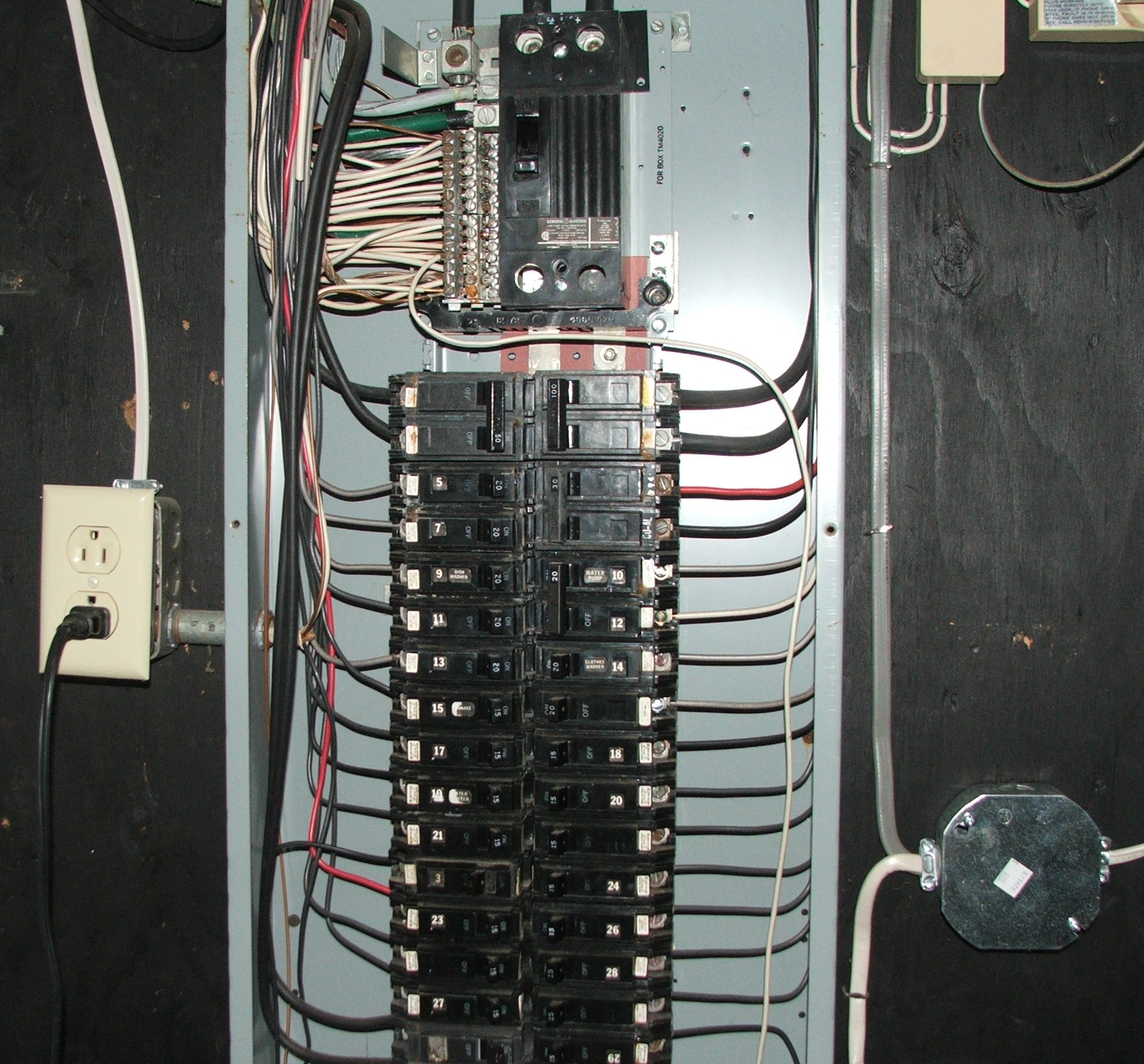
The internal wiring visible.

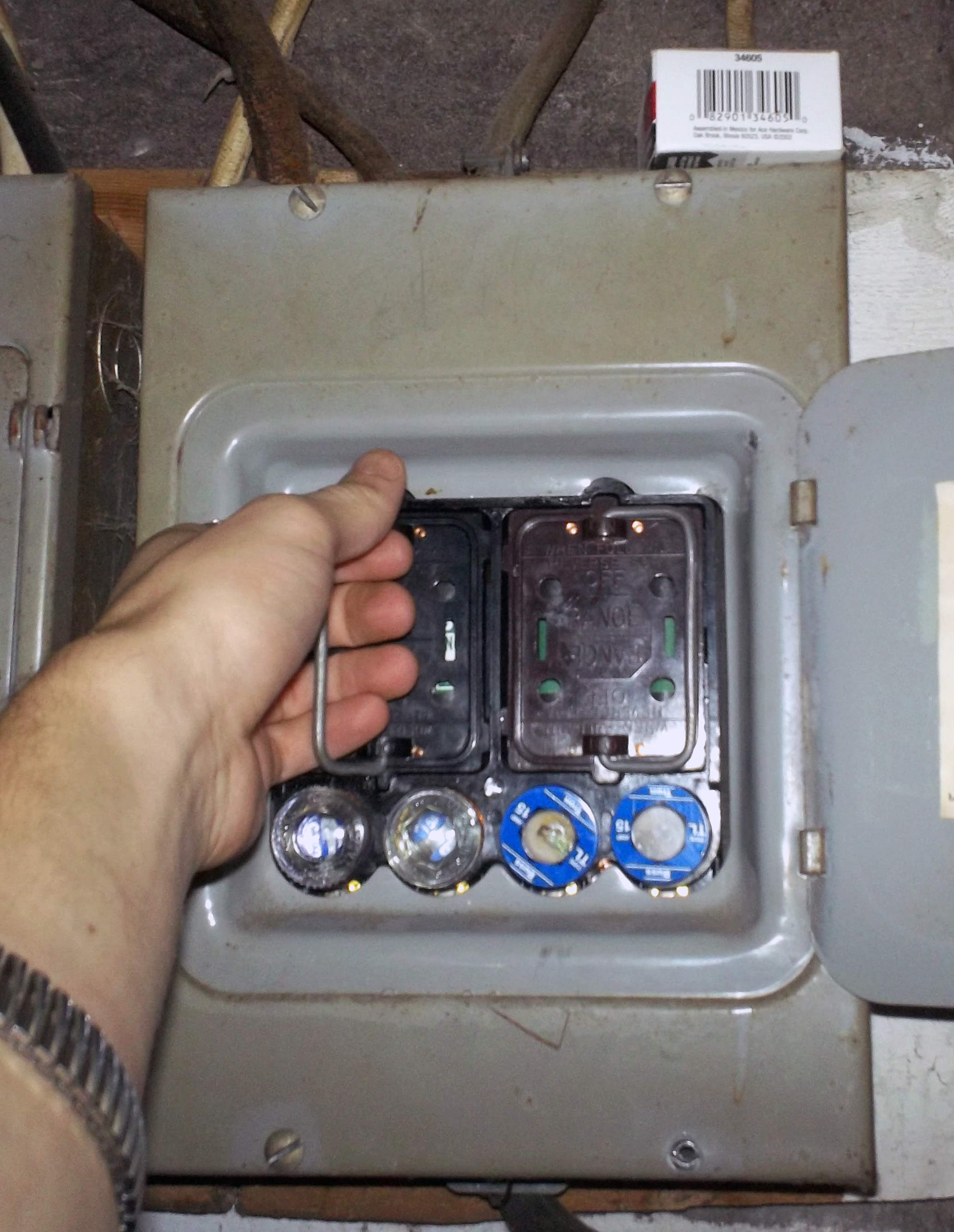
An older style fuse box of the variety used in the United States.

=== Fuse boxes ===
A common design of fuse box that was featured in homes built from 1940 through 1965 was the 60-amp fuse box that included four plug fuses (i.e. the Edison base) for branch circuits and one or more fuse blocks containing cartridge fuses for purposes such as major appliance circuits. After 1965, the more substantial 100 A panel with three-wire (230 V) service became common; a fuse box could have fuse blocks for the main shut-off and an electric range circuit plus a number of plug fuses (Edison base or Type S) for individual circuits.

== United Kingdom ==
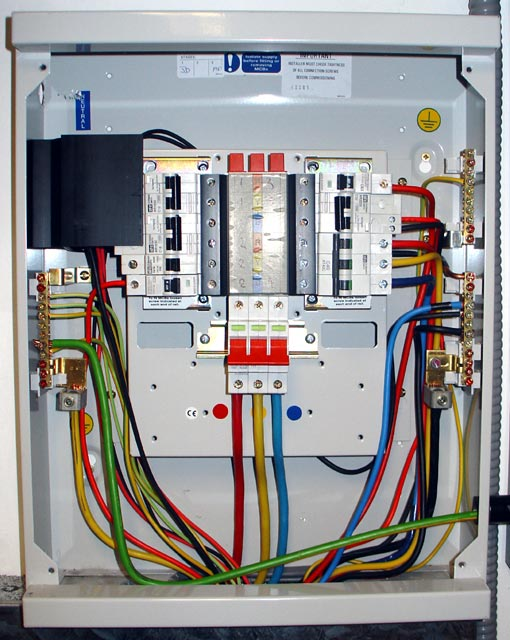
One type of UK distribution board.

This picture shows the interior of a typical distribution panel in the United Kingdom. The three incoming phase wires connect to the busbars via a main switch in the centre of the panel. On each side of the panel are two busbars, for neutral and earth. The incoming neutral connects to the lower busbar on the right side of the panel, which is in turn connected to the neutral busbar at the top left. The incoming earth wire connects to the lower busbar on the left side of the panel, which is in turn connected to the earth busbar at the top right. The cover has been removed from the lower-right neutral bar; the neutral bar on the left side has its cover in place.

Down the left side of the phase busbars are two two-pole RCBOs and two single-pole breakers, one unused. The two-pole RCBOs in the picture are not connected across two phases, but have supply-side neutral connections exiting behind the phase busbars. Down the right side of the busbars are a single-pole breaker, a two-pole RCBO and a three-pole breaker.

Larger commercial, public, and industrial installations generally use three-phase supplies, with distribution boards which have twin vertical rows of breakers. Larger installations will often use subsidiary distribution boards.

In both cases, modern boards handling supplies up to around 100 A (CUs) or 200 A (distribution boards) use circuit breakers and RCDs on DIN rail mountings. The main distribution board in an installation will also normally provide a main switch (known as an incomer) which switches the phase and neutral lines for the whole supply. (n.b., an incomer may be referred to, or sold as, an isolator, but this is problematic, as it will not necessarily be used as an isolator in the strict sense.)

For each phase, power is fed along a busbar. In split-phase panels, separate busbars are fed directly from the incomer, which allows RCDs to be used to protect groups of circuits. Alternatively RCBOs may be used to provide both overcurrent and residual-current protection to single circuits.

Other devices, such as transformers (e.g. for bell circuits) and contactors (relays; e.g. for large motor or heating loads) may also be used.

New British distribution boards generally have the live parts enclosed to IP2X, even when the cover has been removed for servicing.

=== Consumer units ===
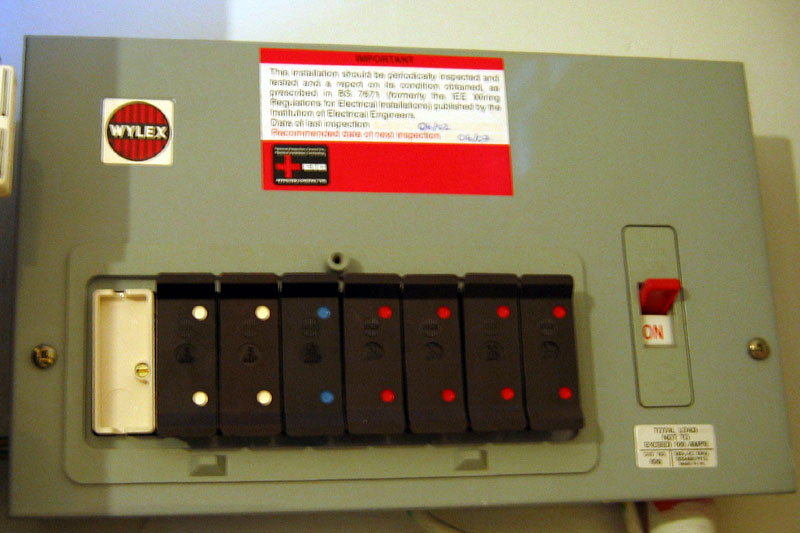
Old Wylex standard consumer unit fitted with seven wire fuses (one fuse-way is not in use)

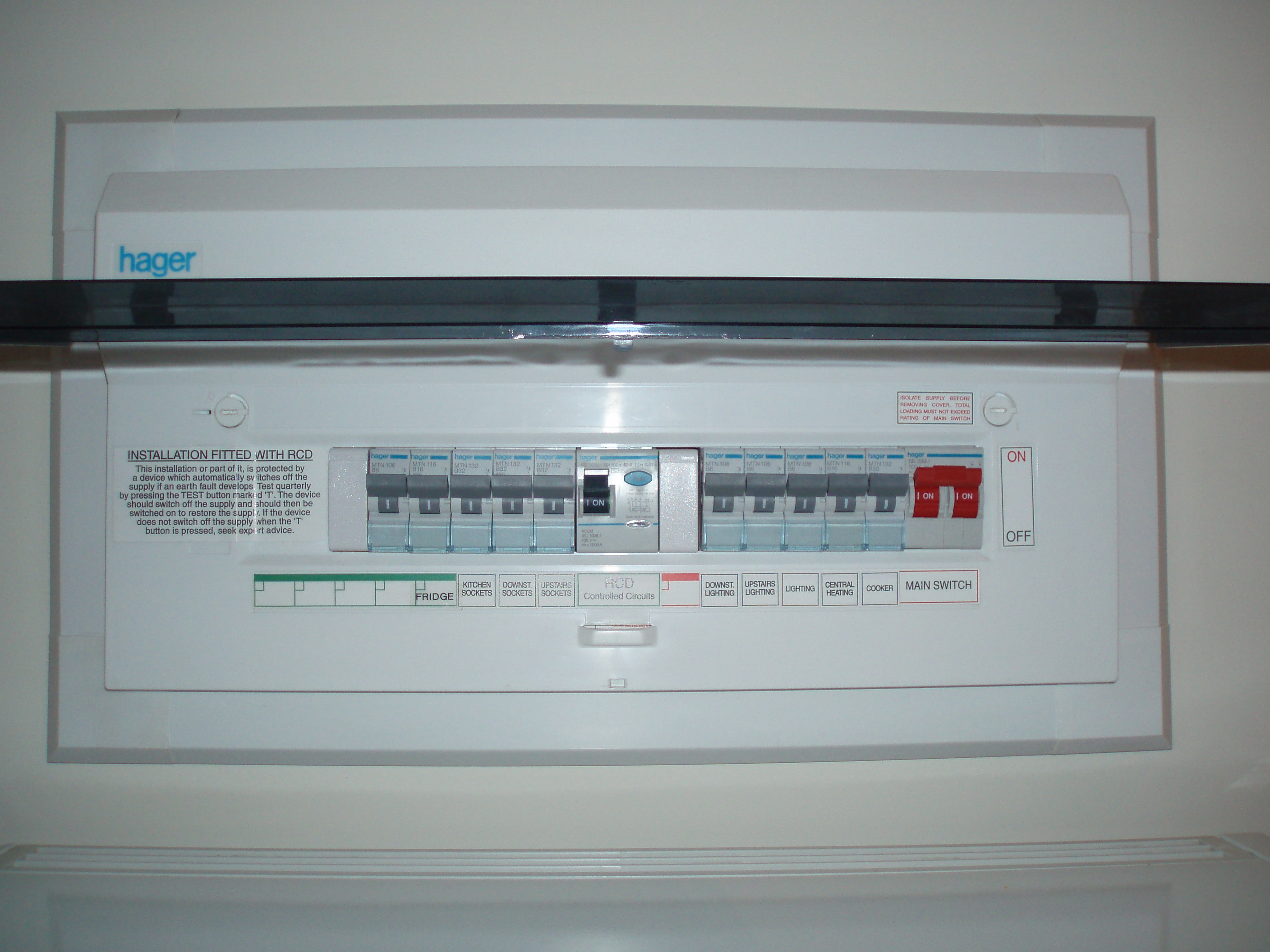
Hager consumer unit fitted with MCBs, one RCD, and one double-pole switch

In the United Kingdom, BS 7671 defines a consumer unit as "A particular type of distribution board comprising a type tested coordinated assembly for the control and distribution of electrical energy, principally in domestic premises..." These installations usually have single-phase supplies at 230 V (nominal standard); historically, they were known as fuse boxes, as older consumer units used fuses until the advent of mini-circuit breakers (MCBs). A normal new domestic CU used as a main panel might have from 6 to 24 ways for devices (some of which might occupy two ways), and will be split into two or more sections (e.g. a non-RCD section for alarms etc., an RCD-protected section for socket outlets, and an RCD-protected section for lighting and other built-in appliances). Secondary CUs used for outbuildings usually have 1 to 4 ways plus an RCD.

Recent (pre-17th edition wiring regulations) CUs would not normally have RCD protected sections for anything other than socket outlets, though some older CUs featured RCD incomers. Before 1990, RCDs (and split busbars) were not standard in CUs.

Old rewirable-fuse boxes

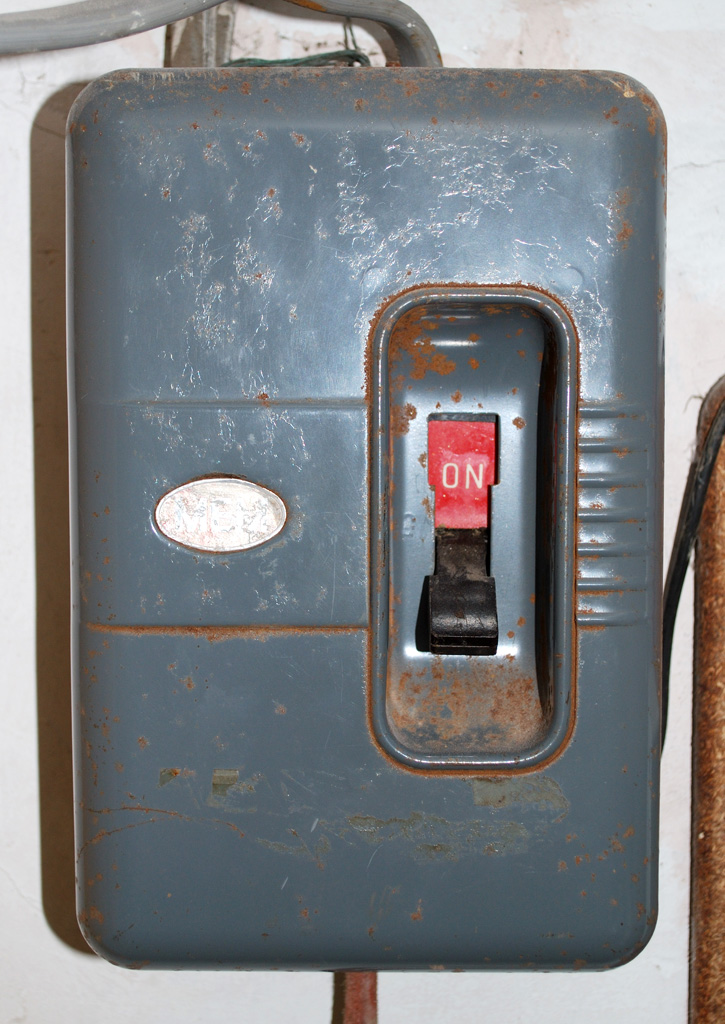
1950s MEM rewirable fuse box (covered)

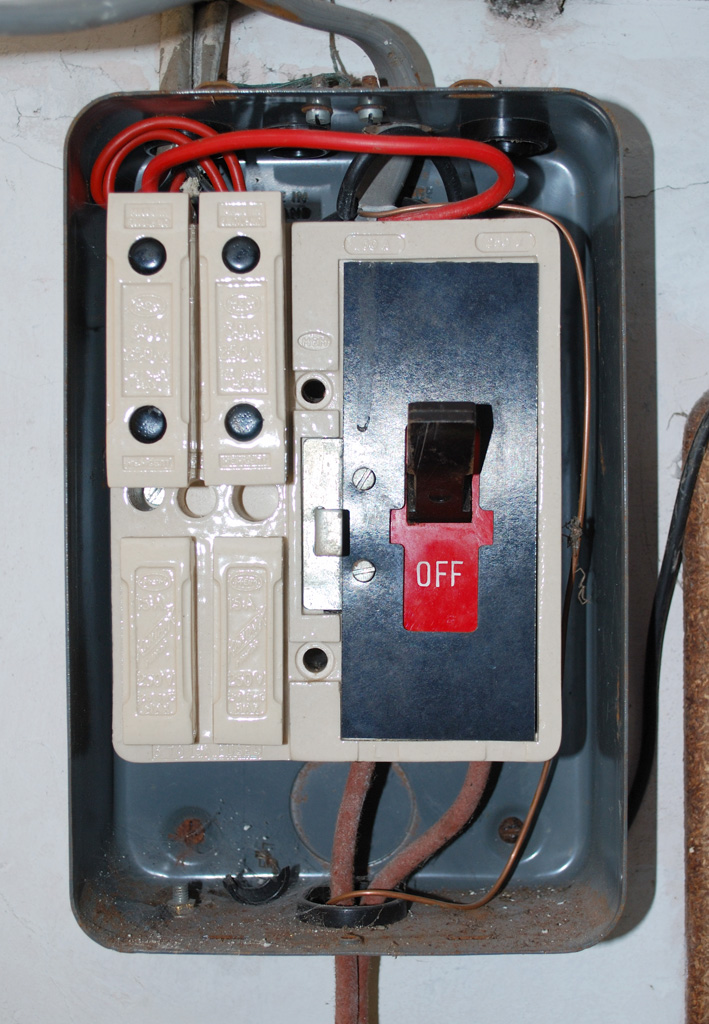
1950s MEM rewirable fuse box (open)

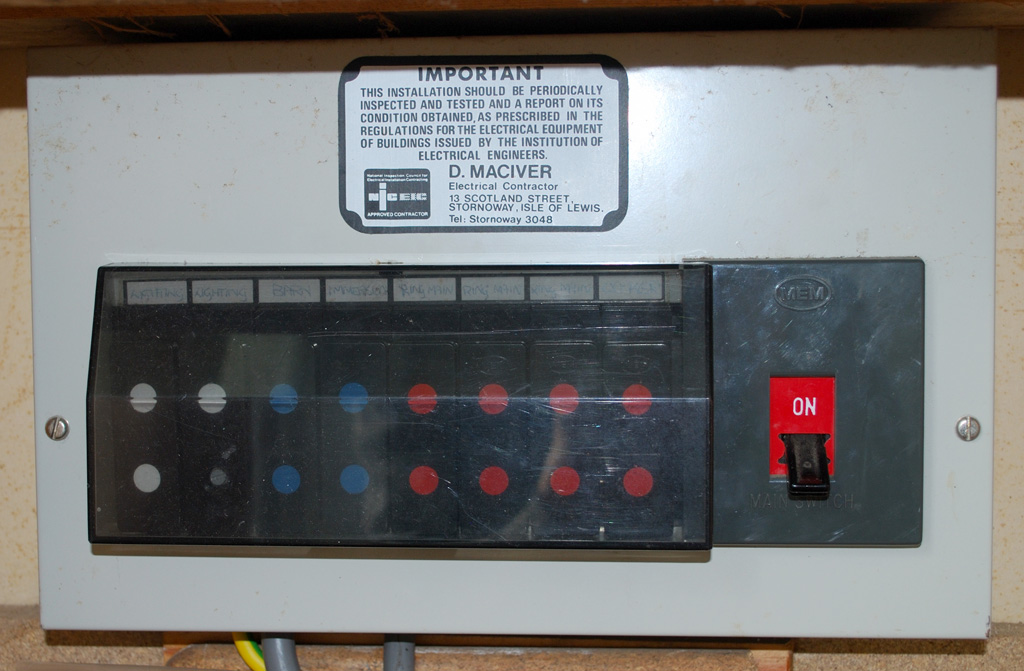
1970s MEM rewirable fuse box (covered)

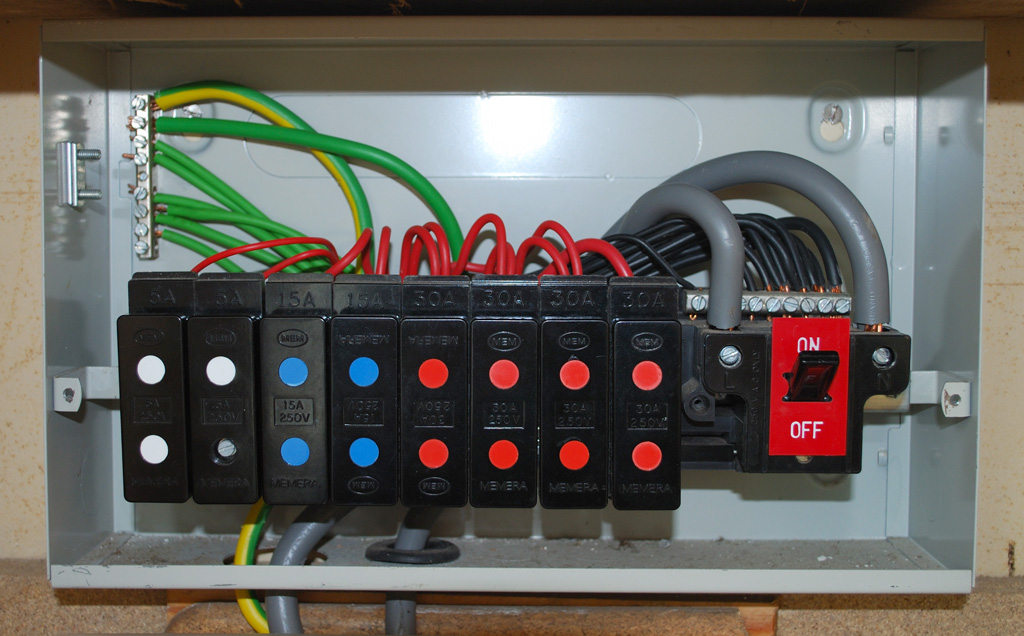
1970s MEM rewirable fuse box (open)

Fuse boxes normally use cartridge or rewirable fuses with no other protective device, and basic 4-ways boxes are very common. Some older boxes are made of brown-black bakelite, sometimes with a wooden base. Although their design is historic, these were standard equipment for new installs as recently as the 1980s, so they are very common. Fuseholders in these boxes may not provide protection from accidental contact with live terminals.

==== Examples ====
In the UK, consumer units (CU) have evolved from basic main switch and rewireable fuses, that afforded only overload and short circuit protection, into sophisticated control units housing many safety features that can protect against different types of electrical fault. The choice of circuit protective device will depend upon the type of electrical circuit it is protecting and what level of protection needs to be afforded. BS7671:2018 Requirements for Electrical Installations, also referred to as the IET Wiring Regulations, gets regularly updated and its latest edition at the time of writing is amendment 2:2022 released on 28 March 2022. Typical configurations of CU:

- Main switch consumer unit – Consists of a main switch that will disconnect power to all circuits simultaneously which has one busbar linking all protective devices to a common live source, and one neutral conductor or link bar connecting to a common neutral rail. There will be a separate earth rail to allow the main earth conductor to be connected. This example offers the highest degree of circuit separation as all circuits are independent. This particular example amay not be suitable as a standalone solution with only overload and short circuit protection MCBs for each circuit. Additional protection from earth leakage RCBOs faults and arc faults AFDD may be required by BS7671 making this an expensive solution.
- Main Switch and Dual RCD consumer unit – Consists of a main switch that will disconnect power to all circuits simultaneously and two 30mA RCDs RCDs each with its own live busbar each protecting a separate bank of circuits, typically half-and-half but other combinations are available, from earth leakage faults. Offers a cost-effective solution by using a combination of cheaper mcbs and only two, more expensive, RCDs.
- High integrity consumer unit – Consists of a main switch that will disconnect power to all circuits simultaneously and three separate live busbars, one linked directly to the main switch and two others on each main RCD. The live busbar on the main switch allows the use of mcbs only where more sensitive devices such as RCBOs and AFDDs would not be appropriate, or the independent use of RCBOs, and may be limited to only one or two ways. The remainder of the circuits are divided in the same way as a dual RCD CU. This type of consumer unit offers improved circuit separation over a dual RCD CU whilst allowing for more flexibility.
- RCD incomer consumer unit – This is the least convenient solution in terms of circuit separation because the main switch is an RCD. Less common than the other types, it is no longer considered a standalone solution because power to all circuits is lost in the event of an earth fault causing the main switch RCD to activate.

Modern consumer units are now required to be metal (non-combustible) and usually use DIN rail mounted devices. The DIN rail is standardized but the busbar arrangements are not. Mixing of different brands devices is against the manufacturers requirements and should generally be avoided.

The choice of consumer unit will reflect several factors such as the size and layout of the dwelling, number of floors, outbuildings, the expected loads (lighting, sockets, ovens, showers, immersion heaters, car-chargers etc.), and how much protection is required for each circuit.

The box pictured top-right is a "Wylex standard" fitted with rewirable fuses. These boxes can also be fitted with cartridge fuses or miniature circuit breakers (MCBs). This type of consumer unit was very popular in Britain until 2001 when wiring regulations mandated residual-current device (RCD) protection for sockets that could "reasonably be expected to" supply outdoor equipment (BS 7671:2001, ISBN 0-86341-373-0). There were a number of similar designs from other manufacturers but the Wylex ones are by far the most commonly encountered and the only ones for which fuseholders/breakers are still commonly available.

Some manufacturers have added innovative features such as CPN Cudis who have added a LED strip light to their 'Lumo' consumer unit to enhance visibility in dark locations such as under staircases.

==== RCD protection types ====
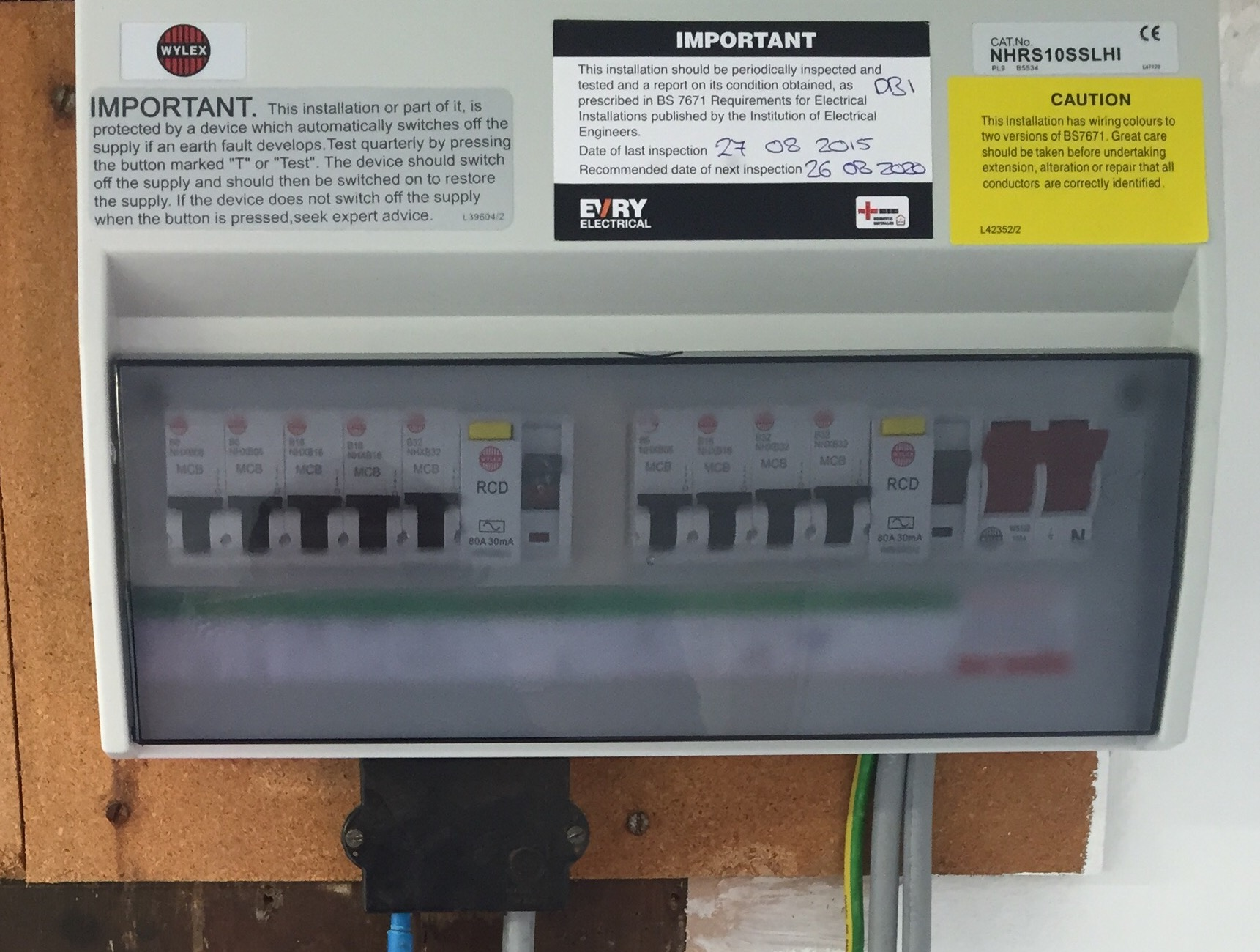
Modern RCD Protection Consumer Dual Split-Load

Since the introduction of (BS 7671:2008 incorporating amendment no 1: 2011) 17th Edition IET Wiring Regulations, consumer units in the UK must provide RCD protection to all cables embedded in walls excepting high integrity circuits such as those for burglar alarms or smoke alarms.

Consumer units have different methods of protecting circuits. For example, a dual split-load consumer unit can be arranged in a two-story dwelling as follows:

RCD 1

- Upstairs Lights,
- Downstairs Ring Final,
- Garage Sockets,
- Cooker

RCD 2

- Downstairs Lights,
- Upstairs Sockets,
- Shower,
- Heating

By arranging the circuits like this, power will still be present on one of the floors if only one RCD trips out. Moreover, having sockets and lights on alternate RCD's means that if a faulty kettle downstairs trips that RCD for example, the kitchen lights will still be available, avoiding the hazard of investigating the fault in darkness.

Another way to protect circuits under the 17th Edition IET Wiring Regulations is by fitting Residual Current Circuit Breaker With Overload (RCBOs) to every circuit, and although this is more costly than the RCD+MCB's option, it means any fault condition on a circuit trips only that circuit's RCBO, so the search for the fault is narrowed down from the start. When an electrician must be called out, this localised fault can be resolved faster (and therefore cheaper) in contrast with the RCD+MCB's arrangement, which only indicates a fault somewhere within that RCD's set of circuits.

Some older systems such as those that use MK or old MEM Consumer Units that had one fuse per spur, so for instance:

- Upstairs Lights Fuse 1
- Upstairs Sockets Fuse 2
- Downstairs Lights Fuse 3
- Downstairs Sockets Fuse 4

etc..

=== Legacy fuseboxes ===
A small number of pre-1950 fuseboxes are still in service. These should be treated with caution because exposed live parts are common on these boxes. The installations they supply will not meet modern standards for electrical safety. Another characteristic of very old installations is that there may be two fuses for each circuit; one on the live and one on the neutral. In rare instances, old ring circuits may be encountered with no fewer than 4 15 A fuses per ring, one on each of L and N, and this duplicated for each of the two feeds for the ring.

== Manufacturer differences ==
Despite the adoption of a standard DIN rail for mounting and a standard cut-out shape for seemingly interchangeable breakers, the positions of busbar connections and other features are not standardized. Each manufacturer has one or more "systems", or kinds of breaker panels, that is only fully compatible with breakers of that type. These assemblies have been tested and approved for use by a recognized authority. Replacing or adding equipment which "just happens to fit" can result in unexpected or even dangerous conditions. Such installations should not be done without first consulting knowledgeable sources, including manufacturers' datasheets.

== Location and designation ==
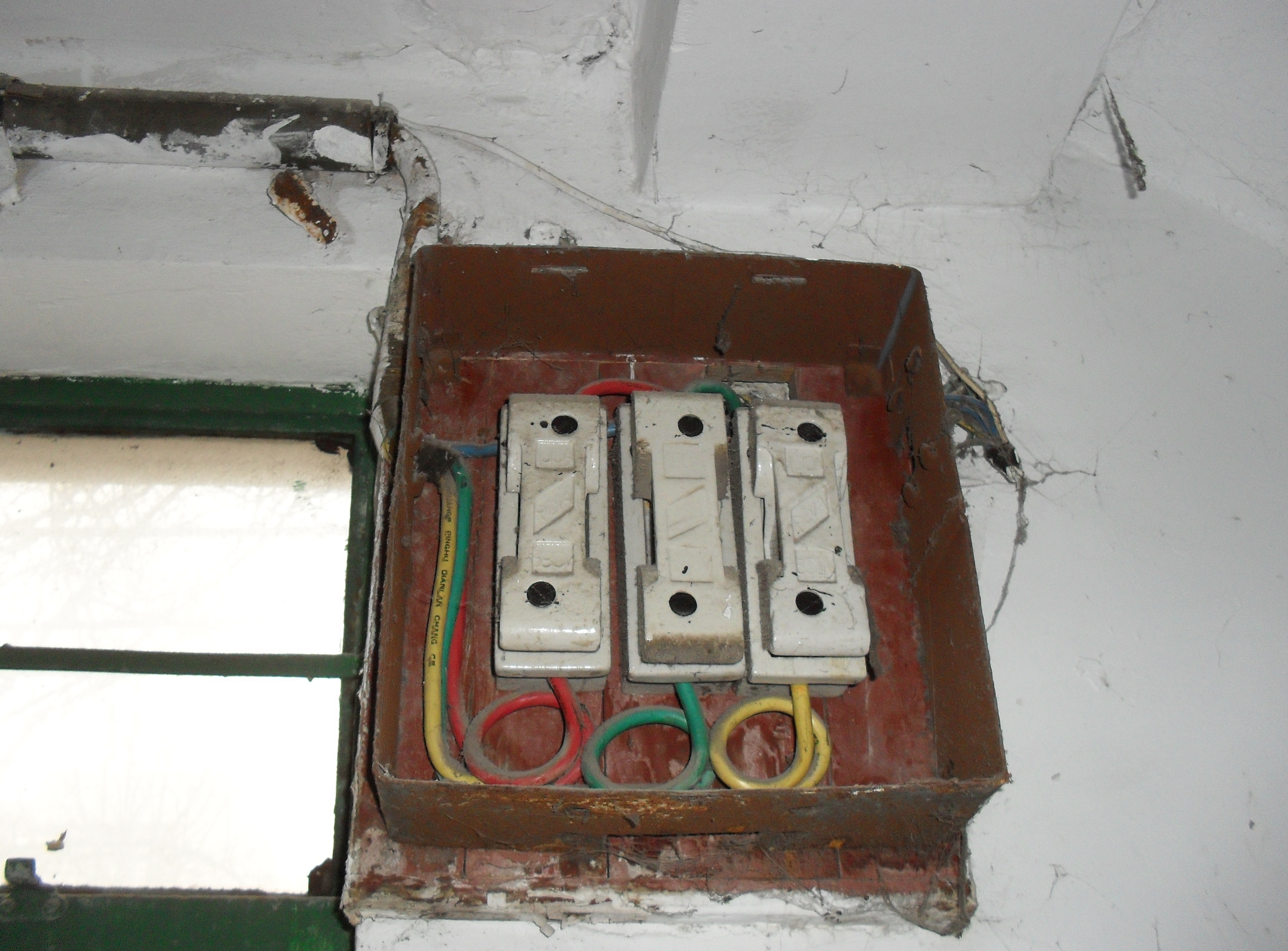
A three-phase service drop enters through the side of this main service panel consisting of three 100 ampere fuses.

For reasons of aesthetics and security, domestic circuit breaker panels and consumer units are normally located in out-of-the-way closets, attics, garages, or basements, but sometimes they are also featured as part of the aesthetic elements of a building (as an art installation, for example) or where they can be easily accessible. However, current U.S. building codes prohibit installation of a panel in a bathroom (or similar room), in closets intended for clothing, or where there is insufficient space for an electrician to gain access to the panel. Specific situations, such as an installation outdoors, in a hazardous environment, or in other out-of-the-ordinary locations might require specialized equipment and more stringent installation practices.

Distribution boards may be designated for three phase or single phase and normal power or emergency power, or designated by use such as distribution panels for supplying other panels, lighting panels for lights, power panels for equipment and receptacles and special uses. Panels are located throughout the building in electric closets serving a section of the building.

== Theatre lighting ==
In a theatre, a specialty panel known as a dimmer rack is used to feed stage lighting instruments. A U.S. style dimmer rack has a 208Y/120 volt 3-phase feed. Instead of just circuit breakers, the rack has a solid state electronic dimmer with its own circuit breaker for each stage circuit. This is known as a dimmer-per-circuit arrangement. The dimmers are equally divided across the three incoming phases. In a 96 dimmer rack, there are 32 dimmers on phase A, 32 dimmers on phase B, and 32 on phase C to spread out the lighting load as equally as possible. In addition to the power feed from the supply transformer in the building, a control cable from the lighting desk carries information to the dimmers in a control protocol such as DMX-512. The information includes lighting level information for each channel, by which it controls which dimmer circuits come up and go out during the lighting changes of the show (light cues), and over what fade time.

Distribution boards may be surface-mounted or flush. The former arrangement provides easier alteration or addition to wiring at a later date, but the latter arrangement might be neater, particularly for a residential application. The other problem with recessing a distribution board into a wall is that if the wall is solid, a lot of brick or block might need to be removed—generally for this reason, recessed boards would only be installed on new-build projects when the required space can be built into the wall.

== See also ==
- Circuit total limitation
- Consumer unit
- Electric switchboard
- Electricity meter
- Electrical busbar system
- Switchgear
