= DIN rail =

International standard for mounting equipment

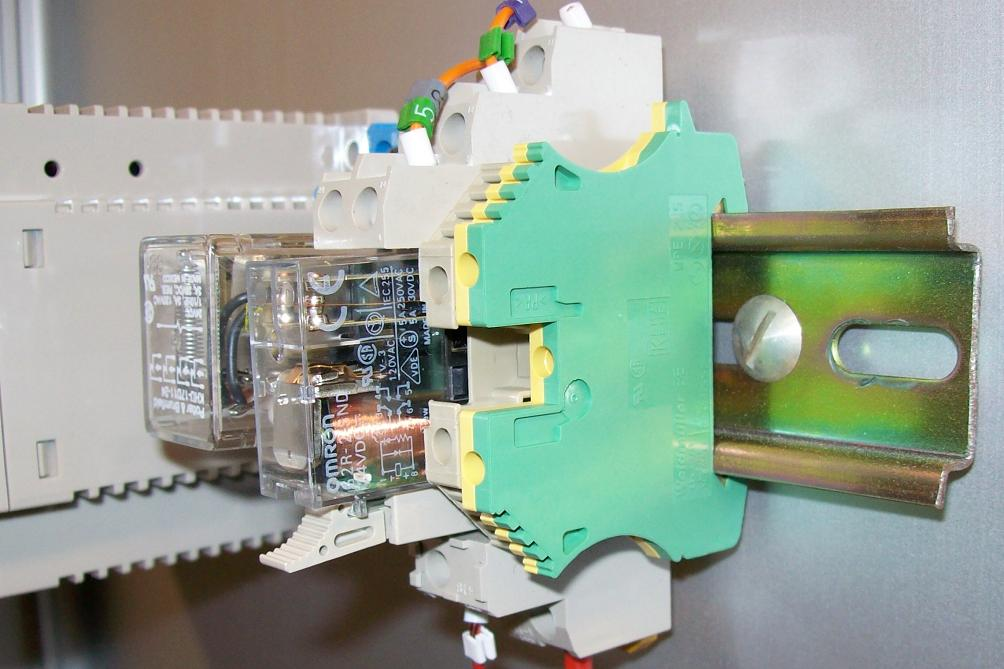
A front view of a populated 35 mm DIN rail

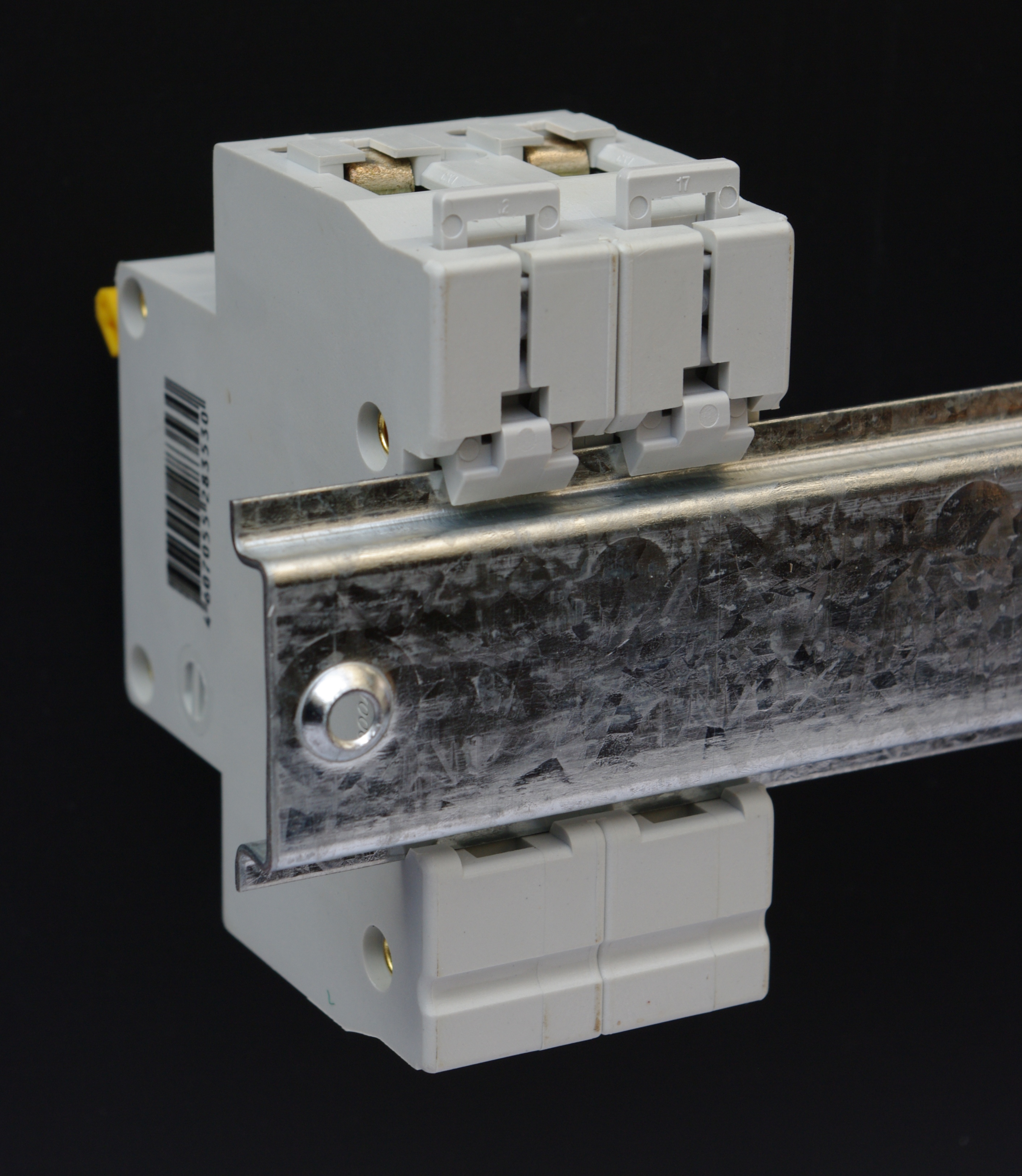
Rear view. Note the release loops at the top of the mounted devices which unclip them.

A DIN rail is a metal rail of a standard type widely used for mounting circuit breakers and industrial control equipment inside equipment racks. These products are typically made from cold rolled carbon steel sheet with a zinc-plated or chromated bright surface finish. Although metallic, they are meant only for mechanical support and are not used as a busbar to conduct electric current, though they may provide a chassis grounding connection.

The term derives from the original specifications published by Deutsches Institut für Normung (DIN) in Germany, which have since been adopted as European (EN) and international (IEC) standards. The original concept was developed and implemented in Germany in 1928, and was elaborated into the present standards in the 1950s.

== Types ==
There are three major types of DIN rail:

- Top hat section (TH), type O, or type Ω, with hat-shaped cross section.
- C section
- G section

=== Top hat rail IEC/EN 60715 ===

This 35 mm wide rail is widely used to mount circuit breakers, relays, programmable logic controllers, motor controllers, and other electrical equipment. The EN 60715 standard specifies both a 7.5 mm (shown above) and a 15 mm deep version, which are officially designated

- top hat rail IEC/EN 60715 – 35 × 7.5
- top hat rail IEC/EN 60715 – 35 × 15

Some manufacturers catalogues also use the terms: Top hat section / TH / TH35 (for 35mm wide) / Type O / Type Omega (Ω).

The rail is known as the TS35 rail in the US.

==== Module width ====
The width of devices that are mounted on a 35 mm "top hat" DIN rail generally use "modules" as a width unit, one module being 18 mm wide. For example, a small device (e.g. a circuit breaker) may have a width of 1 module (18 mm wide), while a larger device may have a width of 4 modules (4 × 18 mm = 72 mm). Equipment enclosures also follow these module widths, so an enclosure with a DIN rail may have space for 20 modules, for example. Not all devices follow these module widths.

Module widths are usually abbreviated as "M" (e.g. 4M = 4 modules). Some manufacturers (including Mean Well) use "SU."

=== C section ===
These rails are symmetrical within the tolerances given and referenced by the standard EN 50024 (abrogated). There are four popular C section rails, C20, C30, C40 and C50. The number suffix corresponds to the overall vertical height of the rail.

=== G section ===
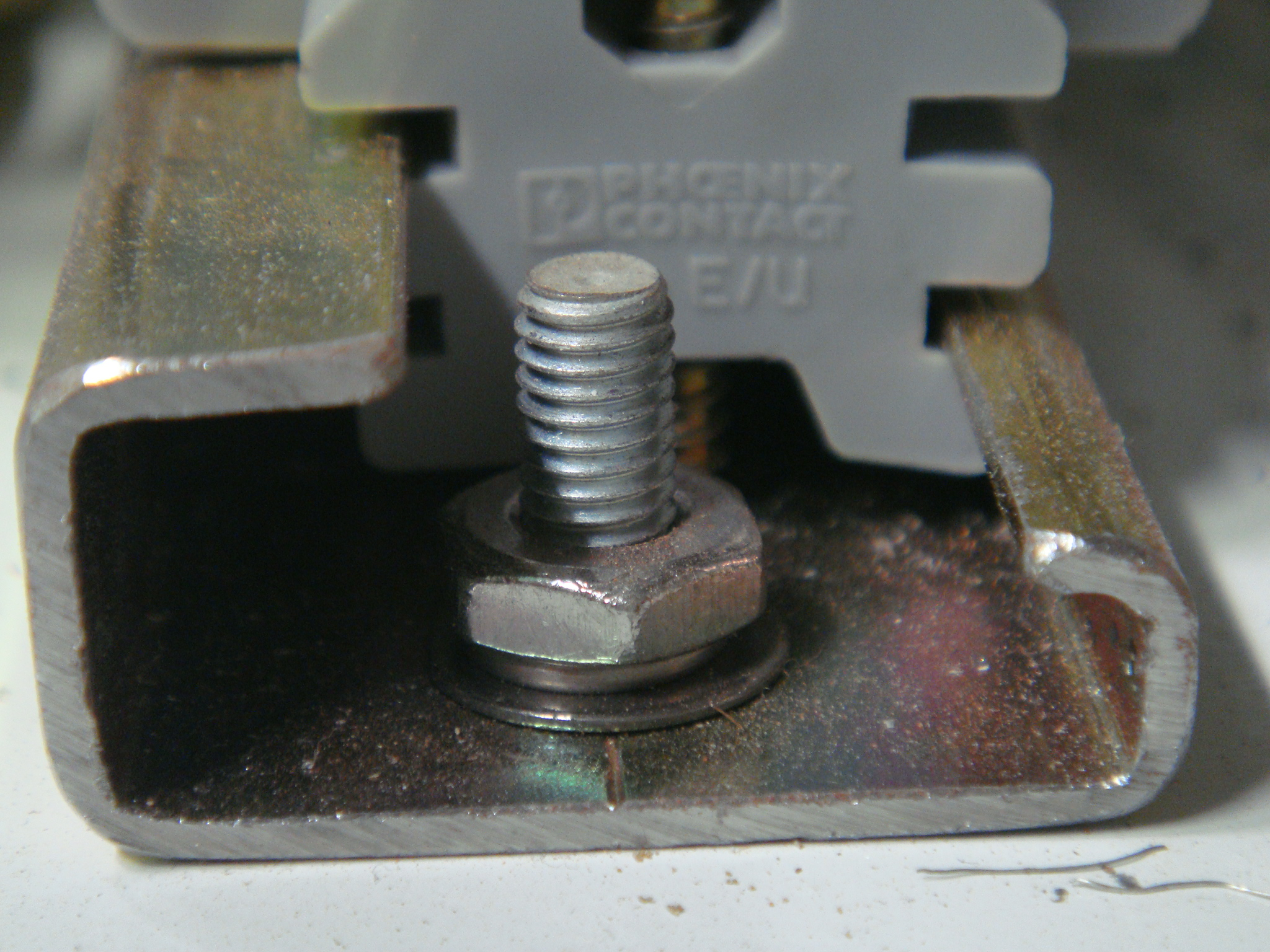
Cross section view of a G-type DIN rail, with electrical equipment mounted on it

G-type rail (according to EN 50035 (abrogated), BS 5825, DIN 46277-1).

G rail is generally used to hold heavier, higher-power components. It is mounted with the deeper side at the bottom, and equipment is hooked over the lip, then rotated until it clips into the shallower side.

== Others ==
In addition to the popular 35 mm × 7.5 mm top-hat rail (EN 50022, BS 5584, DIN 46277-3), several less widely used types of mounting rails have also been standardized:

- Miniature top-hat rail, 15 mm × 5.5 mm (EN 50045, BS 6273, DIN 46277-2);
- 75 mm wide top-hat rail (EN 50023, BS 5585);

== Related equipment ==
- European Standard EN 50022: Specification for low voltage switchgear and control-gear for industrial use. Mounting rails. Top hat rails 35 mm wide for snap-on mounting of equipment. (formerly: German Standard DIN 46277, British Standard BS 5584)
- IEC International Standard 60715: Dimensions of low-voltage switchgear and control-gear. Standardized mounting on rails for mechanical support of electrical devices in switchgear and control-gear installations.
- Australian Standard AS 2756.1997: Low-voltage switchgear and controlgear - Mounting rails for mechanical support of electrical equipment.

== See also ==
- Printed circuit board
