= Pattress =

Container behind an electrical fitting

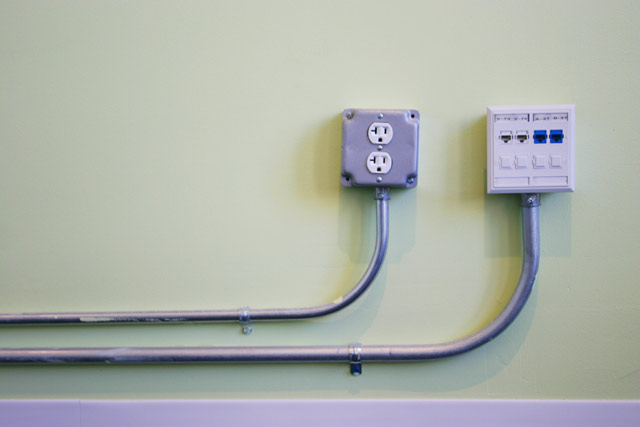
External pattress boxes: power and data sockets

A pattress or pattress box or fitting box (in the United States and Canada, electrical wall switch box, electrical wall outlet box, electrical ceiling box, switch box, outlet box, electrical box, etc.) is the container for the space behind electrical fittings such as power outlet sockets, light switches, or fixed light fixtures. Pattresses may be designed for either surface mounting (with cabling running along the wall surface) or for embedding in the wall or skirting board. Some electricians use the term "pattress box" to describe a surface-mounted box, although simply the term "pattress" suffices.

The term "flush box" is used for a mounting box that goes inside the wall, although some use the term "wall box". Boxes for installation within timber or plasterboard walls are usually called "cavity boxes" or "plasterboard boxes". A ceiling-mounted pattress (most often used for light fixtures) is referred to as a "ceiling pattress" or "ceiling box". British English speakers also tend to say "pattress box" instead of just "pattress".

Pattress is alternatively spelt patress. The word pattress, despite being attested from the late 19th century, is still rarely found in dictionaries. It is etymologically derived from pateras (Latin for bowls, saucers). The term is not used by electricians in the United States.

== Pattresses ==
Pattresses contain devices for input (switches) and output (sockets and fixtures), with transfer managed by junction boxes. A pattress may be made of metal or plastic. In the United Kingdom, surface-mounted boxes in particular are often made from urea-formaldehyde resin or alternatively PVC and usually white. Wall boxes are commonly made of thin galvanised metal. A pattress box is made to standard dimensions and may contain embedded bushings (in standard positions) for the attachment of wiring devices (switches and sockets). Internal pattress boxes themselves do not include the corresponding faceplates, since the devices to be contained in the box specify the required faceplate. External pattress boxes may often include corresponding faceplates, limiting the devices to be contained in the box.

Although cables may be joined inside pattress boxes, due simply to their presence at convenient points in the wiring, their main purpose is to accommodate switches and sockets. They allow switches and sockets to be recessed into the wall for a better appearance. Enclosures primarily for joining wires are called junction boxes.

== Types of outlet boxes ==
Outlet boxes can be surface or sub-surface mounted. The latter type can be further divided by the type of wall it is intended for: sub-surface outlet boxes are available for mounting in drywall, in brick walls or in concrete walls.

=== North America ===
In North America, outlet boxes are rectangular in shape and are available in different sizes, to accommodate varying numbers of switches. Boxes for drywall are commonly available in two types: new work and old work. New-work boxes are designed to be installed in a new installation. They are typically designed with nail or screw holes to attach directly to wall studs. Old-work boxes are designed to attach to already-installed wall material (usually drywall). The boxes will almost always have two or more parsellas (from Latin: small wing or part). The parsellas flip out when the box screws are screwed, securing the box to the wall with the help of the four or more tabs on the front of the box.

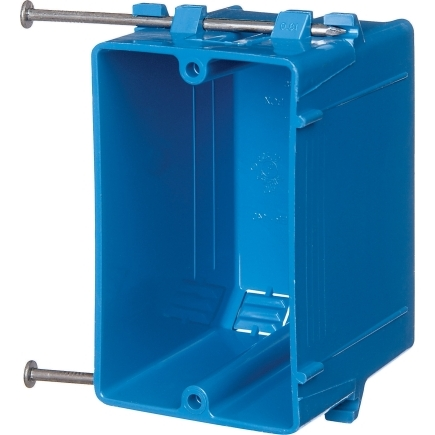
New-work wall box. Nails attach box to side of stud.

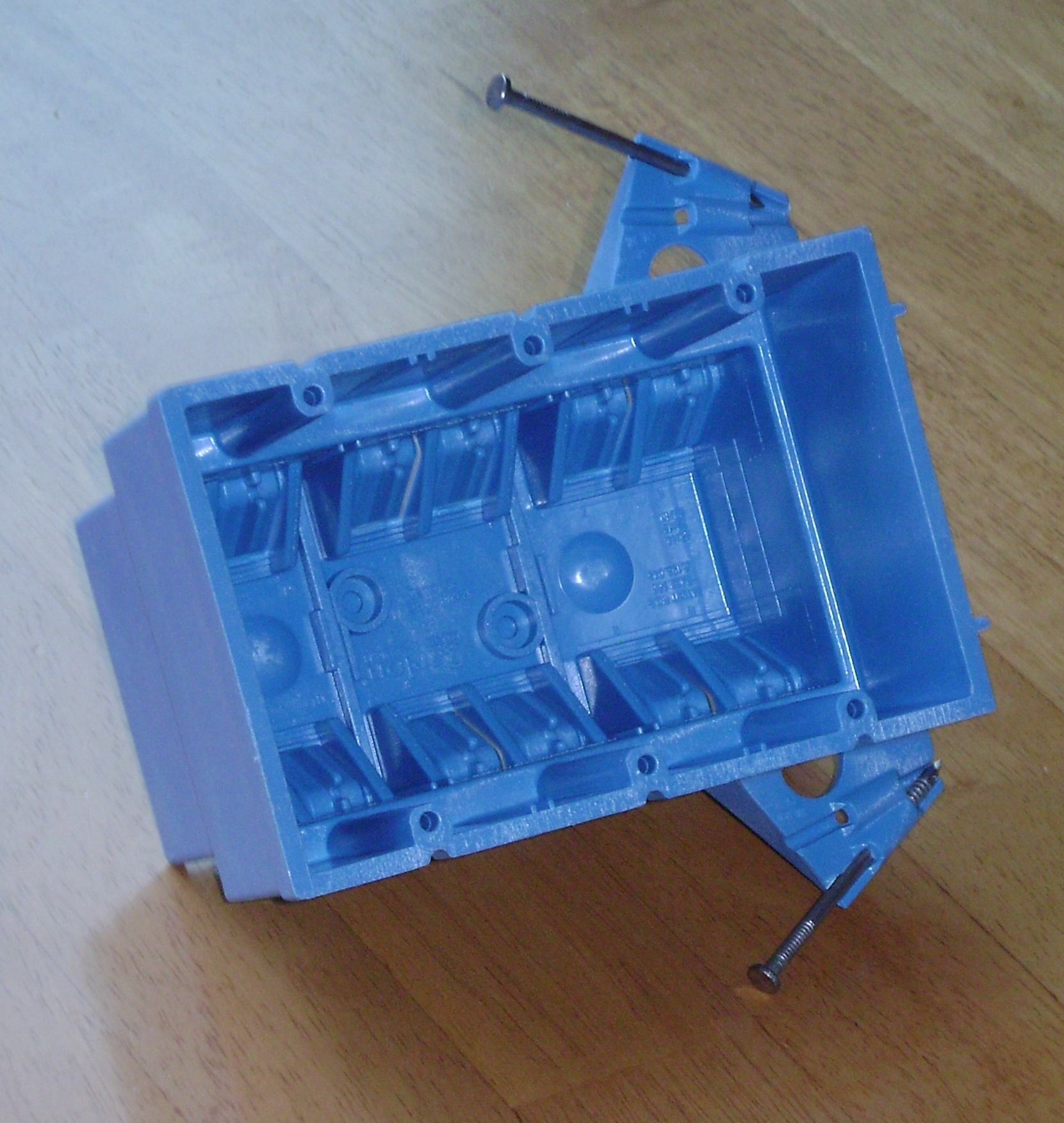
US-style new-work wall box with room for three light switches. To be nailed sideways to a wooden beam.

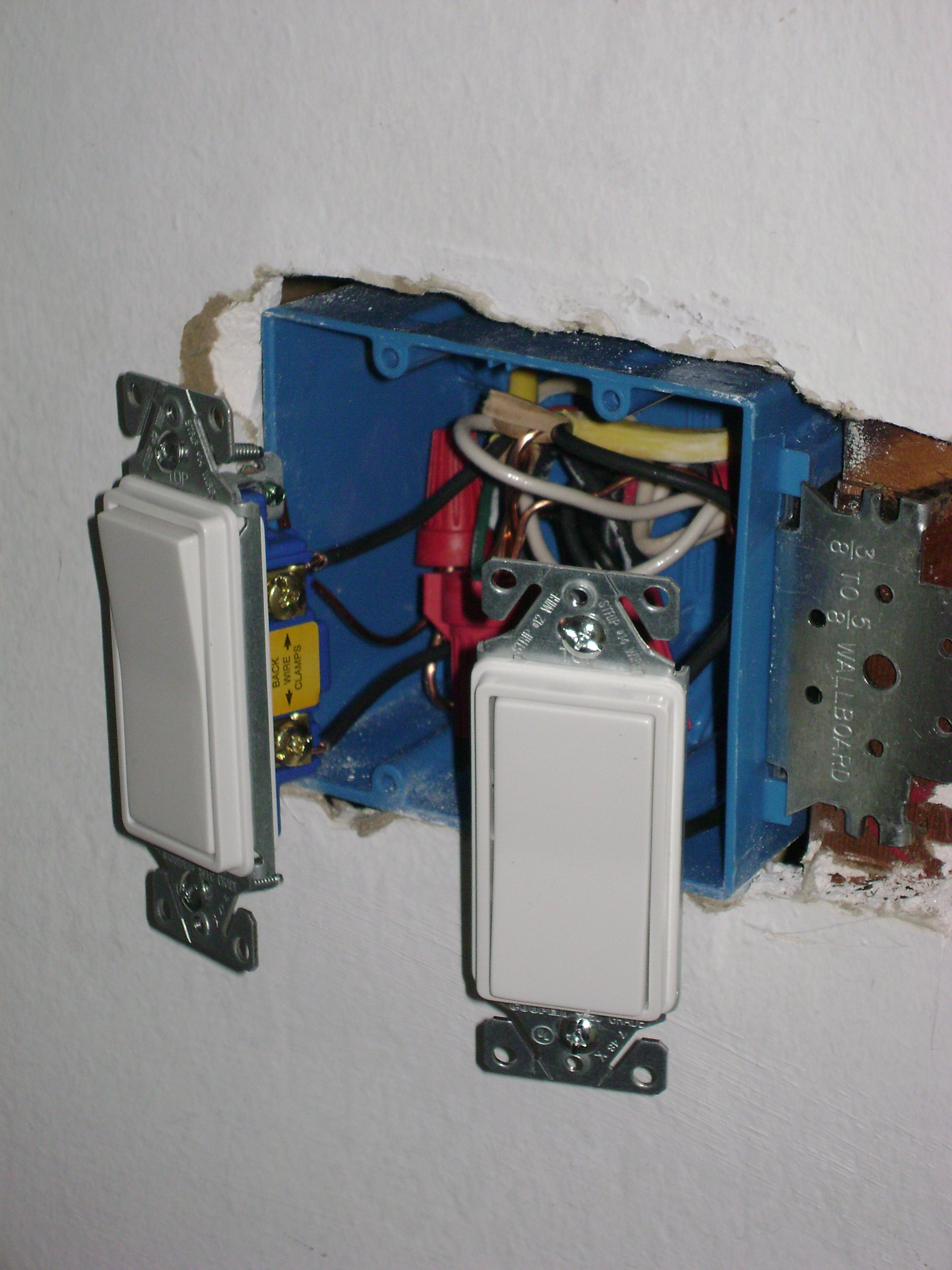
US-style new-work wall box (blue) behind two light switches. Nails attach box to face of stud via metal bracket. Not shown: the corresponding faceplate.

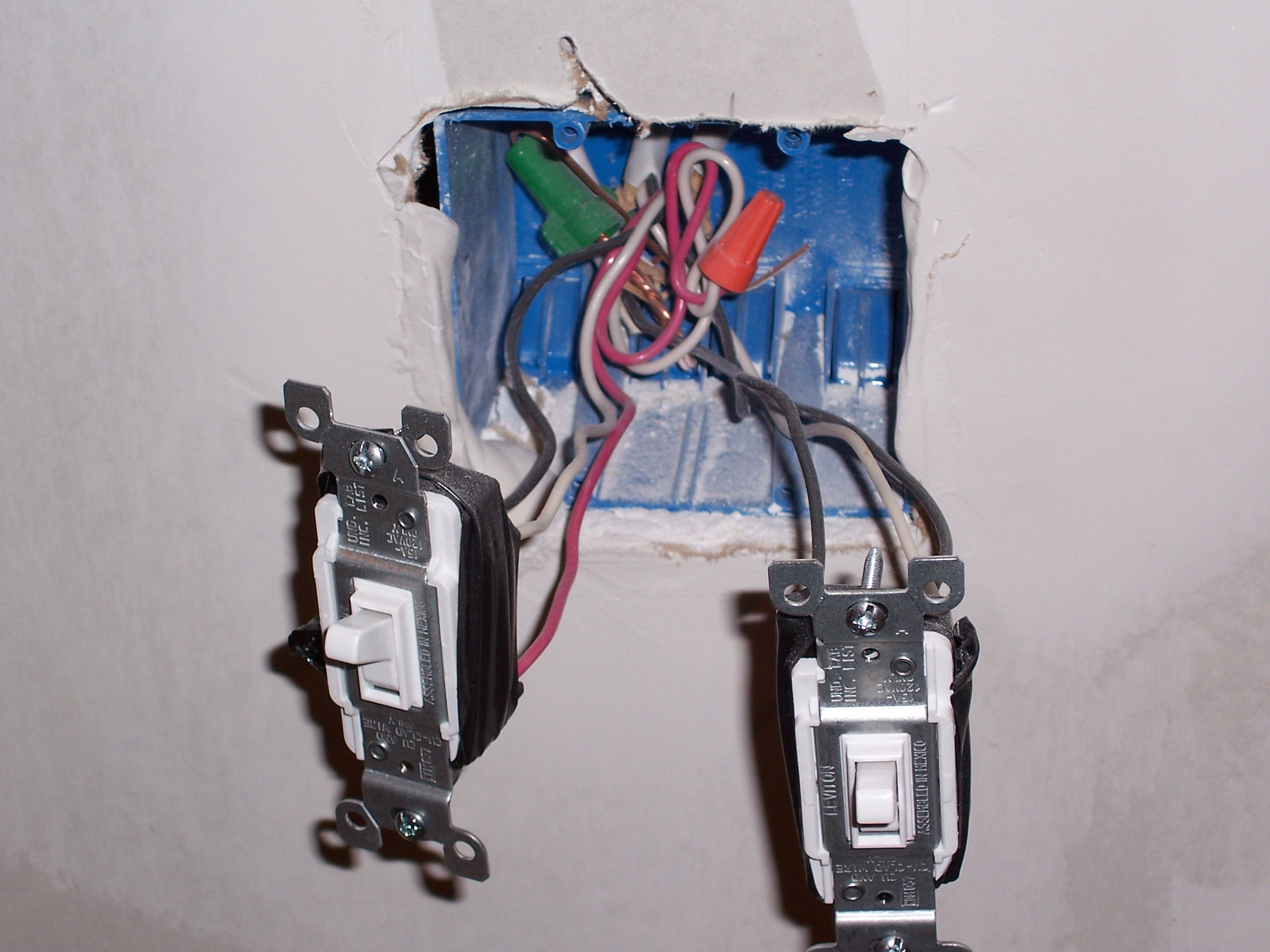
Dual light switches in square wall box

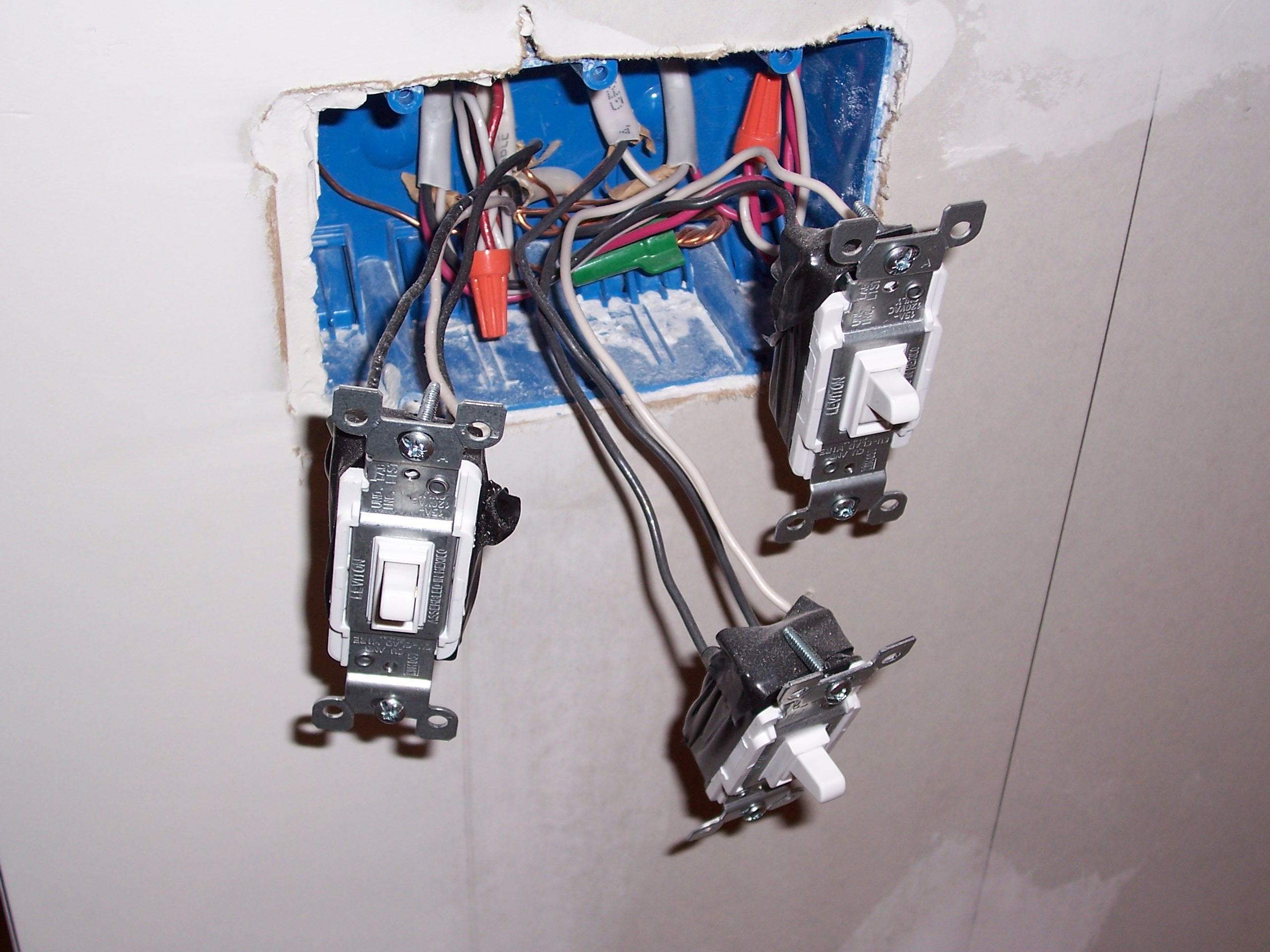
Three light switches in square wall box

=== Europe ===
In most of Europe, outlet boxes are round, with a standard diameter of 68 mm, to accommodate a single insert. This is often a single switch or wall socket, but inserts with two (sometimes even three) switches, a switch and an AC outlet, or two outlets (which protrudes from the wall slightly more than other inserts) are available. The round shape allows the corresponding holes to be simply drilled out with a hole saw rather than requiring a rectangular cavity to be cut out. This is an advantage especially when installing outlet boxes in brick or concrete walls, which are much more common in Europe than in North America.

Boxes intended for drywall always have parsellas, similar to the North American old work type (the distinction between old and new work is not used in Europe), as the round shape of the boxes and prevalence of light-gauge steel framing in modern drywall make nailing to a stud impractical.

Most outlet boxes can be connected to form a chain, limited in length only by the availability of faceplates for the inserts; depending on the product series, between 3 and 5 inserts can be combined in this manner. Some manufacturers also produce 2-gang, 3-gang or 4-gang boxes. The center distance between two inserts is always 71 mm.

Even with those round-hole systems, the faceplates that cover them are mostly rectangular.

Surface-mounted boxes are uncommon and surface-mounted switches or AC outlets are normally used instead.

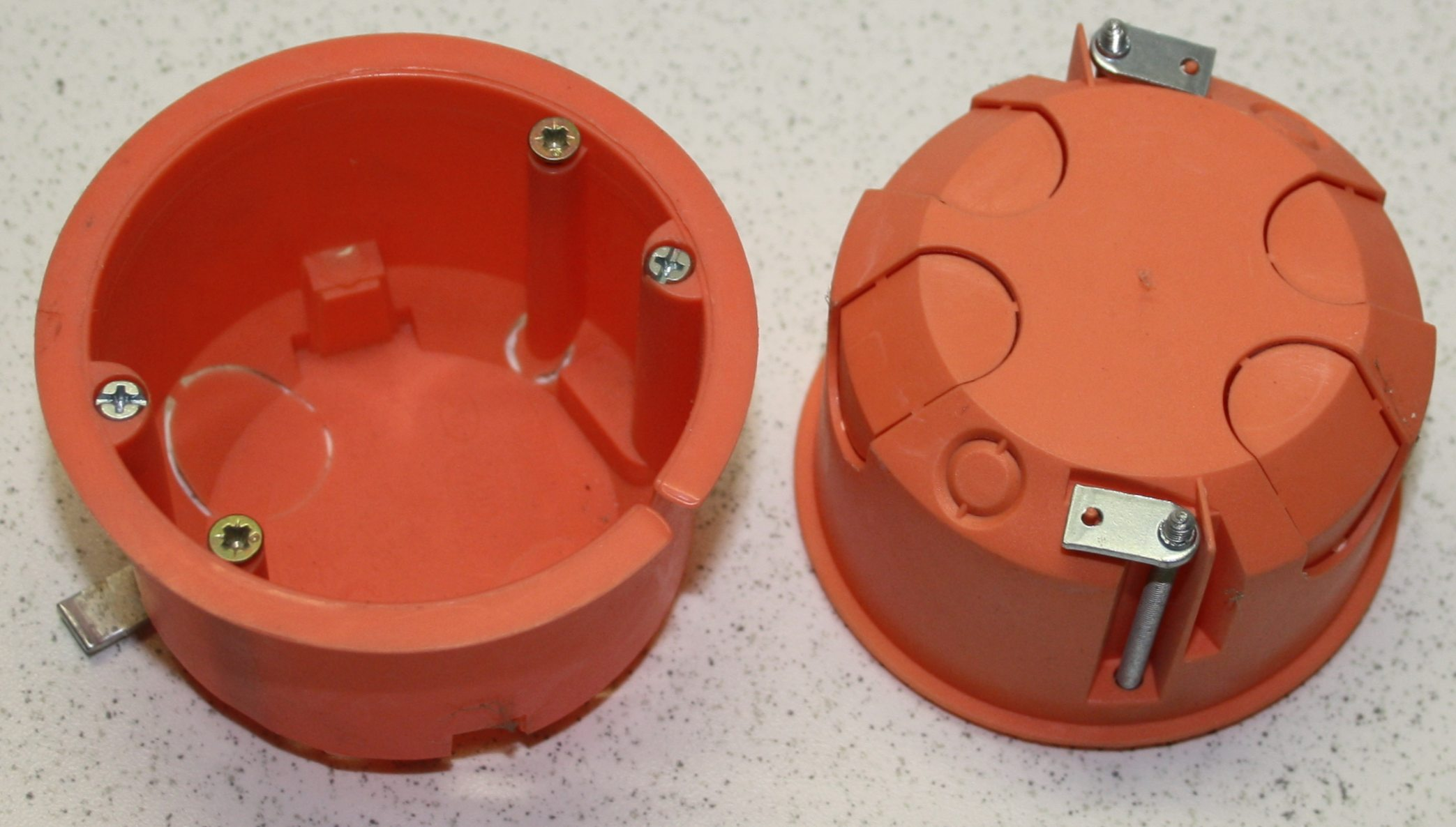
68 mm round outlet box for drywall installation

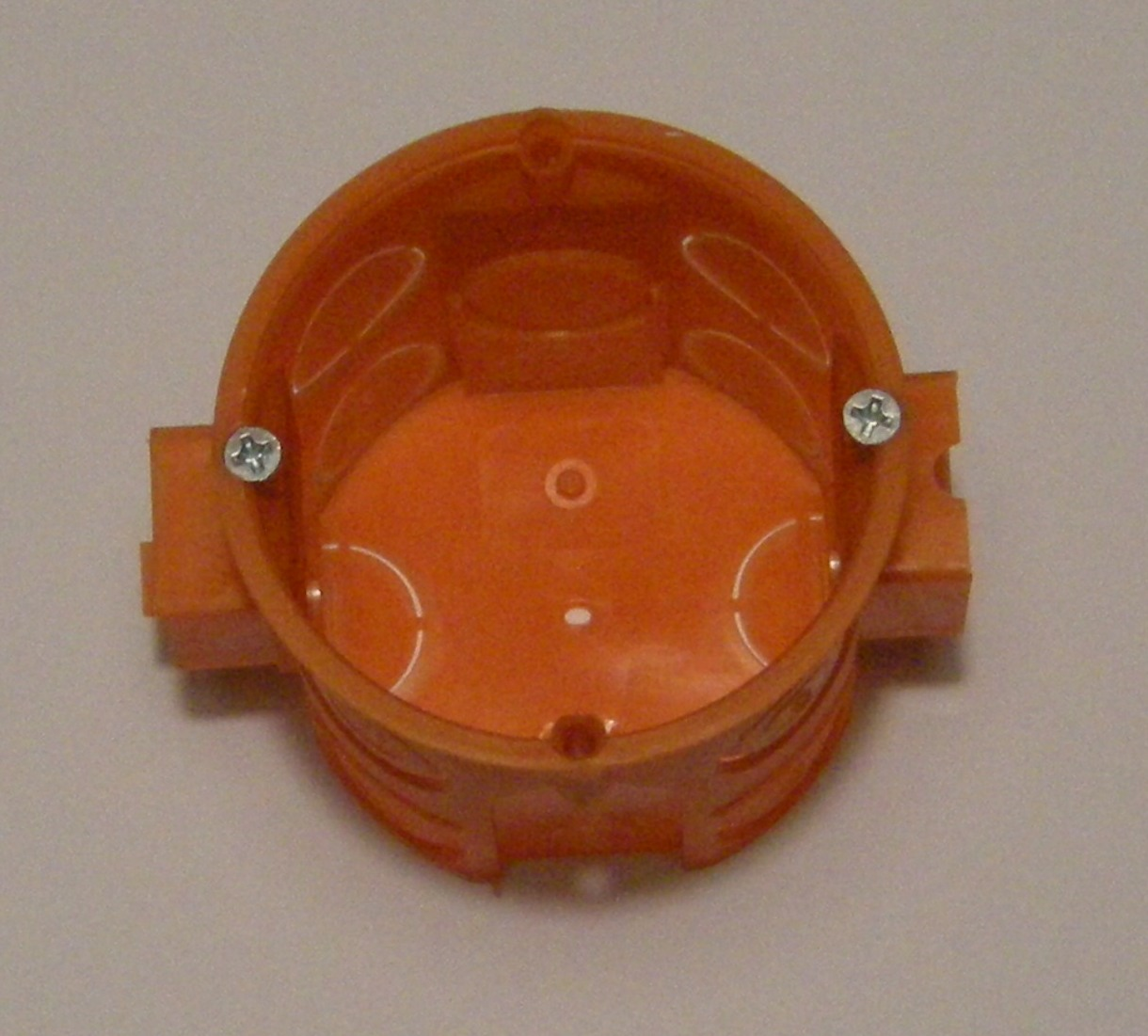
68 mm round outlet box for installation in a brick wall, with connectors on each end to chain multiple boxes together

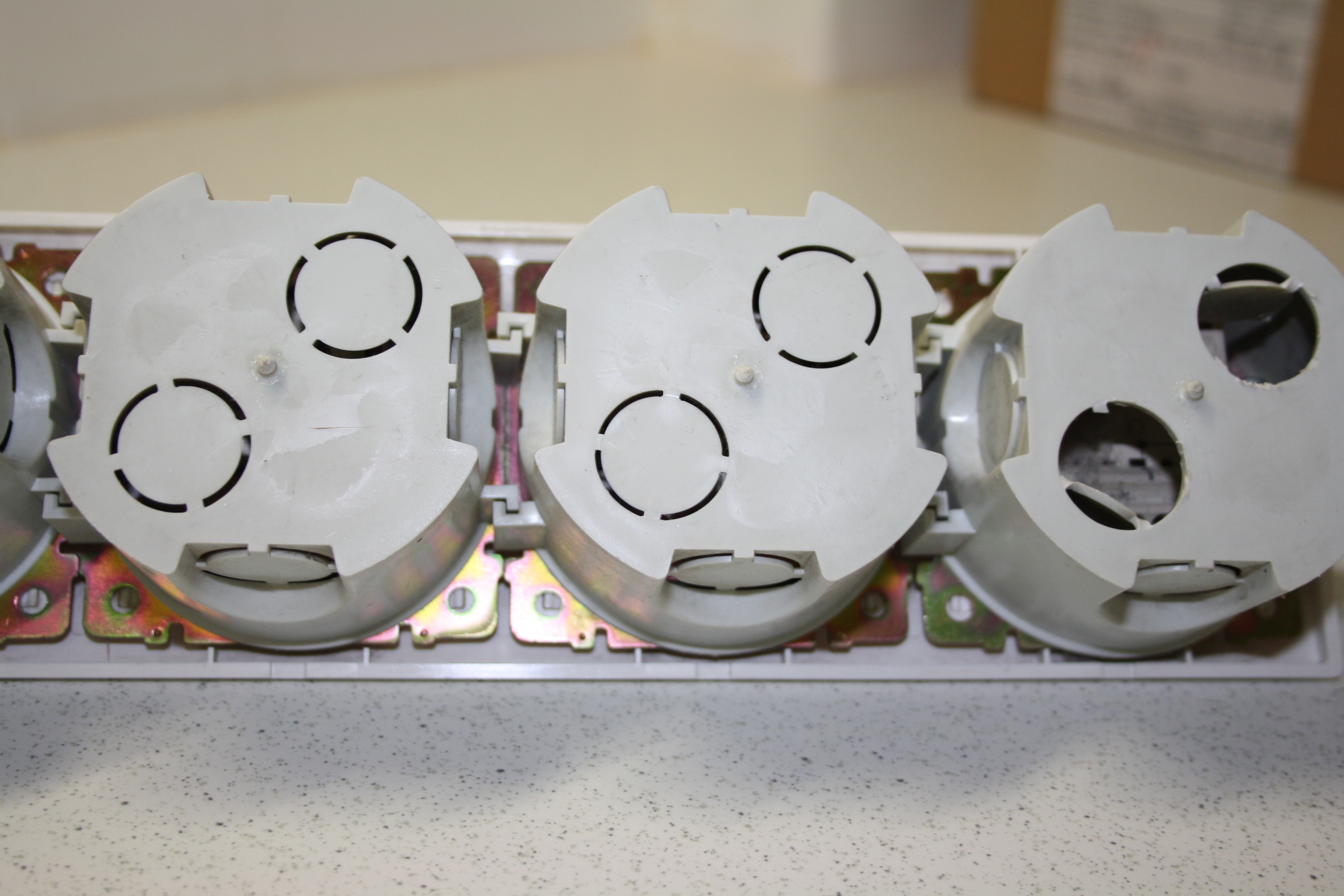
Four boxes connected in a row

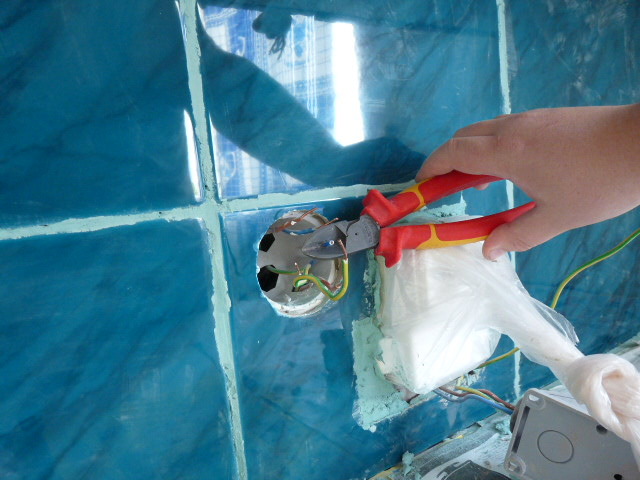
Preparing wires in a round wall box

==== Belgium ====
Single gang boxes for installation in plasterboard are of the standard European type. Boxes for installation in brick walls are rectangular in shape and can be connected to form a chain, similar to their standard European counterparts. For plasterboard, 2-gang, 3-gang or 4-gang boxes are available instead. The center distance between inserts is 71 mm, as in most of the rest of Europe, for horizontal combinations; for vertical ones, it is 71, 60 or 57 mm. Single gang boxes, as well as multi-gang boxes or rows of boxes with a center distance of 71 mm, can accommodate standard European inserts.

==== British Isles ====
In the UK, also in Ireland, outlet boxes are rectangular. Single gang boxes have roughly the same dimensions as the European box and can accommodate European inserts, but usually not vice versa. Larger boxes are also available, to accommodate a 2-gang outlet, as well as boxes to accommodate two inserts side by side. Metal boxes, uncommon in Europe, are available in the UK. The term "back box" (or "backbox") is also often used, sometimes to refer only to a recessed/sub-surface box as distinct from a pattress, but sometimes to refer to either.

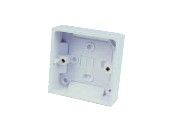
UK-pattern single (1 gang) white plastic surface pattress box

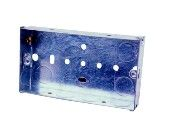
UK-pattern double (2 gang) metal wall box for sub-surface use

==== Italy ====
Italy uses rectangular boxes. Inserts consist of modules, with a center distance of approximately 22 mm horizontally and 45 mm vertically, although some can be double or even triple width, and a mounting frame. The size of the 3-module box, the most frequently used type, was derived from the North American single gang box and is similar enough to be used interchangeably, although Italian boxes are installed horizontally rather than vertically. Two-module boxes are similar in size to those used in Europe and the British Isles, and can be used interchangeably. Other sizes accommodate 4 modules, 7 modules, 2 rows of 3 modules or 3 rows of 6 modules. Single-module boxes are available for installation in metal profiles of modular office walls.

Like in the rest of Europe, there is no distinction between old and new work types, and drywall boxes always have parsellas. They are usually designed so that the cutout can be made with a 68 mm hole saw. Surface-mounted boxes are available, but some switches and AC outlets can be directly mounted to the wall surface without a box.

This type of wall boxes and inserts is also used in Romania and parts of North Africa.

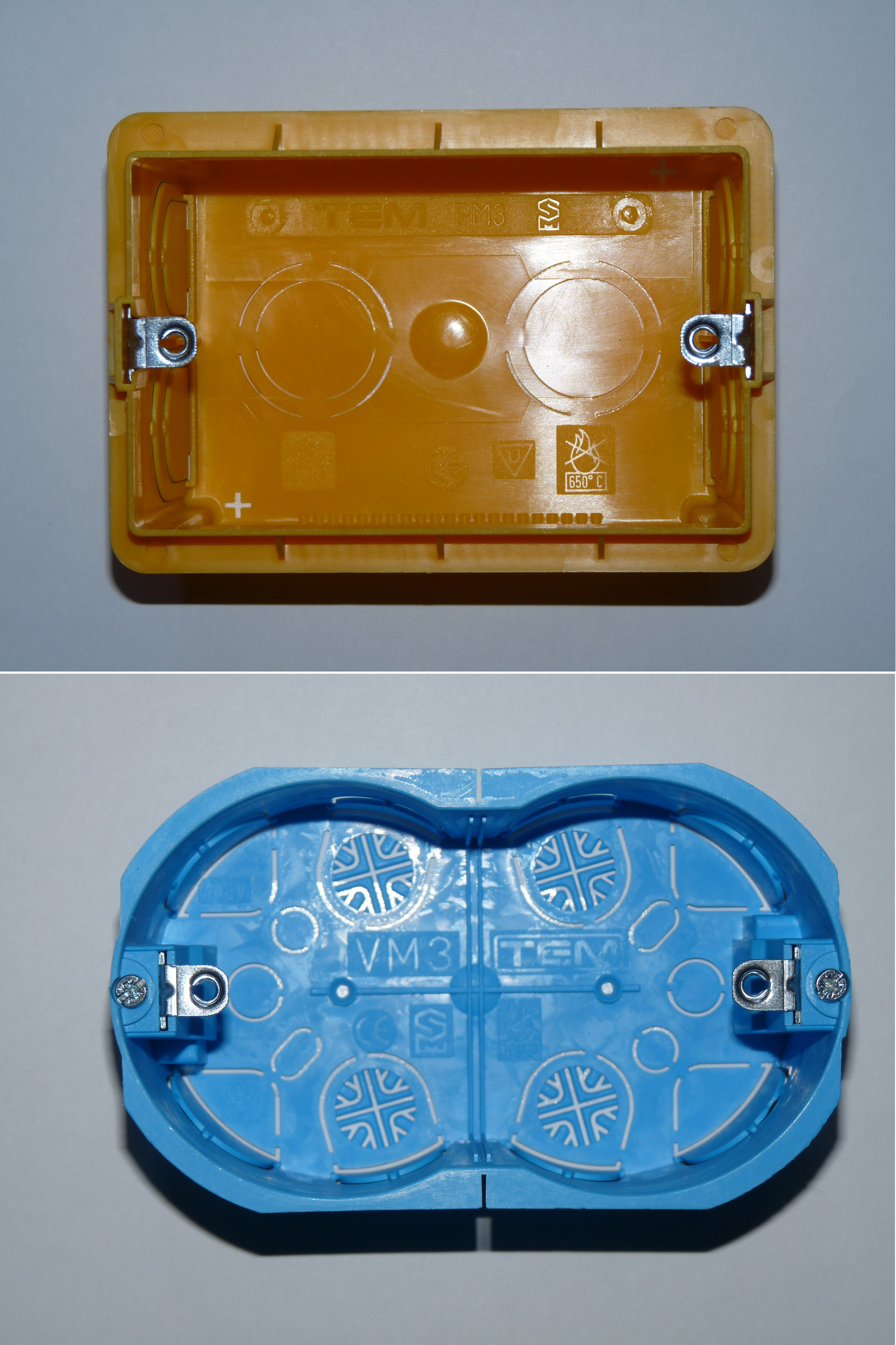
Italian outlet boxes for three modules. The box at the top is for brick walls, the bottom one is for drywall.

== See also ==
- Wall anchor plates are also known as pattress plates.
- Junction box, an enclosure housing electrical connections
- Electrical wiring in the United Kingdom
- Electrical wiring in North America
- Junction box
- Light switch
- AC power plugs and sockets
