= Electrical wiring in North America =

Function and characteristics of building electrical systems in North America

Electrical wiring in North America refers to the practices and standards utilised in constructing electrical installations within domestic, commercial, and industrial sector buildings, and other structures and locations, within the region of North America. This does not include the topics of electrical power transmission and distribution.

== Terminology ==
Although much of the electrician's field terminology matches that of the electrical codes, usage can vary:

- Neutral: A neutral wire is the return conductor of a circuit; in building wiring systems, the neutral wire is connected to earth ground at only one point. North American standards state that the neutral is neither switched nor fused except in very narrowly defined circumstances. The neutral is connected to the center tap of the power company transformer of a split-phase system, or the center of the wye connection of a polyphase power system.

United States electrical codes require that the neutral be connected to earth at the "service panel" only and at no other point within the building wiring system. Formally, the neutral is called the "grounded conductor". As of the 2008 NEC, the terms "neutral conductor" and "neutral point" have been defined to conform to what had been common usage.

- Hot: A hot wire is any line or neutral conductor (wire or otherwise) connected with an electrical system that has electric potential relative to electrical ground or line to neutral.
- Ground: A ground wire is a safety conductor with a low impedance path to Earth. It is often called the "ground wire", or safety ground. It is either bare or has green insulation..
- Leg: A leg as in hot leg, refers to one of multiple hot conductors in an electrical system.
- Outlet: An outlet is defined by the NEC as "a point in the wiring system at which current is taken to utilization equipment". This definition includes receptacles, lighting, motors, etc. Ordinary switches control but do not consume electricity, and therefore are not defined as outlets in this sense.

== Electrical codes and standards ==
=== United States ===
The United States National Electrical Code (NEC) specifies minimum acceptable wiring methods and materials for many states and municipalities. It is sponsored by the National Fire Protection Association (NFPA) and has been periodically revised since 1897. Local jurisdictions usually adopt the NEC or another published code and then distribute documents describing how local codes vary from the published codes. Governments cannot distribute the NEC itself for copyright reasons, though parts that have been adopted into law are not subject to copyright.

The purpose of the NEC is to protect persons and property from hazards arising from the use of electricity. The NEC is not any jurisdiction's electrical code per se; rather, it is an influential work of standards that local legislators (city council members, state legislators, etc. as appropriate) tend to use as a guide when enacting local electrical codes. The NFPA states that excerpts quoted from the National Electrical Code must have a disclaimer indicating that the excerpt is not the complete and authoritative position of the NFPA and that the original NEC document must be consulted as the definitive reference.

New construction, additions or major modifications of or to a building must follow the relevant code for the relevant jurisdiction, which is not necessarily the latest version of the NEC. Regulations in each jurisdiction will indicate when a change to an existing installation is so great that it must then be rebuilt to comply with the current electrical code. Generally existing installations are not required to be changed to meet new codes.

Other code requirements vary by jurisdiction in the United States. In many areas, a homeowner, for example, can perform household wiring for a building which the owner occupies. A few cities have more restrictive rules and require electrical installation work to be done by licensed electricians. The work will be inspected by a designated authority at several stages before permission is obtained to energize the wiring from the local electric utility. The inspector may be an employee of the state or city, or an employee of an electrical supply utility.

=== Canada ===
For electrical wiring in Canada, the Canadian Electrical Code is a very similar standard to that of the United States, published by the Canadian Standards Association since 1927. While developed independently from the NFPA code, is similar in scope and intent to the US NEC, with only minor variations in technical requirement details. Harmonization of the CEC and NEC codes is intended to facilitate free trade between the two countries.

=== Mexico ===
Electrical wiring standards in Mexico follow that of the United States' NEC.

== Design and installation conventions ==
For residential wiring, some basic rules given in the NEC are:

- Terminals for the neutral (grounded) conductor in general, and for receptacles, plugs, and connectors specifically, are required to be substantially white in color (NEC 200.9; NEC 200.10 (B)), and if the terminal itself is not visible, the hole leading to it must be marked with the word "white" or the letter "W". Edison-base lamp sockets (called screw shell devices in the NEC) are required to have the neutral conductor attached to the outer screw shell (NEC 200.10(C)). In actual practice the neutral terminal is silver colored, the line and load terminals are brass or (rarely) painted black, and the grounding screw is usually colored green. A common mnemonic electricians use to remember which wire goes to which terminal is "white to light...black to brass...green to green"..
- A phase wire in a circuit may be any color other than green, gray, or white (whether these are solid colors or stripes). The common colors are black, red, blue, brown, yellow, and orange (high-leg delta). Specific exceptions apply, such as a cable running to a switch and back (known as a traveler) where the white wire will be the hot wire feeding that switch. Another is for a cable used to feed an outlet for 250 VAC appliances that do not need a neutral, for which the white is hot. In both of those instances the white wire should be identified as being hot, usually with black tape inside junction boxes.
- The neutral wire is identified by gray or white insulated wire, perhaps using stripes or markings.
- A lamp cord has one ribbed wire, which is the neutral, and one smooth wire, which is the hot. NEC 2008 400.22(f) allows surface marking with ridged, grooves or white stripes on the surface of lamp cord. With transparent cord the hot wire is copper colored, and the neutral is silver colored.
- The grounding wire of a circuit may be bare (uninsulated), green, or green with yellow stripes. All metallic systems in a building are to be bonded to the building grounding system, such as water, natural gas, HVAC piping, and others.
- Larger wires are generally furnished only in black. These may be properly identified with suitable paint or tape.
- All wiring in a circuit except for the leads that are part of a device or fixture must be of the required gauge or larger. Different size wires may be used in the same raceway so long as they are all insulated for the maximum voltage of any of these circuits.
- The Code gives rules for calculating circuit loading and maximum ampacity.
- Ground-fault circuit interrupter (GFCI) protection is required on receptacles in wet locations and locations where there exists an easy path for fault current to travel to earth. This includes all receptacles intended to service kitchen counter surfaces, crawl spaces at or below grade level, basements, garages and accessory buildings, bathrooms, laundry areas, within 6 ft. of the outside edge of a sink bathtub or shower stall, as well as outdoors. There were previous exceptions for refrigerators because unattended disconnection could cause spoilage of food and for garbage disposals. As of the 2020 NEC this exception no longer exists. Two-wire outlets having no grounding conductor may be protected by a GFCI or one upstream of the receptacle and must be labelled "No Equipment Ground" and "GFCI Protected". Most GFCI receptacles allow the connection and provide GFCI protection for down-stream connected receptacles. Receptacles protected in this manner or with a GFCI circuit breaker should be labeled "GFCI protected".
- Arc-Fault Circuit Interrupter (AFCI) protection is required to protect nearly all finished areas of a home with the exception of bathrooms. This device, which can be a circuit breaker or the first outlet on a circuit, is designed to detect hazardous electrical arcing in the branch circuit wiring as well as in cords and plugs. An AFCI device is designed to trip quickly when it detects potentially dangerous arcing that could start a fire, but not trip with harmless arcing as part of the normal operation of devices such as motors.
- Most circuits have the metallic components interconnected with a grounding wire connected to the third, round prong of a plug, and to metal boxes and appliance chassis.
- Furnaces, electric water heaters, heat pumps, central air conditioning units, electric dryers, electric stoves or cooktops, and built-in microwave ovens must be on dedicated circuits.
- The code provides rules for sizing electrical boxes for the number of wires and wiring devices in the box.

The foregoing is just a brief overview and must not be used as a substitute for the actual National Electrical Code.

== Comparison of US practices with other countries ==
Electrical wiring practices developed in parallel in many countries in the late 19th and early 20th centuries. As a result, national and regional variations developed and remain in effect. Some of these are retained for technical reasons, since the safety of wiring systems depends not only on general technical standards for wiring, but also on those of wiring devices, materials, and equipment.

In North America the most common form of electrical service to residential and small commercial properties is 120 V AC split-phase, whereby a 240 V single-phase supply is put through a transformer which is then centre-tapped, resulting in three wires — a central neutral and two hot legs on either side of it — with 240 V between the two hots, and each hot having 120 V to the centre-tapped neutral. This provides the option for each circuit in the property to be either 240 V (utilising both hot legs without the neutral), or 120 V (utilising one of the two available hot legs with the neutral).

Alternatively some properties, especially in commercial and industrial sectors, will alternatively have a three-phase supply, which will have three hot legs (phases) with 208 V between phases, and 120 V from each phase to neutral. Common three-phase configurations within a building are 208/120 V wye, 120/240 V centre-tapped delta and 480v/277 V wye. Lighting is usually fed by 277 V or 120 V.

In contrast the majority of the world uses a frequency of 50 Hz, and properties are simply supplied with either a 220-240 V AC single-phase supply, or a 400 V AC three-phase supply (400 V between phases, and 220-240 V phase to neutral), without any such centre-tapping. In a property supplied by single-phase, all circuits will be 220-240 V. Properties supplied with three-phase can choose whether each circuit uses all three phases, as suitable to supply industrial three-phase motors for example, or only one of the three phases (combined with neutral), as suitable for most circuits, such as those supplying normal domestic-type power sockets and lighting.

An older, but still widely used, high-leg delta system unique to North America uses three phases with 240 V phase-to-phase for motor loads, and 120 V for lighting loads by use of a centre-tapped transformer. Two of the phases are 120 V to neutral; The third phase, the "high leg" of the system (also referred to as the "wild leg"), has 208 V to neutral and is not usually used for single-phase connections, so is distinctively colored. For larger commercial installations, 277/480 V or 347/600 V three-phase is common.

== Wiring methods ==
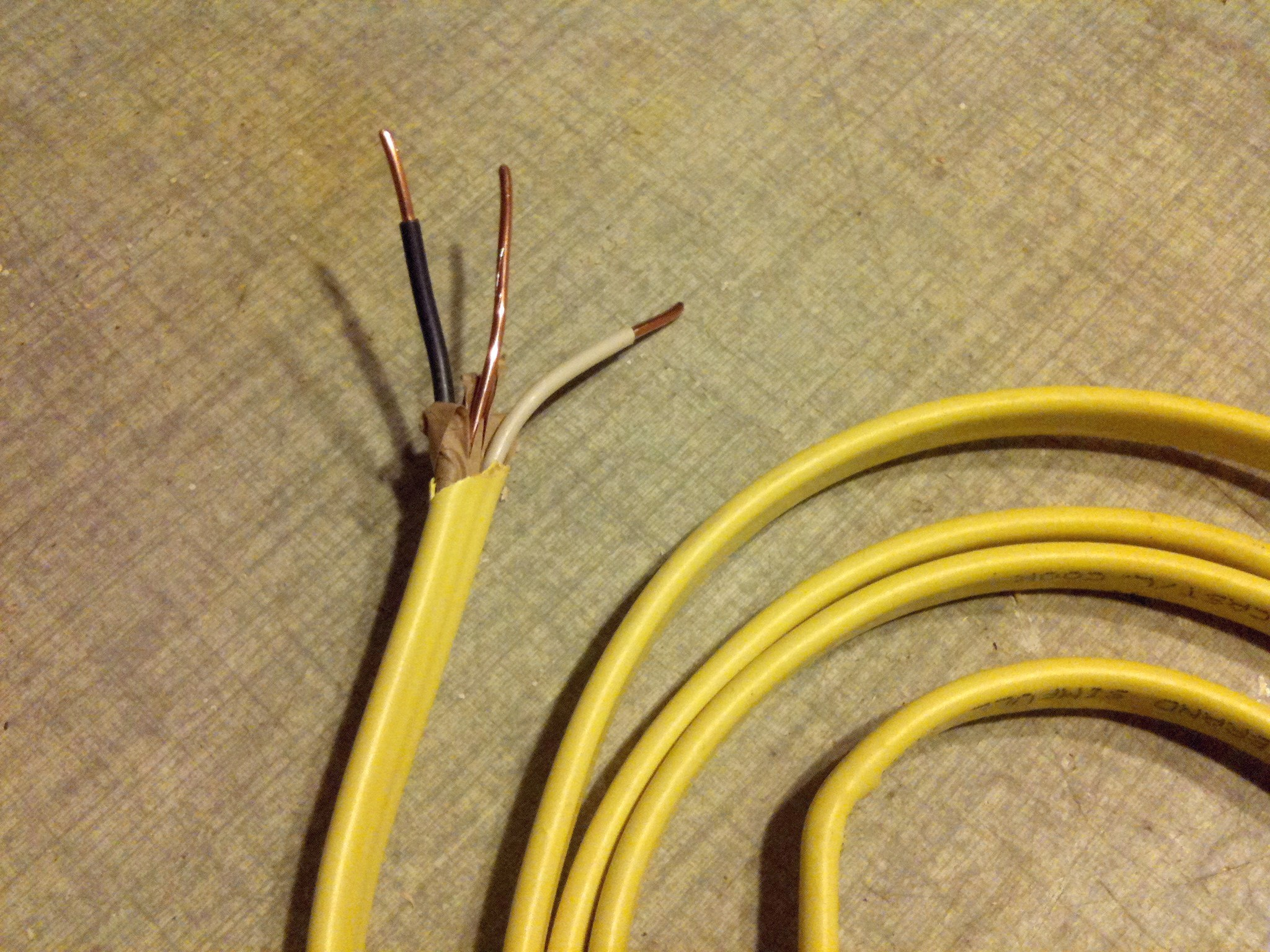
12/2 Non-metallic (NM) sheathed cable

Most circuits in modern North American homes and light commercial constructions are wired with non-metallic sheathed (NM) cable. This type of cable is low cost and appropriate for dry indoor applications. The designation NM XX-Y indicates, respectively, the type of sheathing (in this case, non-metallic), the size of the main conductors, and the total number of circuit conductors (exclusive of the grounding conductor). For example, NM 14-2 cable contains three conductors (two plus one ground) at 14 gauge, a size typically used for circuits protected at 15 amperes. Circuits with larger currents (such as for electric furnaces, water heaters, air conditioners, or sub-mains to additional circuit panels) will have larger conductors. Not all US jurisdictions permit use of non-metallic sheathed cable. The NEC does not permit use of NM cable in large, fire-resistant, or high-rise structures.

In type NM cable, conductor insulation is color-coded for identification, typically one black, one white, and a bare grounding conductor. The US NEC specifies that the black conductor represent the hot conductor, with significant voltage to Earth; the white conductor represent the neutral conductor, near ground potential; and the bare/green conductor is the safety grounding conductor not normally used to carry circuit current. Wires may be re-colored, so these rules are commonly excepted. In 240-volt applications not requiring a neutral conductor, the white wire may be used as the second hot conductor, but must be recolored with tape or by some other method. Four-wire flexible equipment connection cords have red as the fourth color. Unlike older European practices, color-coding in flexible cords is the same as for fixed wiring.

In commercial and industrial, unenclosed NM cable is often prohibited in certain areas or altogether (depending on what the building is used for and local/state building codes), therefore this option is almost never used by commercial electrical contractors. Most wiring is put in non-flexible conduit, usually EMT because of its cost and durability. Rigid conduit may be required for certain areas. Vapor-lock fittings may be required in areas where a fire or explosion hazard is present (such as gas stations, chemical factories, grain silos, etc). PVC can be used where wire is run underground or where concrete will be poured. A duct bank is usually made of multiple PVC conduits encased in concrete. FMC or Flex is used where EMT or other non-flexible conduit is impractical or for short runs, known as "whips", to lights or other devices. For power circuits, the color-coding uses the same colors as residential construction, and adds the additional wires used for three-phase systems. Black, Red and Blue are used for hot wires and White is used as the neutral wire in a 120/208 V circuit. Brown, Orange and Yellow are used as hot wires and gray is used as the neutral wire in a 277/480 V. For grounding, regardless of the voltage, Green (or a bare wire) is used.

Several other types of wiring systems are used for building wiring in the United States; these include corrugated metal armored cable, mineral-insulated cable, other types of power cable, and various types of electrical conduit. In industrial applications cables may be laid in cable trays. Cable type TC is especially intended for use in tray systems. Special wiring rules apply to wet or corrosive locations, and to locations which present an explosion hazard. Wiring materials for use in the United States must generally be made and tested to product standards set by NEMA and Underwriters Laboratories (UL) and must bear approval marks such as those set by UL.

Approved wiring types can vary by jurisdiction. Not all wiring methods approved in the NEC are accepted in all areas of the United States.

== Wire types ==
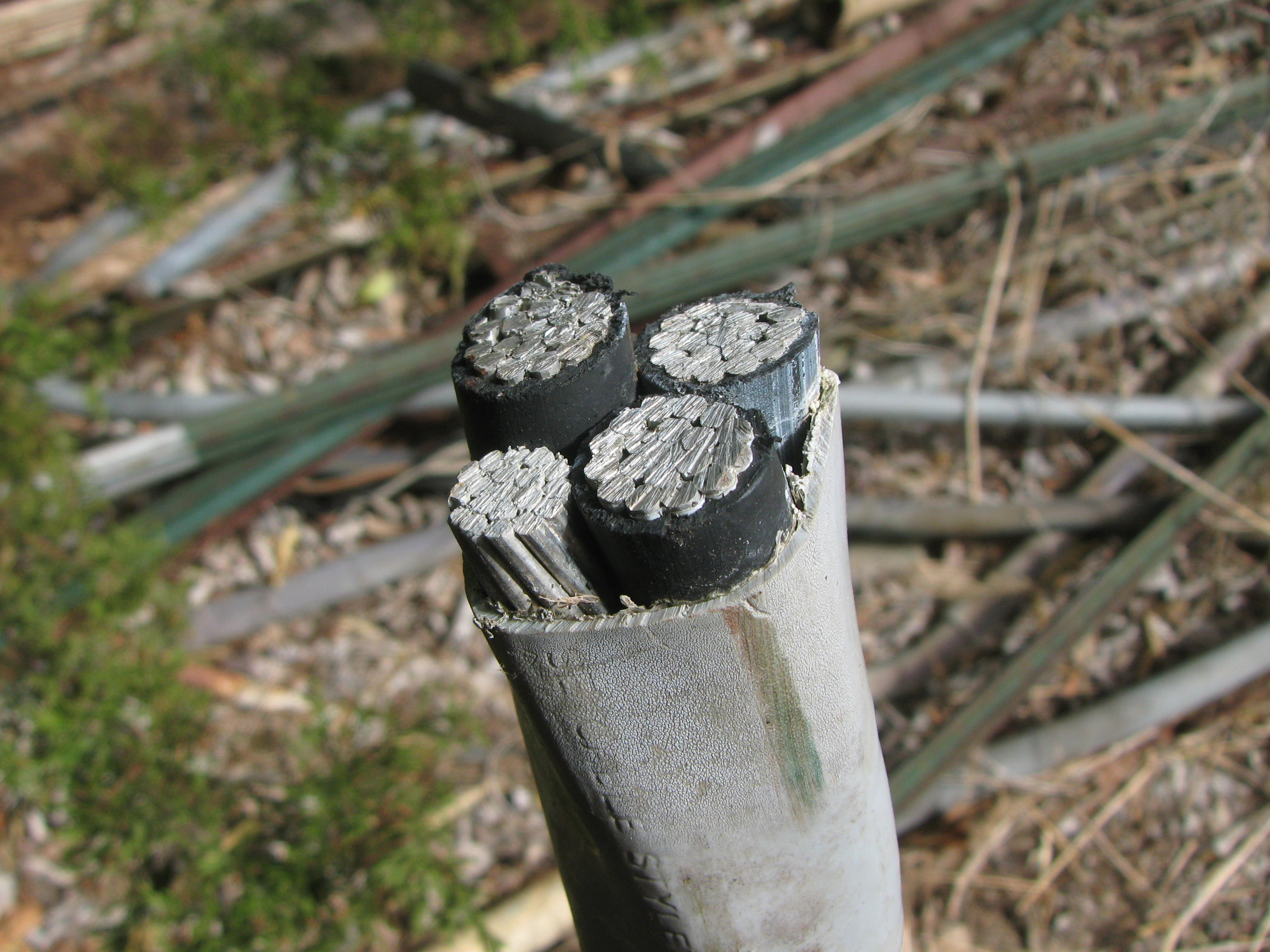
Heavy duty outdoor electrical cable

When running through conduit, such as in commercial applications, it is typical to pull single-core wires rather than multicore cables.

Wire is manufactured in a range of conductor sizes, stranding, and materials (copper or aluminum), but the term "wire type" usually refers to the insulation, which determines the environments in which the wire may be used.

Wire types for North American wiring practices are defined by standards issued by Underwriters Laboratories, the Canadian Standards Association, the American Society for Testing and Materials, the National Electrical Manufacturers Association, and the Insulated Cable Engineers Association.

One important property of a cable affecting its current-carrying capacity is the maximum temperature rating of its insulation. Wire size, in combination with environmental factors affecting heat dissipation, such as ambient temperature and building insulation, determine the amount of tolerable copper loss in the wire, and therefore tolerable load current.

The most commonly used insulation type in AC electrical distribution systems throughout North America is THHN ("Thermoplastic High Heat-resistant Nylon-coated"). This is a specification for PVC insulation (other thermoplastics are permitted, but rarely used) with a nylon jacket for abrasion resistance. THHN is suitable for dry or damp environments and conductor temperatures up to 90 °C (194 °F).

A second popular type is THWN ("Thermoplastic Heat and Water-resistant Nylon-coated"). This is similar to THHN, but rated for dry or wet environments and conductor temperatures up to 75 °C (167 °F), and is commonly used in subsurface conduits which may fill with water.

A lot of THWN wire is actually dual-rated, meeting the THHN specification too, thus may be used in both wet environments up to 75 °C (167 °F), or dry environments up to 90 °C (194 °F).

An extended specification, THWN-2 permits use in wet locations and conductor temperatures up to 90 °C simultaneously.

There are additional restrictions on such wire's use not mentioned here, for example, neither THHN nor THWN may be exposed to sunlight, or directly buried in the ground.

XHHW-2 (XLPE High Heat-resistant Water-resistant") is a less commonly seen insulation type with a thermoset plastic insulation. It has the same moisture and temperature specifications as THWN-2 (the original XHHW was equivalent to THHN/THWN dual-rated insulation), but being a thermoset plastic, it is less affected by temperature, remaining firmer at high temperatures and significantly more flexible at low temperatures. This makes it popular for outdoor wiring applications. The low dielectric constant of the insulation is also beneficial when high-frequency AC is present on the wire, such as the output of variable-frequency drives.

== See also ==
- American wire gauge
- Electrical wiring in the United Kingdom
- Twist-on wire connector
