= HRC =

HRC or hrc may refer to:

== Motorsport ==
- Honda Racing Corporation, the Japanese-based motorsport subsidiary of the Honda Motor Company
- Honda Racing Corporation USA, the North American motorsport subsidiary of the Honda Motor Company

== Transportation ==
- South Atlantic Airways (ICAO airline code)
- Zhayrem Airport (IATA code), Zhayrem, Kazakhstan
- Hercules station (Amtrak station code), Hercules, California, US

== Companies and organizations ==
- Harry Ransom Center, a museum, library, and archive of the University of Texas
- Hellenic Red Cross, the Greek Red Cross Society
- Helsinki Rugby Club, a rugby union team located in Helsinki, Finland.
- Hertford Regional College, a further education college in Hertfordshire
- Human Rights Campaign, an LGBT equal rights organization
- Human rights commission, a body to protect human rights
- United Nations Human Rights Committee, a United Nations body of 18 experts that meets three times a year for four-week sessions
- United Nations Human Rights Council, a United Nations inter-governmental body that includes representation by 47 member states
- United States Army Human Resources Command, a command agency for career management of United States Army and Army Reserve soldiers
- Hill-Rom Holdings (NYSE ticker symbol), US
- Hard Rock Cafe, a chain of theme restaurants featuring rock-and-roll music and memorabilia
- Hollandia Roeiclub, a Dutch rowing club, featured in the movie The Social Network (2010)
- HRC Group, a Bangladeshi conglomerate company

== Science and technology ==
- HRC, the C-scale of the Rockwell scale for measuring the indentation hardness of a material
- HRC (gene), the human gene for the histidine rich calcium binding protein
- Harmonically-related carriers, a cable TV signal modulation technique
- High Resistance Connection, an undesirable phenomenon resulting from loose or poor connections in electrical circuits
- High rupturing capacity, a type of fuse that can safely interrupt a high electric current
- High-Resolution Channel, a feature of the Hubble Space Telescope that has light suppression options to mask out bright astronomical sources
- Hitachi Remote Copy, a remote mirroring feature for data storage arrays

== Other uses ==
- Niwer Mil language (ISO 639 code: hrc)
- Hillary Rodham Clinton (born 1947), former first lady of the United States, senator, secretary of state, and presidential candidate
- HRC: State Secrets and the Rebirth of Hillary Clinton, a 2014 book about Hillary Rodham Clinton
- Hot Rod Circuit, a US indie rock band
