= IEEE C2 =

IEEE standard for National Electrical Safety Code

American National Standard C2 is the American National Standards Institute (ANSI) standard for the National Electrical Safety Code (NESC), published by the Institute of Electrical and Electronics Engineers (IEEE).

The NESC is a document containing voluntary (unless adopted by law) standards for safeguarding persons against electrical hazards during the installation, operation and maintenance of electric supply and communication lines. It includes general updates and critical revisions that directly impact the power utility industry. Adopted by law by the majority of states and Public Service Commissions across the US, the NESC is a performance code considered to be the authoritative source on good electrical engineering practice.

== See also ==
- IEC 60364
- National Electrical Safety Code
- Canadian Electrical Code
- PSE law, Japan Electrical Safety Law.
- Slash rating
- Central Electricity Authority Regulations
