= International Municipal Signal Association =

Traffic standards organization

- Predecessor: International Association of Fire and Police Telegraph Superintendents (IAFPTS)
- Formation: October,1896
- Founded at: Brooklyn, New York
- Merger of: The International Association of Municipal Electricians (IAME), formerly IAFPTS, the Associated Municipal Signal Services (AMSS), and various other organizations in October of 1935.
- Purpose: Advancing the Future of Public Safety
- Headquarters: Rockledge, Florida
- Website: https://www.imsasafety.org/
- Remarks: Thomas A. Edison and the Edison Electric Company were associate members in 1901.

The International Municipal Signal Association (IMSA) is one of the two main professional organizations contributing input to the Federal Highway Administration (FHWA) in revising and developing highway standards concerning traffic signals and control devices.

Primarily these standards are represented by the most current edition of the Manual on Uniform Traffic Control Devices (MUTCD).

Through its members, the IMSA participates on national committees such as the Standards Committee of the IEEE-SA's National Electrical Safety Code (NESC), National Electrical Code (NEC), and the National Electrical Manufacturers Association (NEMA). It is also designated as the FCC designated frequency coordinator for all public safety agencies.

Another function of the IMSA is to develop certification standards and training in areas such as municipal fire alarm system technician, public safety dispatcher, roadway signs and markings, roadway lighting, traffic signal technician, and work zone traffic safety.

== History ==
The organization dates back to October 1896, when municipal signal men representing several cities met in Brooklyn to discuss and share knowledge in construction procedures and maintenance of signal systems. They formed the International Association of Fire and Police Telegraph Superintendents.

In 1900, the name was changed to the International Association of Municipal Electricians (IAME). During the following year, members started to develop standards for wire, cable, and fire alarm boxes—as well as specifications for manhole cover sizes. Thomas Edison is known to have been a member around this time. On 31 August 1913, Charles Proteus Steinmetz was nominated and elected first vice-president of the IAME, an office he held until his death on 26 October 1923.

In 1921, a small group of signal superintendents from Connecticut formed an alternative group called the Eastern Association of Superintendents of Fire and Police Telegraph. As they grew in membership and recognition, they changed the name to the New England Municipal Signal Association. During this period, several similar groups from other areas also began to form and develop independently. In the early 1930s, these groups came together to create the Associated Municipal Signal Services (AMSS).

The IAME and AMSS continued to coexist and grow. Many members belonged to both organizations, as well as to other state or local associations. At its annual conference at Richmond, Virginia in October 1935, the IAME consolidated the many independent associations, drafted by-laws and a new constitution, and changed the name to the National Municipal Signal Association (NMSA). The lead member of each of the former associations was named to the Board of Directors.

In September 1937, as membership of the NMSA expanded beyond the US, the name was officially changed to the International Municipal Signal Association (IMSA). The association now has members in areas of Canada, as well as in a number of other countries.

== IMSA Resources ==
=== IMSA Journal ===
The IMSA Journal is published six times annually and has a circulation of close to 10,000, primarily in the United States and Canada.

=== Frequency coordination ===
The International Municipal Signal Association (IMSA) and the International Association of Fire Chiefs (IAFC) are non-profit associations certified by the FCC to provide frequency coordination services to governmental and related agencies.
