= ACFI =

ACFI may refer to:

- ACFI feedwater heater, a steam locomotive component
- American Committee of the Fourth International, Socialist Equality Party (United States)
- Arc-fault circuit interrupter, a circuit breaker designed to detect an unintended electrical arc
