= Twin Earth =

Twin Earth may refer to:

- Earth analog or Twin Earth, a theoretical other planet with conditions similar to Earth
- Twin Earth thought experiment by philosopher Hilary Putnam, in defense of meaning externalism.
- Twin Earths, a comic strip
- Twin and earth, a type of electricity cable

== See also ==
- Counter-Earth
