= HQL =

HQL may refer to:

- Hibernate Query Language, a language for writing queries against Hibernate data objects
- Tashkurgan Khunjerab Airport (IATA: HQL), Kashgar, Xinjiang, China
- H & Q Life Sciences Investors, a company listed on the New York Stock Exchange
- Handgun Qualification License, under the gun laws in Maryland, United States

== See also ==
- Jakarta Persistence Query Language, an object-oriented query language similar to the Hibernate Query Language
