= Thermoplastic-sheathed cable =

Type of electrical cable for building wiring

A thermoplastic-sheathed cable (TPS) consists of a toughened outer sheath of polyvinyl chloride (PVC) thermoplastic, covering one or more individual annealed copper conductors, themselves insulated with PVC. This type of wiring is commonly used for residential and light commercial construction in many countries. The flat version of the cable, with two insulated conductors and an uninsulated earth conductor (all within the outer sheath), is referred to as twin and earth. In mainland Europe, a round equivalent is more common.

== Description ==
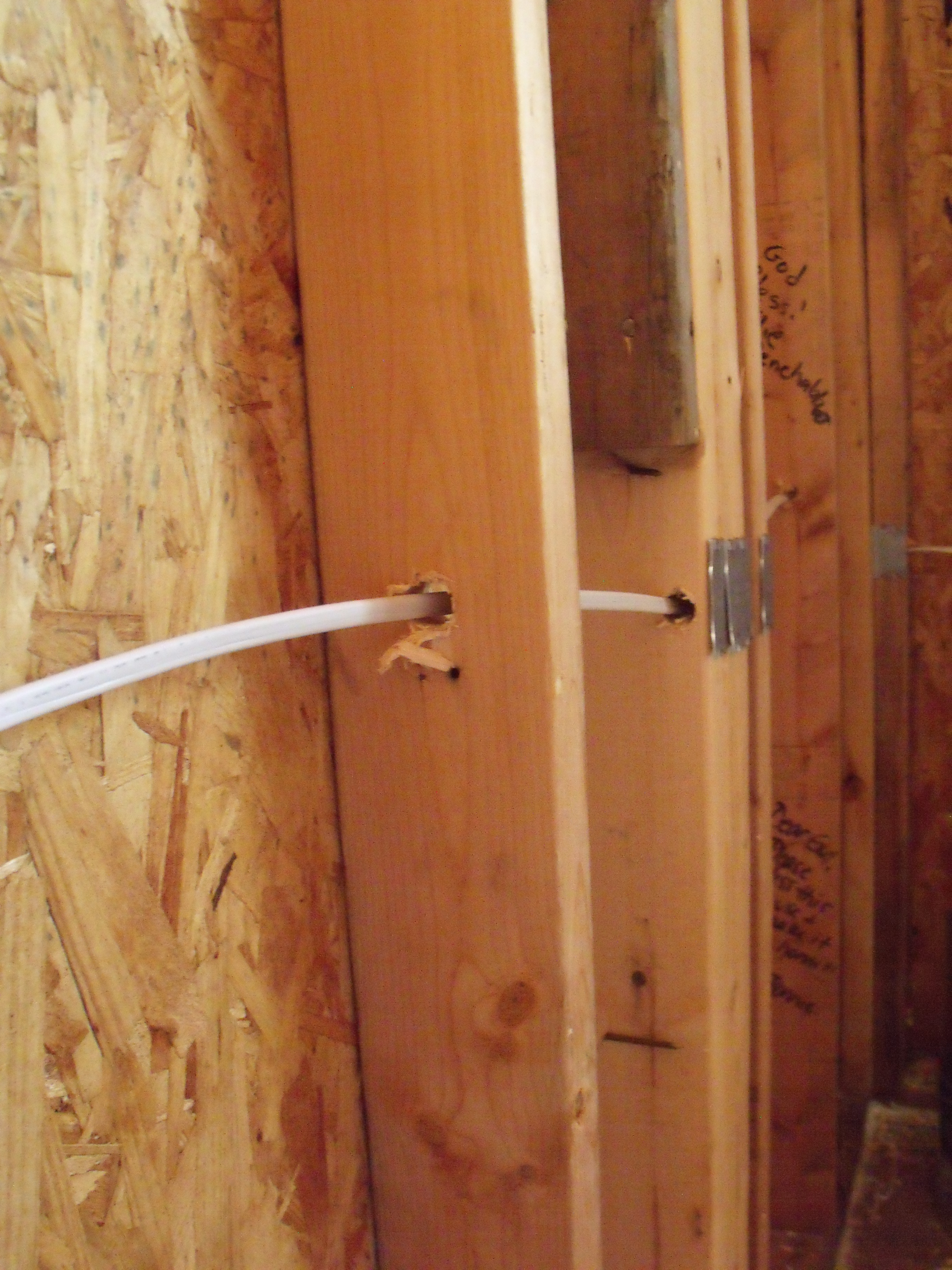
During the "rough in" stage of a wiring project, TPS cable has been run through holes in wooden supports and protective metal plates have been fastened in place.

Each of the current carrying conductors in the "core" is insulated by an individual thermoplastic sheath, coloured to indicate the purpose of the conductor concerned. The protective earth conductor may also be covered with green/yellow (or green only) insulation, although, in some countries, this conductor may be left as bare copper. With cables where the current-carrying conductors are of a large cross sectional area (CSA), the protective earth conductor may be smaller, with a lower continuous current carrying capacity. The conductors used may be solid in cross section or multi-stranded.

The type of thermoplastic, the dimensions of the conductors and the colour of their individual insulation (if any) are specified by the regulatory bodies in the various countries concerned.

Thermoplastic-sheathed cable is more vulnerable to rodent damage and accidental mechanical damage than wiring within electrical conduit or armoured cable.

== Australia and New Zealand ==
In Australia and New Zealand, the colour of the external sheath is usually white for flat TPS or orange for circular TPS but several other colours are available. Wire sizes of 1–6 mm^{2} cross-sectional area (CSA) are available with the outer sheath covering the cores. TPS cable is available in several conductor configurations: single, twin, twin and earth, three and earth, and four and earth, the latter two for three-phase supply. Although available in the larger sizes, solid conductors are rarely used with wire sizes greater than 1 mm^{2} CSA, since the small increase in manufacturing cost of stranded conductors is far outweighed by the relative ease of working with them, especially at the points of termination.

Unlike in North America, the existence of the earth wire within the sheath is always specified if it is present (e.g. twin cable has two conductors and twin and earth cable has three indicated as 2C and 2C+E.) The earth conductor is always stranded (unlike North American usage), with the exception of 1 mm^{2} cables, and covered with green-yellow striped plastic insulation. In older cables the plastic insulation of the earth conductor is green.

Prior to the introduction of TPS cable, tough rubber sheathed (TRS) cable was used. Because of this, TPS is sometimes referred to as "tough plastic sheathed".

Flat TPS is more common than circular, and is used for fixed wiring of domestic and industrial lighting, power outlets, appliances, and HVAC units. Circular TPS is common in industrial and commercial installations but generally not in domestic installations. It may be more difficult to strip the outer sheathing from circular TPS than from flat TPS.

Flat twin and earth conductor TPS cable for single-phase plus earth

Cross-section of same cable, showing three stranded inner wires

Flat three and earth conductor TPS cable for three-phase plus earth

Cross-section of same cable, showing four stranded inner wires

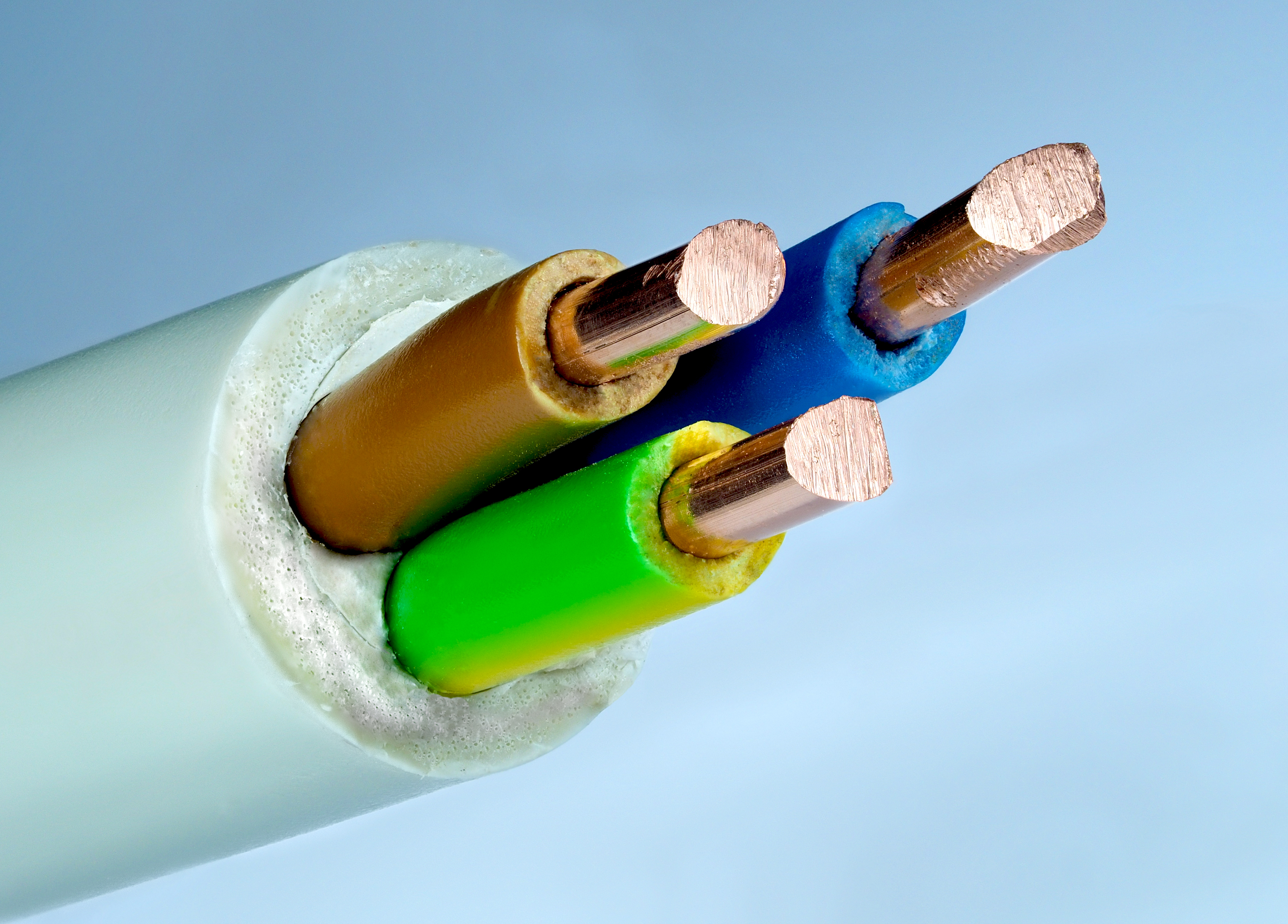
Cross-section of cable showing three solid inner wires

== North America ==
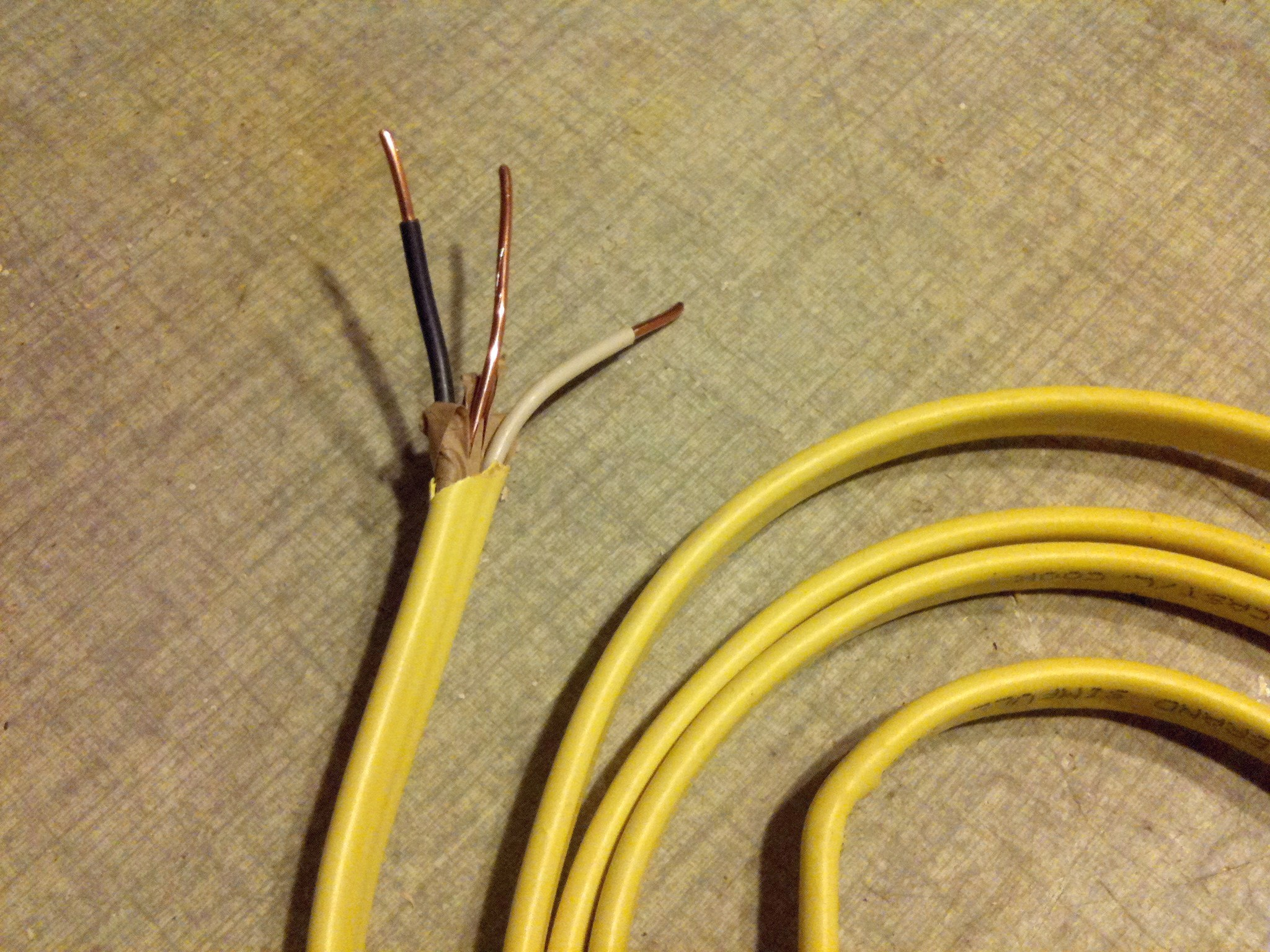
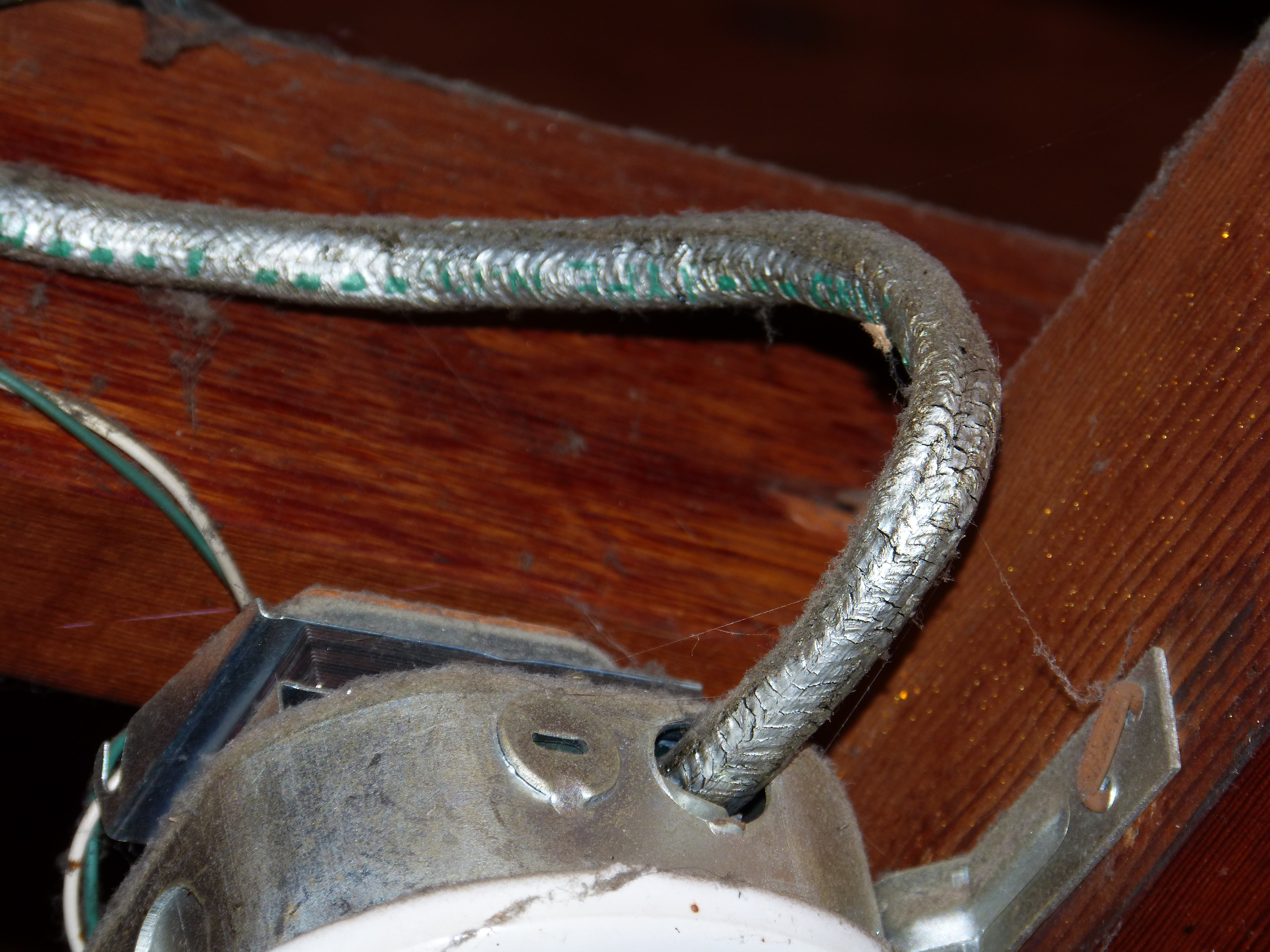
"12/2" NM cable with a yellow colored PVC sheath surrounding two insulated and one bare wires (top) and older cloth-sheathed NM cable (bottom)

In North America, this type of cable is designated as NM cable. NM means "nonmetallic", referring to the outer sheathing; the conductors are still metallic. NM was first listed and described in the NEC in 1926, but it was invented a few years earlier by the Rome Wire Company in 1922 in Rome, New York, and marketed under the trade name "Romex". Today, the name "Romex" is a trademarked brand of the Southwire Company.

The colour of the NM cable sheath (or jacket) indicates either the gauge of the current carrying conductors within it, or special properties of the sheathing itself. Cables found in installations prior to the early 2000s may not conform with this colour coding.

The following are nominal current ratings for copper conductors; long runs may require thicker wires to minimize voltage drop. Common designations is the gauge and conductor count excluding ground: 14/2, 14/3, etc.

North American cables
Colour	American wire gauge (AWG)	Conductors (excluding ground)	Common designation	Current capacity amperes	Year colour introduced
White	14	2	14/2	15	
Blue	14	3	14/3	15	2024
Yellow	12	2	12/2	20	2000
Purple	12	3	12/3	20	2024
Orange	10	2	10/2	30	2000
Pink	10	3	10/3	30	2024
Black	8	2	8/2	40	
Black	8	3	8/3	40	
Black	6	2	6/2	55	
Black	6	3	6/3	55	

Grey: usage for underground installations, designated as "underground feeder" (UF) cables

The outer jacket is labeled with letters that show how many insulated wires are concealed within the sheath. This does not include the uninsulated ground wire. For instance, if the cable lists "12-2 AWG", it means there are two insulated 12-gauge wires (a black and a white wire), plus a ground wire. If the label says "12-3", this cable has four conductors—three 12-gauge insulated wires and a bare copper ground wire.

Different types of cables are approved for different applications; the cable used for interior wiring in dry locations is different from the types approved for underground burial, direct embedment in concrete, or service entrance use.

== Republic of Ireland ==
In the Republic of Ireland the situation is different from that in the UK. Prior to 2013 IS 201-4:2001 ( I.S. 201 part 4: PVC and Low Smoke Halogen Free Sheathed cables for fixed wiring) permitted both the UK style of twin and earth, and also a version with a CPC with a cross-section equal to that of the main conductors and insulated in green and yellow inside the full length of the cable. However, from 2013, the option for the uninsulated and reduced CPC has been removed from the standard IS 201-4:2013, and as such is no longer permitted in new installations in the Republic of Ireland.

== United Kingdom ==
In the UK, thermoplastic-sheathed cable in twin and earth (or T and E) format has the circuit protective conductor (CPC or Earth) uninsulated (bare) and of reduced diameter compared to the main cores. Green and yellow sleeving is sold separately, to be applied at the ends. The cross section on the main conductors is given first, and then the cross-section of the CPC.

Standard UK metric twin and earth cable sizes

- 1/1 mm^{2} and 1.5/1 mm^{2} have solid conductors and CPC (primarily used on low power lighting or alarm circuits)
- 2.5/1.5mm^{2} has a solid CPC and may have solid or stranded conductors (primarily used for socket circuits, radial or ring circuit)
- 4/1.5 mm^{2} and 6/2.5 mm^{2} have stranded conductors and a solid CPC (fixed high power equipment or sub-mains)
- 10/4 mm^{2} and 16/6 mm^{2} have stranded conductors and CPC (fixed high power equipment or sub-mains)

In older properties (pre-1970) cable with imperial sizes are found, sometimes without CPC. Mainland UK wiring regulations do not at present (BS 7671:AMD3) acknowledge twin and earth or flat TPS with a full sized and insulated (G/Y) earth conductor as a valid cable type, which may be awkward for contractors who work cross-border with the Republic of Ireland.

Also available in smaller conductor sizes are versions containing three current-carrying conductors and a circuit protective (earth) conductor. These configurations are commonly used for applications such as switched light circuits, battery-backed emergency lighting which requires a switched and unswitched supply, extractor fans with a run-on timer which require a switched and unswitched supply, mains-powered interlinked smoke alarms, and central heating thermostats.

There is an overall sheath of grey PVC (BS 6004), or white for low smoke compound (BS 7211), although prior to 2005 white PVC was also available.

== See also ==
- Electrical wiring
- Electrical wiring in North America
- Tough rubber-sheathed cable
