= Tough rubber-sheathed cable =

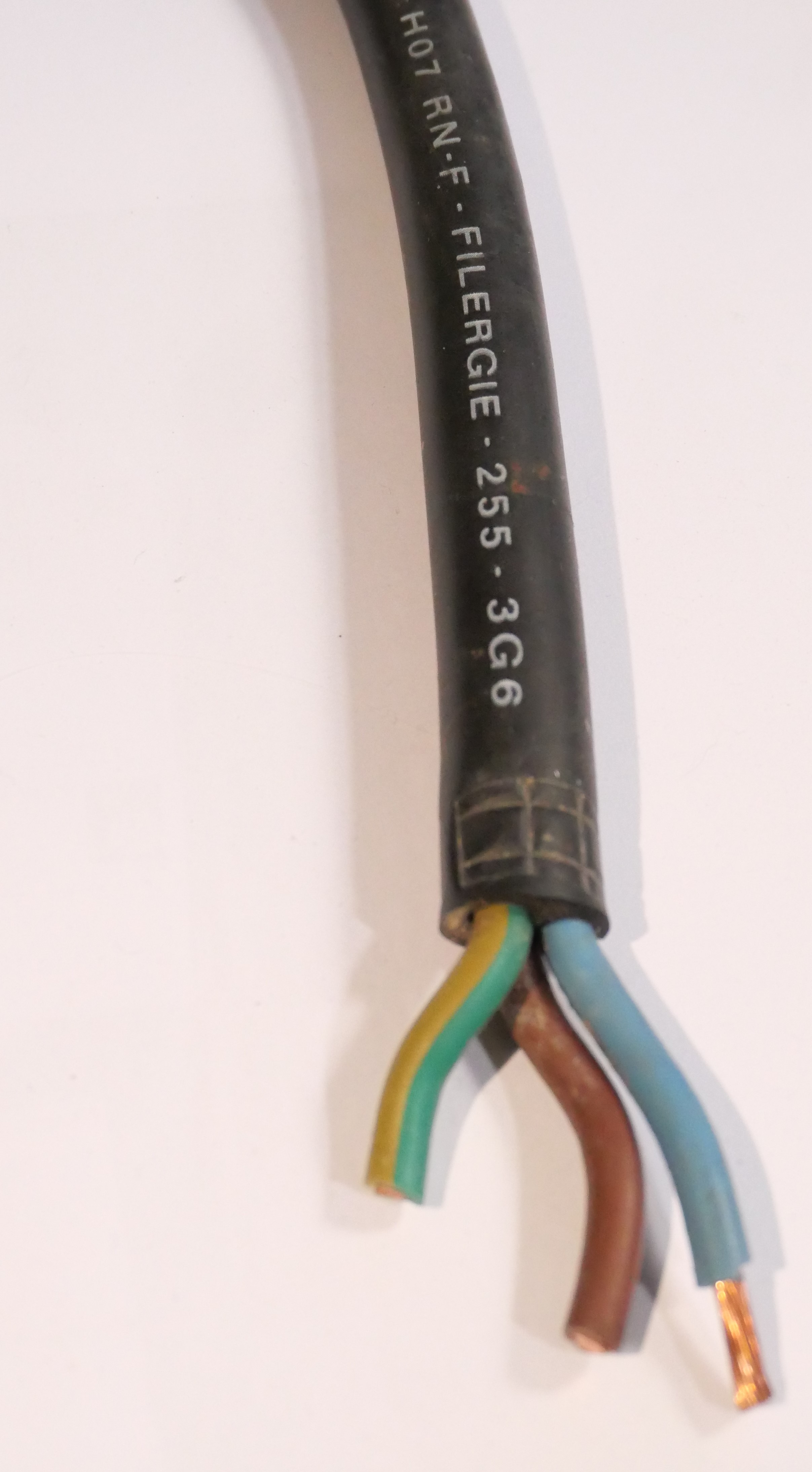
A piece of 3 x 6mm sq H07RN-F flexible cable.

Tough rubber-sheathed cable is a type of cable which normally consists of a black outer sheath of rubber with several conductors inside. The rubber provides an abrasion-resistant, corrosion-resistant, waterproof, protective covering for an insulated electric cable.

Though obsolete for domestic use, it is used for flexible cables when greater mechanical toughness than PVC is required such as temporary electrical wiring at events where the cable is standardised as Cenelec code H07RN-F (H07 for short)

The American National Electrical Code, for theater use, requires (article 520.68(A).1) cables to be "extra hard usage" rated, and such cable is generally known in the US as SOOW cable. Cables meeting the SOOW spec can also be manufactured to be rated as H07RN-F, so-called "harmonised" cable, and such cable can be used both in the US and Europe.

== See also ==
- Thermoplastic-sheathed cable
