= Arc-fault circuit interrupter =

Circuit breaker that protects against intermittent faults associated with arcing

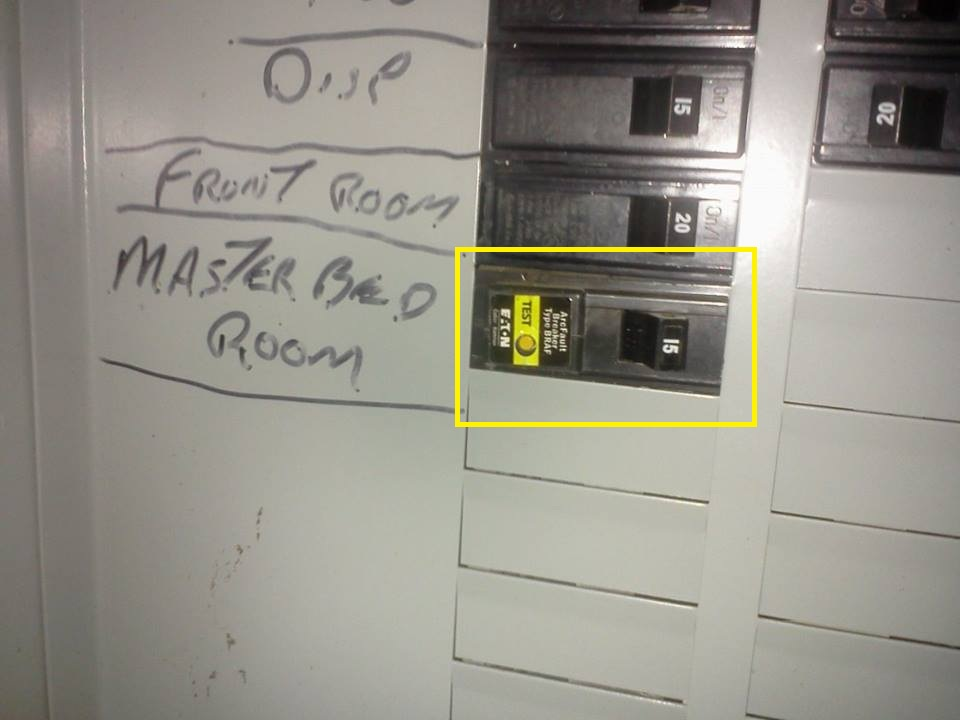
This AFCI (the circuit breaker with the yellow label) is an older generation AFCI circuit breaker. The current (as of 2013) devices are referred to as "combination type."

An arc-fault circuit interrupter (AFCI) or arc-fault detection device (AFDD) is a circuit breaker that breaks the circuit when it detects the electric arcs that are a signature of loose connections in home wiring. Loose connections, which can develop over time, can sometimes become hot enough to ignite house fires. An AFCI selectively distinguishes between a harmless arc (incidental to normal operation of switches, plugs, and brushed motors), and a potentially dangerous arc (that can occur, for example, in a lamp cord which has a broken conductor).

In Canada and the United States, AFCI breakers have been required by the electrical codes for circuits feeding electrical outlets in residential bedrooms since the beginning of the 21st century; the US National Electrical Code has required them to protect most residential outlets since 2014, and the Canadian Electrical Code has since 2015.

In regions using 230 V, the combination of higher voltage and lower load currents lead to different conditions being required to initiate an arc fault that does not either burn clear or weld to a short circuit after a short time, and there are different arc characteristics once struck. Because of this, in Western Europe (where in many countries a domestic supply may be 400V 3 phase) and the UK (where domestically a single phase 230V supply is common), adoption is slower, and their use is optional, only being mandated in specified high risk locations. The Australian and New Zealand regulations – Wiring Rules (AS NZS 3000:2018) do not require installation of AFDDs in Australia. However, in New Zealand all final sub-circuits with ratings up to 20 A will require protection by an AFDD if they supply locations with significant fire risk, locations containing irreplaceable items, certain historic buildings, and socket-outlets in school sleeping accommodation. Most sockets in these countries are on circuits rated at 20 A or less.

In the US, arc faults are said to be one of the leading causes for residential electrical fires. Each year in the United States, over 40,000 fires are attributed to home electrical wiring. These fires result in over 350 deaths and over 1,400 injuries each year.

Conventional circuit breakers respond only to overloads and short circuits, so they do not protect against arcing conditions that produce erratic, and often reduced current. AFCIs are devices designed to protect against fires caused by arcing faults in the home electrical wiring. The AFCI circuitry continuously monitors the current and discriminates between normal and unwanted arcing conditions. Once detected, the AFCI opens its internal contacts, thus de-energizing the circuit and reducing the potential for a fire to occur.

== Operating principle ==
The electronics inside an AFCI breaker detect electrical current alternating at characteristic frequencies, usually around 100 kHz, known to be associated with wire arcing, which are sustained for more than a few milliseconds. A combination AFCI breaker provides protection against parallel arcing (line to neutral), series arcing (a loose, broken, or otherwise high resistance segment in a single line), ground arcing (from line or neutral to ground), overload, and short circuit. The AFCI will open the circuit if dangerous arcing is detected.

When installed as the first outlet on a branch circuit, AFCI receptacles provide series arc protection for the entire branch circuit. They also provide parallel arc protection for the branch circuit starting at the AFCI receptacle. Unlike AFCI breakers, AFCI receptacles may be used on any wiring system regardless of the panel.

== Electrical code requirements ==
=== US and Canada ===
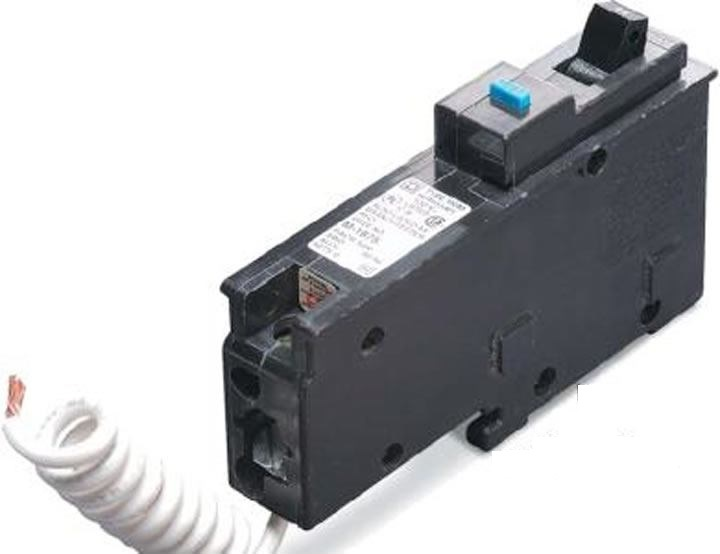
American-standard AFCI (arc-fault circuit interrupter) unit circa 2018. The white 'pigtail' is a low-power neutral connection, hard-wired into the unit.

Starting with the 1999 version of the National Electrical Code in the United States, and the 2002 version of the Canadian Electrical Code in Canada, the national codes require AFCIs in all circuits that feed outlets in bedrooms of dwelling units. As of the 2014 NEC, AFCI protection is required on all branch circuits supplying outlets or devices installed in dwelling unit kitchens, along with the 2008 NEC additions of family rooms, dining rooms, living rooms, parlors, libraries, dens, bedrooms, sunrooms, recreation rooms, closets, hallways, laundry areas, and similar rooms and areas. They are also required in dormitory units. This requirement may be accomplished by using a "combination type" breaker—a specific kind of circuit-breaker defined by UL 1699—in the breaker panel that provides combined arc-fault and overcurrent protection or by using an AFCI receptacle for modifications/extensions, as replacement receptacles or in new construction, at the first outlet on the branch. Not all U.S. jurisdictions have adopted the NEC's AFCI requirements so it is important to check local code requirements.

The AFCI is intended to prevent fire from arcs. AFCI circuit breakers are designed to meet one of two standards as specified by UL 1699: "branch" type or "combination" type (note: the Canadian Electrical Code uses different terminology but similar technical requirements). A branch type AFCI trips on 75 amperes of arcing current from the line wire to either the neutral or ground wire. A combination type adds series arcing detection to branch type performance. Combination type AFCIs trip on 5 amperes of series arcing.

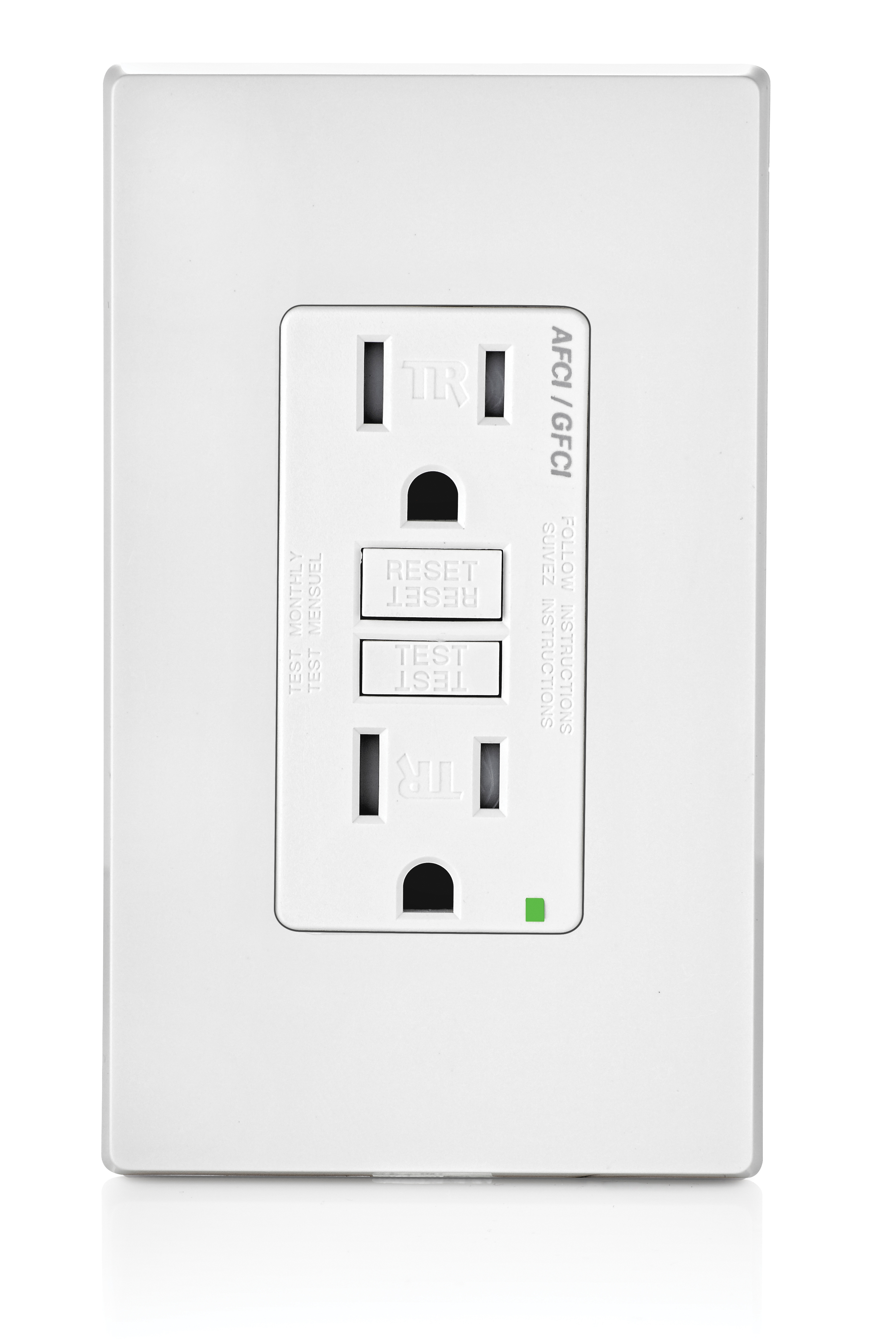
Dual-function AFCI GFCI (ground fault circuit interrupter) 110 volt receptacle circa 2016

AFCI receptacles are an alternative solution to AFCI breakers. These receptacles are designed to address the dangers associated with both types of potentially hazardous arcing: parallel and series. AFCI receptacles offer the benefit of localized test and reset with such buttons located on the face of the device. This can save a journey to the breaker panel but can also encourage simply resetting by a user without investigating the underlying fault, as would presumably happen if someone with access to the electrical panel was notified.

In 2002, the NEC removed the word "receptacle", leaving "outlets", with the effect that lights and other wired-in devices such as ceiling fans within bedrooms were added to the requirement. The 2005 code made it clearer that all outlets must be protected despite discussion in the code-making panel about excluding bedroom smoke detectors from the requirement. "Outlets" as defined in the NEC includes receptacles, light fixtures and smoke alarms, among other things. Basically, any point where AC electricity is used to power something is an outlet.

As of January 2008, only "combination type" AFCIs meet the NEC requirement. The 2008 NEC requires the installation of combination-type AFCIs in all 15 and 20 ampere residential circuits with the exception of laundries, kitchens, bathrooms, garages, and unfinished basements, though many of these require GFCI protection. The 2014 NEC adds kitchens and laundry rooms to the list of rooms requiring AFCI circuitry, as well as any devices (such as lighting) requiring protection.

As of January 2023, there are a total of 6 means of protection covered as part of 210.12(A). These include the following:

1. A listed combination-type AFCI which is the primary method used to meet these requirements.

2. A listed branch/feeder-type AFCI that is installed at the origin of the branch circuit working in combination with the listed outlet branch-circuit-type AFCI (OBC AFCI) installed at the first outlet box which must also be marked that it is the first outlet box of the branch circuit.

3. This option includes a listed "Supplemental Arc Protection Circuit Breaker" which does not exist. There is no standard for this device and so this is not an option that can be used.

4. This option does have a single manufacturer who has a solution on the market. This option includes a listed outlet branch-circuit-type AFCI that is installed on the branch circuit at the first outlet in combination with a listed branch-circuit overcurrent protective device when the following four conditions are met: (a) The "Home Run" circuit must be continuous from the branch circuit overcurrent device to the OBC AFCI. (b) Maximum length for a 14 AWG conductor is 50 ft and the maximum length for a 12 AWG conductor is 70ft. (c) The first outlet box has to be marked as such. (d) The circuit breaker and the OBC AFCI must be listed to meet the requirements of a system combination-type AFCI.

Options 5 and 6 are the same options as we've seen in this section in the past but just included as positive text instead of being an exception.

These options are required for the following areas in dwelling units:

(1) Kitchens

(2) Family rooms

(3) Dining rooms

(4) Living rooms

(5) Parlors

(6) Libraries

(7) Dens

(8) Bedrooms

(9) Sunrooms

(10) Recreation rooms

(11) Closets

(12) Hallways

(13) Laundry areas

(14) Similar areas

=== United Kingdom ===
In the UK, the Wiring Regulations 18th edition (BS 7671:2018) is the first edition to make any mention of arc fault devices, and indicate they may be installed if the design has an unusually high risk of fire from arc faults. The annexes relating to testing indicate that when AFDDs are installed, their correct operation must be verified before completion, but the method of testing is not described. This is in contrast to RCDs where a number of trip times at different fault current levels must be verified.

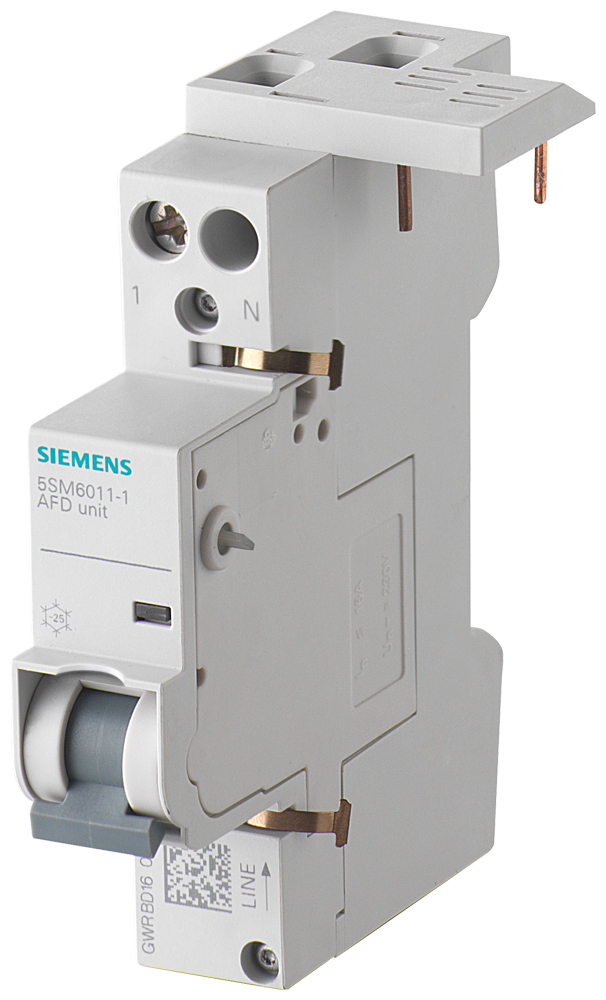
AFDD combination circuit breaker circa 2012

=== Germany ===
The German Wiring rules VDE 0100, recommend AFDDs for high-risk situations and give as examples rooms with sleeping accommodation, rooms or places with a particular fire risk, rooms or places made of building components with combustible building materials, if these have a lower fire resistance than fire-retardant (< F30), and rooms or places with hazards for irreplaceable goods.

=== Australia and New Zealand ===
The Australian and New Zealand regulations – Wiring Rules (AS NZS 3000:2018) do not require installation of AFDDs in Australia. However, in New Zealand all final sub-circuits with ratings up to 20 A will require protection by an AFDD if they supply locations with significant fire risk, locations containing irreplaceable items, certain historic buildings, and socket-outlets in school sleeping accommodation. Most power circuits in these countries fall under this clause as the common sockets are 10 A and 15 A rating. The Australian standards are used in Argentina, Fiji, Tonga, Solomon Islands and Papua New Guinea.

== Limitations ==
AFCIs are designed to protect against fires caused by electrical arc faults. While the sensitivity of the AFCIs helps in the detection of arc faults, these breakers can also indicate false positives by identifying normal circuit behaviors as arc faults. For instance, lightning strikes provide voltage and current profiles that resemble arc faults, and vacuum cleaners and some laser printers trip AFCIs. This nuisance tripping reduces the overall effectiveness of AFCIs. Research into advancements in this area is being pursued.

AFCIs are also known to be sensitive (false tripping) to the presence of radio frequency energy, especially within the high frequency (HF) spectrum (3–30 MHz), which includes legitimate shortwave broadcasting, over-the-horizon aircraft and marine communications, amateur radio, and citizens band radio operations. Sensitivities and mitigation have been known since 2013.

AFCI circuit breakers include a standard inverse-time circuit breaker but provide no specific protection against "glowing" connections (also known as a high resistance connection), high line voltages, or low line voltages.

An AFCI does not detect high line voltage caused by an open neutral in a multiwire branch circuit. A multiwire branch circuit uses both energized wires of a 120–240 V split phase service. If the neutral is broken along the return path to the circuit breaker panel, devices connected from a 120 V leg to the neutral may experience excess voltage, up to twice normal.

AFCIs do not detect low line voltage. Low line voltage can cause electromechanical relays to repeatedly turn off and on, or "chatter". If current is flowing through the load contacts, it causes arcing across the contacts as they open. The arcing can oxidize, pit, and melt the contacts. This process can increase the contact resistance, superheat the relay, and lead to fires. Power fault circuit interrupters are designed to prevent fires from low voltage across loads.

== Interference with power line networking ==
AFCIs may interfere with the operation of some power line communication technologies.
