= South Atlantic Airways =

Spanish charter airline

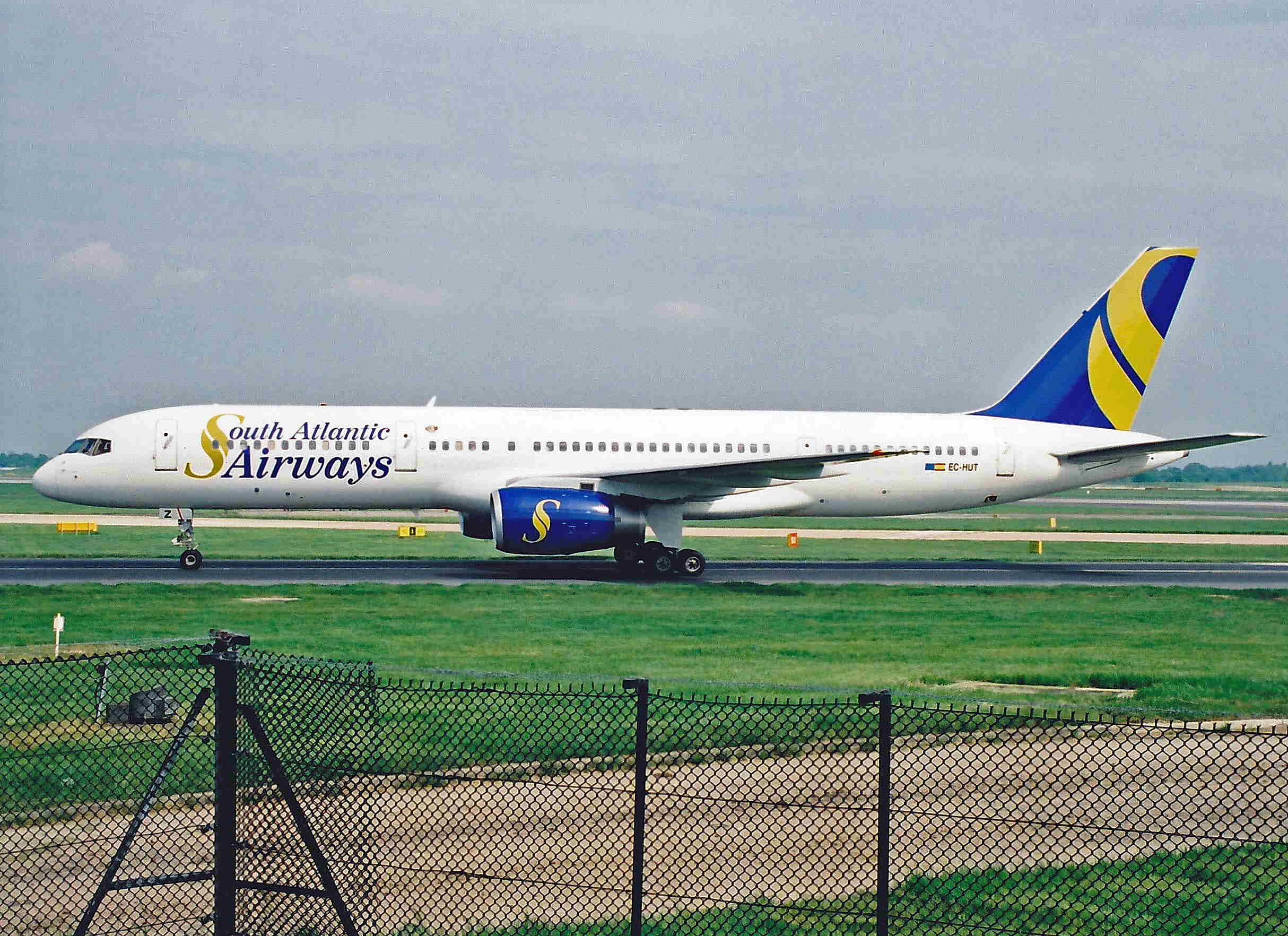
- South Atlantic Airways Boeing 757-236
IATA	ICAO	Call sign
-	HRC	-
- Commenced operations: 2000
- Ceased operations: 2001
- Operating bases: Tenerife South Airport
- Fleet size: Fleet below
- Headquarters: Santa Cruz de Tenerife, Spain
- Key people: Eduard Gusarov

South Atlantic Airways was an airline based in Santa Cruz de Tenerife, Canary Islands, Spain.

== History ==
South Atlantic Airways was founded in 2000 as a Spanish-Russian venture. The company leased a plane from Israeli airline Arkia and began operating charter flights in March 2001.

On 30 November 2001 South Atlantic Airways returned the leased plane to Arkia and ended all operations. The circumstances in which this airline operated and its activities were not clear and are rife with speculations.

== Code data ==
- ICAO Code: HRC (not current)

== Fleet ==
- 1 Boeing 757
