= HRC (gene) =

Protein-coding gene in the species Homo sapiens

Identifiers
- Aliases: HRC, histidine rich calcium binding protein
- External IDs: OMIM: 142705; GeneCards: HRC

Gene location (Human)
Chr.	Chromosome 19 (human)
Band	19q13.33	Start	49,151,198 bp
Band	19q13.33	End	49,155,396 bp
RNA expression pattern
Bgee	Human / Mouse (ortholog); Top expressed in: apex of heart; myocardium of left ventricle; right auricle of heart; gastrocnemius muscle; right ventricle; muscle of thigh; glutes; cardiac muscle tissue of right atrium; triceps brachii muscle; skeletal muscle tissue / n/a; More reference expression data
BioGPS	n/a
Gene ontology
Molecular function	ATPase binding; transmembrane transporter binding; protein binding; calcium ion binding
Cellular component	sarcoplasmic reticulum lumen; sarcoplasmic reticulum; Z discdkac; sarcoplasmic reticulum membrane; endoplasmic reticulum lumen
Biological process	muscle contraction; regulation of ryanodine-sensitive calcium-release channel activity; regulation of release of sequestered calcium ion into cytosol by sarcoplasmic reticulum; positive regulation of relaxation of cardiac muscle; regulation of heart rate; regulation of calcium ion transmembrane transport; positive regulation of heart rate; calcium ion homeostasis; regulation of peptidyl-serine phosphorylation; regulation of heart contraction; regulation of cardiac muscle contraction by regulation of the release of sequestered calcium ion; regulation of cytosolic calcium ion concentration; positive regulation of heart contraction; regulation of cell communication by electrical coupling involved in cardiac conduction; post-translational protein modification; negative regulation of cytosolic calcium ion concentration
Sources:Amigo / QuickGO
Orthologs
Databases	NCBI: entry; OMA: entry
Species	Human	Mouse
Entrez	3270	n/a
Ensembl	ENSG00000130528	n/a
UniProt	P23327	n/a
RefSeq (mRNA)	NM_002152	n/a
RefSeq (protein)	NP_002143	n/a
Location (UCSC)	Chr 19: 49.15 – 49.16 Mb	n/a
PubMed search		n/a
- Wikidata
View/Edit Human

Sarcoplasmic reticulum histidine-rich calcium-binding protein is a protein that in humans is encoded by the HRC gene.

== Function ==
Histidine-rich calcium-binding protein is a luminal sarcoplasmic reticulum protein of 165 kD, identified by its ability to bind low-density lipoprotein with high affinity.
