= Twin and earth =

Type of flat sheathed fixed mains electricity cable

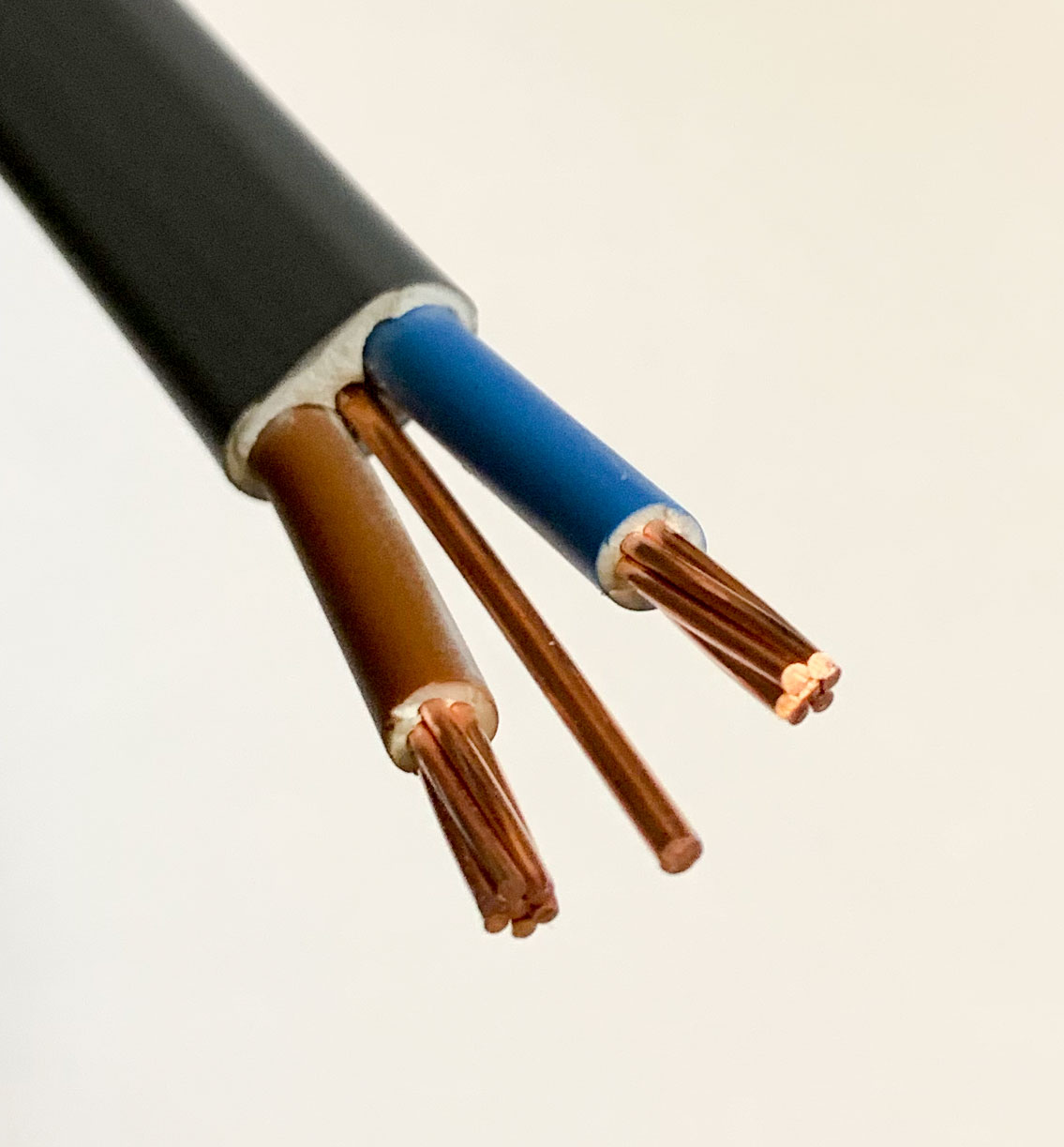
'Twin and Earth' electrical cable to British Standard 6004, with twin 6 mm^{2} conductors and uninsulated 2.5 mm^{2} earth continuity conductor

Twin and earth (often written "T&E" and sometimes "T and E") cable is a colloquial name in the UK, Australia, New Zealand and other countries for a type of flat sheathed fixed mains electricity cable, containing two insulated current-carrying conductors and an Earth connector. In Australia and New Zealand this type of cable is referred to as 'Flat TPS' (Thermoplastic-sheathed), as well as "Twin and Earth" or "Twin with Earth".

== Construction ==
These cables comprise two individually insulated current-carrying conductors and a Circuit Protective Conductor (CPC = PE = Earth). It is not intended to be used where it is subject to regular movement or sunlight, because the sheathing is affected by ultraviolet radiation.

== Uses ==
It is commonly used for fixed wiring in domestic and commercial premises.

== Limitations ==
Twin and Earth cable is not designed to withstand significant mechanical abuse. It should not be installed in areas where it could be subject to abrasion or blows without additional mechanical protection. It must be installed so that it is physically supported at regular intervals. It is not suitable for overhead catenary use.

Twin and Earth cable is normally made with PVC sheathing and insulation, which can have a long service life under appropriate conditions. However, UV light will cause it to fail, so Twin and Earth is not suitable for use outdoors.

It has a temperature rating of 70 °C, including the temperature rise from resistive heating in the cable.

PVC gives off hazardous smoke when burned. National standards for electrical wiring prohibit PVC cables in locations where this is a particular risk, such as fire escape routes.

An insidious risk can occur when PVC cable comes into contact with expanded polystyrene insulation, either in rigid panels or as loose beads. The effect is caused by migration of the plasticiser from the PVC, causing it to become brittle. The same problem has been reported with bitumen sealants.

Some Twin and Earth cable manufactured in the late 1960s and early 1970s had a deficiency in its manufacture which over time results in the production of a green conductive slime.

== Regional variations ==
=== United Kingdom ===
In the UK the CPC is uninsulated (bare) and of reduced diameter compared to the main cores. Green and yellow sleeving, which is sold separately, is required to be used to cover the exposed ends. There is an overall sheath of grey PVC (BS 6004), or white for low smoke compound (BS 7211), although prior to 2005 white sheathing was also available in PVC.

Core and sheathing colours may be throughout the thickness of the material, or only on the surface. The latter means that any damage such as accidental knife cuts are readily visible.

=== Republic of Ireland ===
In the Republic of Ireland the situation is different. From 2013, Irish wiring rules require a CPC with a cross-section equal to that of the main conductors and insulated in green and yellow inside the full length of the cable, from the new standard IS 201-4:2013. The older bare and reduced diameter CPC cables are no longer permitted for new wiring in the Republic of Ireland.

UK wiring regulations however do not at present (BS 7671:2018) recognise Twin and Earth or Flat TPS with a full sized and insulated (G/Y) earth conductor as a permitted cable type, which may be awkward for contractors who work cross-border.

Versions of flat cable are also available in smaller conductor sizes containing three current-carrying conductors in addition to the circuit protective (earth) conductor. These configurations are commonly used for applications such as switched light circuits, battery-backed emergency lighting which requires a switched and unswitched supply, extractor fans with a run-on timer which require a switched and unswitched supply, mains-powered interlinked smoke alarms, and central heating thermostats.

=== Australia and New Zealand ===
In Australia and New Zealand flat 'TPS' (Thermo-plastic sheathed) "Twin and Earth" cables manufactured prior to 1966 were permitted the use of an uninsulated CPC stranded core, requiring that the exposed ends of this conductor be sleeved with Green insulating tubing. (Before the advent of PVC, this tubing was varnished cambric.) After 1966 it was required that the CPC within TPS cables be insulated with Green insulation during manufacture, to the same standard as the current carrying conductors. Since 1980, the colour of this insulation has been required to be Green/Yellow.

In Australia and New Zealand, Single conductor and Twin conductor TPS cables also are available.

These are needed because, while AS/NZS Section 3.8.2. does allow "Colour identification by sleeving or other means", (so that, for example, the Neutral conductor in a "Twin and Earth" cable may be "re-purposed" as a "Switched Line" conductor), this practice has been discouraged by Australian "training" establishments. Hence, where a "Switch Loop" is required, a Twin conductor TPS cable is usually used.

"Three Conductor plus Earth" TPS cables also exist, having uses in multiway switching. However, an additional "Single TPS" is often used with a "Twin and Earth" TPS or a "Twin TPS" in multiway switching circuits.

The conductor in a "Single TPS" cable usually has Red insulation and the conductors in a "Twin TPS" cable usually have Red and White insulation - with the White insulated wire usually being used as a "Switched Line" conductor.

1 mm^{2} TPS cables have solid current carrying conductors.

1.5 mm^{2} to 2.5 mm^{2} TPS cables are available with both solid and stranded current carrying conductors. However, cables with solid conductors are now not usually used, since the cost of the stranded conductor cable is only slightly greater than that of the "solid conductor" cable and "stranded conductor" cables are much easier with which to work.

The available TPS cables greater than 2.5 mm^{2} all have stranded conductors.

The CPC conductor used is always stranded.

== Standard UK metric twin and earth cable sizes ==
1/1 mm^{2} and 1.5/1 mm^{2} have solid conductors and CPC

2.5/1.5mm² has a solid CPC and may have solid or stranded conductors

4/1.5 mm^{2} and 6/2.5 mm^{2} have stranded conductors and a solid CPC

10/4 mm^{2} and 16/6 mm^{2} have stranded conductors and CPC
