= Insulated Cable Engineers Association =

Formed in the United States in 1925, the Insulated Cables Engineers Association, Inc. (ICEA), is a not-for profit professional association. In conjunction with other organizations like NEMA and ANSI, it produces technical standards for the manufacture and use of power cable, data, and control cable. It was founded as the Insulated Power Cables Engineers Association, but changed names to reflect their full range of activities.
