= Slash rating =

The slash rating, under the United States National Electrical Code, is given to circuit interrupt hardware and specifies a maximum line-to-ground voltage rating in combination with a maximum line-to-line voltage rating. One common application would be for a three-phase electrical loads. For example a 120/240 V rating can disqualify a circuit breaker for use with a delta system load that would otherwise work with a wye system load.
