= Canadian Electrical Code =

Standard published by the Canadian Standards Association

The Canadian Electrical Code, officially CSA C22.x, informally CE Code, is a collection of standards published by the Canadian Standards Association pertaining to the installation and maintenance of electrical equipment in Canada.

The first edition of the Canadian Electrical Code was published in 1927. The current (26th) edition was published in March of 2024. Code revisions are currently scheduled on a three-year cycle. The Code is produced by a large body of volunteers from industry and various levels of government. The Code uses a prescriptive model, outlining in detail the wiring methods that are acceptable. In the current edition, the Code recognizes that other methods can be used to assure safe installations, but these methods must be acceptable to the authority enforcing the Code in a particular jurisdiction.

The Canadian Electrical Code serves as the basis for wiring regulations across Canada. Generally, legislation adopts the Code by reference, usually with a schedule of changes that amend the Code for local conditions. These amendments may be administrative in nature or may consist of technical content particular to the region. Since the Code is a copyrighted document produced by a private body, it may not be distributed without copyright permission from the Canadian Standards Association.

The Code is divided into sections, each section is labeled with an even number and a title. Sections 0, 2, 4, 6, 8, 10, 12, 14, 16, and 26 include rules that apply to installations in general; the remaining sections are supplementary and deal with installation methods in specific locations or situations. Some examples of general sections include: wiring methods, raceway conduit installation rules, grounding and bonding, protection and control, conductors, and definitions. Some examples of supplementary sections include: wet locations, hazardous locations, patient care areas, emergency systems, and temporary installations. When interpreting the requirements for a particular installation, rules found in supplementary sections of the Code amend or supersede the rules in general sections of the Code.

Starting from the CEC 2021 version, relevant definitions and requirements for renewable energy systems, energy storage systems and peripheral equipment have been added (Section 64). In this section, CEC defines and explains each important component, and provides relevant installation requirements and guidance.

The Canadian Electrical Code does not apply to vehicles, systems operated by an electrical or communications utility, railway systems, aircraft or ships; since these installations are already regulated by separate documents.

The Canadian Electrical Code is published in several parts: Part I is the safety standard for electrical installations. Part II is a collection of individual standards for the evaluation of electrical equipment or installations. (Part I requires that electrical products be approved to a Part II standard) Part III is the safety standard for power distribution and transmission circuits. Part IV is set of objective-based standards that may be used in certain industrial or institutional installations. Part VI establishes standards for the inspection of electrical installation in residential buildings.

Technical requirements of the Canadian Electrical Code are very similar to those of the U.S. National Electrical Code. Specific differences still exist and installations acceptable under one Code may not entirely comply with the other. Correlation of technical requirements between the two Codes is ongoing.

Several CE Code Part II electrical equipment standards have been harmonized with standards in the USA and Mexico through CANENA, The Council for the Harmonization of Electromechanical Standards of the Nations of the Americas (CANENA) is working to harmonize electrical codes in the western hemisphere.

== Objective based code ==
In response to industry demand, CSA has developed Part IV of the Canadian Electrical Code, consisting of two standards CSA C22.4 No. 1 "Objective-based industrial electrical code" and CSA C22.4 No. 2 "Objective-based industrial electrical code - Safety management system requirements". These standards are intended for use only by authorized industrial users and would not apply, for example, to residential construction. These standards do not prescribe specific solutions for every case but instead give guidance to the user on achievement of the safety objectives of IEC 60364. Since it is less prescriptive, the OBIEC allows industrial users to use new technology not yet represented in the CE Code Part II. Use of this OBIEC is restricted to industrial and institutional users who have a safety management program in place and the engineering resources to implement the regulations. It is intended that users of the OBIEC will maintain safety while using methods that will reduce the installation cost of large industrial plants, for example, in the petrochemical business.

== See also ==
- Electrical code
