= Central Electricity Authority Regulations =

Laws regulating electricity supply in India

CEAR namely Central Electricity Authority (Measures relating to Safety and Electric Supply) Regulations, 2010 are regulations framed by Central Electricity Authority of India under the Indian Electricity Act, 2003, to regulate measures relating to safety and electric supply in India.

== History ==
CEAR came into effect on the 20th of September 2010, in place of The Indian Electricity Rules, 1956.

The Electricity Act, 2003, was formulated combining the Indian Electricity Act 1910 and Indian Electricity (supply) Act 1948.

== Earthing provisions and safety ==
Under CEAR, rule 41, there is specific provision of earthing neutral wire of a 3-phase, 4-wire system and the additional third wire of a 2- phase, 3-wire system. Earthing is to be done with two separate connections. Grounding system also to have minimum two or more earth pits (electrode) such that proper grounding takes place. As per the rule 42, installation with load above 5 kW exceeding 250 V shall have suitable Earth leakage protective device to isolate the load in case of earth fault or leakage.

Neutral and earth run separately on overhead line/cables. Separate conductor for overhead lines and armouring of cables are used for earth connection. Additional earth electrodes/pits are installed at user ends for proper earth.

All metal casing or metallic coverings of electric supply line or apparatus to be connected with earth and all such earthling points shall be so joined to make good mechanical and electrical connection in complete system.

=== Earthing in mines ===
Earthing in an underground mine shall be carried out by connection to an earthing system at the surface of the mine as per rule 99.

As per rule 100, protective equipment is to be placed in the mines for automatic disconnection of supply when there is earth fault exceeding 750 milliampere in 250 V to 1000 Volt installations. For open cast mine the limit is 50 ampere in installations of voltage exceeding 1100 V and up to 11 kV. The earth leakage current is to be restricted by placing suitable neutral grounding resistance (NGR) in all the distribution transformers.

== Salient features ==
Chapters and regulations there in:-

- Chapter - I Definitions

1 Short title and Commencement

2 Definitions

- Chapter - II

3 Designating person(s) to operate and carry out the work on electrical lines and apparatus

4 Inspection of designated officers and other safety measures

5 Electrical Safety Officer

6 Safety measures for operation and maintenance of electric plants

7 Safety measures for operation and maintenance of transmission, distribution systems

8 Keeping of records and inspection there of

9 Deposit of maps

10 Deposit of printed copies

11 Plan for area of supply to be made and kept open for inspection

- Chapter - III General safety requirements

12 General safety requirements, pertaining to construction, installation, protection, operation and maintenance of electric supply lines apparatus

13 Service lines and apparatus on consumer’s premises

14 Switchgear on consumer’s premises

15 Identification of earthed and earthed neutral conductors and position of switches and switchgear therein

16 Earthed terminal on consumer’s premises

17 Accessibility of bare conductors

18 Danger Notices

19 Handling of electric supply lines and apparatus

20 Supply to vehicles and cranes

21 Cables for portable or transportable apparatus

22 Cables protected by bituminous materials

23 Street boxes

24 Distinction of different circuits

25 Distinction of the installations having more than one feed

26 Accidental charging

27 Provisions applicable to protective equipment

28 Display of instructions for resuscitation of persons suffering from electric shock

29 Precautions to be adopted by consumers, owners, occupiers, electrical contractors, electrical workmen and suppliers

30 Periodical inspection and-testing of Installations

31 Testing of consumer's installation

32 Installation and testing of generating units

Chapter - IV General conditions relating to supply and use of electricity

33 Precautions against leakage before connection

34 Leakage on consumer's premises

35 Supply and use of electricity

36 Provisions for supply and use of electricity in multi-storied building more than 15 meters in height

37 Conditions applicable to installations of voltage exceeding 250 Volts

38 Appeal to Electrical Inspector in regard to defects

39 Precautions against failure of supply and notice of failures

- Chapter - V Safety Provisions for Electrical Installations and apparatus of voltage not exceeding 650 volts

40 Test for resistance of insulation

41 Connection with earth

42 Earth leakage protective device

Chapter - VI Safety Provisions for Electrical Installations and apparatus of voltage exceeding 650 volts

43 Approval by Electrical Inspector

44 Use of electricity at voltage exceeding 650 Volts

45 Inter-locks and protection for use of electricity at voltage exceeding 650 Volts

46 Testing, Operation and Maintenance

47 Precautions to be taken against excess leakage in case of metal sheathed electric supply lines

48 Connection with earth for apparatus exceeding 650 V

49 General conditions as to transformation and control of electricity

50 Pole type sub-stations

51 Condensers

52 Supply to luminous tube sign installations of voltage exceeding 650 Volts but not exceeding 33 kV

53 Supply to electrode boilers of voltage exceeding 650 Volt but not exceeding 33 kV

54 Supply to X-ray and high frequency installations

- Chapter - VII Safety requirements for overhead lines, underground cables and generating stations

55 Material and strength

56 Joints

57 Maximum stresses and factors of safety

58 Clearance above ground of the lowest conductor of overhead lines

59 Clearance between conductors and trolley wires

60 Clearance from buildings of lines of voltage and service lines not exceeding 650 Volts

61 Clearances from buildings of lines of voltage exceeding 650 V

62 Conductors at different voltages on same supports

63 Erection or alteration of buildings, structures, flood banks and elevation of roads

64 Transporting and storing of material near overhead lines

65 General clearances

66 Routes proximity to aerodromes

67 Maximum interval between supports

68 Conditions to apply where telecommunication lines and power lines are carried on same supports

69 Lines crossing or approaching each other and lines crossing street and road

70 Guarding

71 Service lines from overhead lines

72 Earthing

73 Safety and protective devices

74 Protection against lightning

75 Unused overhead lines

76 Laying of cables

77 Protection against electromagnetic interference

- Chapter - VIII Safety requirements for Electric Traction

78 Application of chapter

79 Voltage of supply to vehicle

80 Insulation of lines

81 Insulation of returns

82 Proximity to metallic pipes

83 Difference of potential on return

84 Leakage on conduit system

85 Leakage on system other than conduit system

86 Passengers not to have access to electric circuit

87 Isolation of sections

88 Minimum size and strength of trolley wire

89 Height of trolley wire and length of span

90 Earthing of guard wires

91 Proximity to magnetic observatories and laboratories

92 Records

- Chapter - IX Safety requirements for mines and oil fields

93 Application of chapter

94 Responsibility for observance

95 Notices

== See also ==
- Electrical code
