= National Electrical Safety Code =

United States standard

The National Electrical Safety Code (NESC) or ANSI Standard C2 is a United States standard of the safe installation, operation, and maintenance of electric power and communication utility systems including power substations, power and communication overhead lines, and power and communication underground lines. It is published by the Institute of Electrical and Electronics Engineers (IEEE). "National Electrical Safety Code" and "NESC" are registered trademarks of the IEEE.

The NESC should not be confused with the National Electrical Code (NEC), which is published by the National Fire Protection Association (NFPA) and intended to be used for residential, commercial, and industrial building wiring.

== Adoption ==
The NESC is written as a voluntary standard. It is typically adopted as law by individual states or other governmental authorities. To determine the legal status of the NESC, the state public service commission, public utility commission, or other governmental authority should be contacted. Most U.S. states adopt the NESC in some form or fashion. The state of California is an exception and writes its own utility codes, titled General Order 95 (GO95) for overhead lines and General Order 128 (GO128) for underground lines.

== Publication ==
The NESC is written by various sub committees. The organizations represented, subcommittees, and committee members are listed in the front of the code book. The NESC contains the procedure and time schedule for revising the NESC, which are described in the back of the code book. The NESC has an interpretation committee that issues formal interpretations. The process for obtaining a formal interpretation is outlined in the front of the code book. The NESC is currently published on a 5-year cycle. Urgent safety matters that require a change in between code editions are handled through a Tentative Interim Amendment (TIA) process. Original work on the NESC began in 1913.

== Structure ==
The NESC is structured into parts, sections, and rules. There are general sections at the beginning of the book covering the introduction, definitions, references, and grounding. Following the general section are four main parts including: substations rules (Part 1), overhead line rules (Part 2), underground line rules (Part 3), and work rules (Part 4).

== Handbooks and other resources ==
- Marne, David J. McGraw Hill's National Electrical Safety Code (NESC) 2023 Handbook. McGraw-Hill Education.
- The 2023 NESC Handbook represents a next-generation tool for the professional who needs to understand the NESC. The handbook was developed for use at many levels in the electric and communication industries, including those involved in system design, construction, maintenance, inspection, standards development and worker training. This step-by-step guide explains how to apply and meet the NESC rules for electrical supply stations and equipment, as well as overhead and underground electric supply and communications lines.
- The 2023 NESC Course Program is a series of online courses that take an in-depth look at the rules, regulations, and changes made in the 2023 NESC Edition. Taught by industry leaders who helped write the standard, these courses provide essential training for safeguarding power utility facilities and the people around them. Available through the IEEE Xplore digital library and the IEEE Learning Network.

== See also ==
- Institute of Electrical and Electronics Engineers
- IEEE Standards Association
