= National Electrical Code =

Electrical wiring standard in the United States

The National Electrical Code, 2008 edition

The National Electrical Code (NEC), or NFPA 70, is a regionally adoptable standard for the safe installation of electrical wiring and equipment in the United States. It is part of the National Fire Code series published by the National Fire Protection Association (NFPA), a private trade association. Despite the use of the term "national," it is not a federal law. It is typically adopted by states and municipalities in an effort to standardize their enforcement of safe electrical practices. In some cases, the NEC is amended, altered and may even be rejected in lieu of regional regulations as voted on by local governing bodies.

The "authority having jurisdiction" inspects for compliance with the standards.

The NEC should not be confused with the National Electrical Safety Code (NESC), published by the Institute of Electrical and Electronics Engineers (IEEE). The NESC is used for electric power and communication utility systems including overhead lines, underground lines, and power substations.

== Background ==
The NEC is developed by NFPA's Committee on the National Electrical Code, which consists of twenty code-making panels and a technical correlating committee. Work on the NEC is sponsored by the National Fire Protection Association. The NEC is approved as an American national standard by the American National Standards Institute (ANSI). It is formally identified as ANSI/NFPA 70.

First published in 1897, the NEC is updated and published every three years, with the 2026 edition being the most current. Most states adopt the most recent edition within a few of years of its publication. As with any "uniform" code, jurisdictions may regularly omit or modify some sections, or add their own requirements (sometimes based upon earlier versions of the NEC, or locally accepted practices). However, no court has faulted anyone for using the latest version of the NEC, even when the local code was not updated.

In the United States, anyone, including the city issuing building permits, may face a civil liability lawsuit for negligently creating a situation that results in loss of life or property. Those who fail to adhere to well known best practices for safety have been held negligent. This liability and the desire to protect residents has motivated cities to adopt and enforce building codes that specify standards and practices for electrical systems (as well as other departments such as water and fuel-gas systems). That creates a system whereby a city can best avoid lawsuits by adopting a single standard set of building code laws. This has led to the NEC becoming the de facto standard set of electrical requirements. A licensed electrician will have spent years of apprenticeship studying and practicing the NEC requirements prior to obtaining their license.

The Deactivation and Decommissioning (D&D) customized extension of the electrical code standard defined by National Electrical Code was developed since current engineering standards and code requirements do not adequately address the unique situations arising during D&D activities at U.S. Department of Energy (DOE) facilities. The additional guidance is needed to clarify the current electrical code for these situations. The guidance document provides guidance on how to interpret selected articles of NFPA 70, “National Electrical Code” (NEC), in particular certain articles within Article 590, “Temporary Power,” for D&D electrical activities at DOE sites.

The NEC also contains information about the official definition of HAZLOC and the related standards given by the Occupational Safety and Health Administration and dealing with hazardous locations such as explosive atmospheres.

=== Public access ===
The NEC is available as a bound book containing approximately 1000 pages. It has been available in electronic form since the 1993 edition. Although the code is updated every three years, some jurisdictions do not immediately adopt the new edition.

In the United States, statutory law cannot be copyrighted and is freely accessible and copyable by anyone. When a standards organization develops a new coding model and it is not yet accepted by any jurisdiction as law, it is still the private property of the standards organization and the reader may be restricted from downloading or printing the text for offline viewing. For that privilege, the coding model must still be purchased as either printed media or electronic format (e.g. PDF.) Once the coding model has been accepted as law, it loses copyright protection and may be freely obtained at no cost.

The NFPA accommodates this access only with an online system, requiring account registration to view a watermarked copy, which cannot be downloaded or printed.

== Structure ==
The NEC is composed of an introduction, nine chapters, annexes A through J, and the index. The introduction sets forth the purpose, scope, enforcement, and rules or information that are general in nature. The first four chapters cover definitions and rules for installations (voltages, connections, markings, etc.), circuits and circuit protection, methods and materials for wiring (wiring devices, conductors, cables, etc.), and general-purpose equipment (cords, receptacles, switches, heaters, etc.). The next three chapters deal with special occupancies (high risk to multiple persons), special equipment (signs, machinery, etc.) and special conditions (emergency systems, alarms, etc.). Chapter 8 is specific to additional requirements for communications systems (telephone, radio/TV, etc.) and chapter 9 is composed of tables regarding conductor, cable and conduit properties, among other things. Annexes A-J relate to referenced standards, calculations, examples, additional tables for proper implementation of various code articles (for example, how many wires fit in a conduit) and a model adoption ordinance.

The introduction and the first 8 chapters contain numbered parts, articles, sections (or lists or tables), item, specifics, inclusions/exclusions, precise inclusion/exclusion, italicized exceptions, and explanatory material – explanations that are not part of the rules. Articles are coded with numerals and letters, as ###.###(A)(#)(a). For example, 805.133(A)(1)(a)(1), would be read as "article 805, section 133, item (A) Separation from Other Conductors, specific (1) In Raceways, cable Trays, Boxes,... inclusion (a) Other Circuits, precise inclusion (1) Class 2 and Class 3...." and would be found in Chapter 8, Part IV Installation Methods Within Buildings. For internal references, some lengthy articles are further broken into "parts" with Roman-numerals (parts I, II, III, etc.).

Each code article is numbered based on the chapter it is in. Those wiring methods acceptable by the NEC are found in chapter 3, thus all approved wiring method code articles are in the 300s. Efforts have been underway for some time to make the code easier to use. Some of those efforts include using the same extension for both code articles and for the support of wiring methods.

The NFPA also publishes a 1,497-page NEC Handbook (for each new NEC edition) that contains the entire code, plus additional illustrations and explanations, and helpful cross-references within the code and to earlier versions of the code. The explanations are only for reference and are not enforceable.

Underwriters Laboratories, one of many of the testing laboratories recognized by OSHA.

Many NEC requirements refer to "listed" or "labeled" devices and appliances, and this means that the item has been designed, manufactured, tested or inspected, and marked in accordance with requirements of the listing agency. To be listed, the device must meet testing and other requirements set by a listing agency such as Underwriters Laboratories (UL), SGS North America, Intertek (Formerly ETL), Canadian Standards Association (CSA), or FM Approvals (FM). These are examples of "national recognized testing laboratories" (NRTL) approved by the U.S. Department of Labor's Occupational Safety and Health Administration (OSHA) under the requirements of 29 CFR 1910.7. Only a listed device can carry the listing brand (or "mark") of the listing agency. Upon payment of an investigation fee to determine suitability, an investigation is started. To be labeled as fit for a particular purpose (for example "wet locations", "domestic range") a device must be tested for that specific use by the listing agency and then the appropriate label applied to the device. A fee is paid to the listing agency for each item so labeled, that is, for each label. Most NRTLs will also require that the manufacturer's facilities and processes be inspected as evidence that a product will be manufactured reliably and with the same qualities as the sample or samples submitted for evaluation. An NRTL may also conduct periodic sample testing of off-the-shelf products to confirm that safety design criteria are being upheld during production. Because of the reputation of these listing agencies, the "authority having jurisdiction" ( or "AHJ" – as they are commonly known) usually will quickly accept any device, appliance, or piece of equipment having such a label, provided that an end user or installer uses the product in accordance with manufacturer's instructions and the limitations of the listing standard. However, an AHJ, under the National Electrical Code provisions, has the authority to deny approval for even listed and labeled products. Likewise, an AHJ may make a written approval of an installation or product that does not meet either NEC or listing requirements, although this is normally done only after an appropriate review of the specific conditions of a particular case or location.

== Requirements ==
Article 210 addresses "branch circuits" (as opposed to service or feeder circuits) and receptacles and fixtures on branch circuits. Electrical Construction and Maintenance Magazine, Branch Circuits, Part 2. There are requirements for the minimum number of branches, and placement of receptacles, according to the location and purpose of the receptacle outlet. Ten important items in Article 210 have been summarized in a codebook.

Feeder and branch circuit wiring systems are designed primarily for copper conductors. Aluminum wiring is listed by Underwriters Laboratories for interior wiring applications and became increasingly used around 1966 due to its lower cost. Prior to 1972, however, the aluminum wire used was manufactured to conform to the 1350 series aluminum alloy, but this alloy was eventually deemed unsuitable for branch circuits due to galvanic corrosion where the copper and aluminum touched, resulting in poor contact and resistance to current flow, connector overheating problems, and potential fire risk. Today, a new aluminum wire (AA-8000) has been approved for branch circuits that does not cause corrosion where it contacts copper, but it is not readily available and is not manufactured below size #8 AWG. Hence, copper wire is used almost exclusively in branch circuitry.

A ground fault circuit interrupter (GFCI) is required for all receptacles in wet locations defined in the Code. The NEC also has rules about how many circuits and receptacles should be placed in a given residential dwelling, and how far apart they can be in a given type of room, based upon the typical cord length of small appliances.

Polarized, grounding, 120 Volt receptacle

During World War II it was permitted for the cases of some specially listed fix-wired appliances, including kitchen stoves (ranges; ovens), cook tops, and clothes dryers, to be grounded through their neutral conductor as a measure to conserve copper. This practice was removed in the 1996 edition, but existing installations (called "old work") may still allow this to remain in place.

As of 1962, the NEC required that new 120 volt household receptacle outlets, for general purpose use, be both grounded and polarized. NEMA connectors implement these requirements.

The NEC also permits grounding-type receptacles in non-grounded wiring protected by a GFCI; this only applies when old non-grounded receptacles are replaced with grounded receptacles, and the new receptacles must be marked with 'No equipment ground' and 'GFCI Protected' .

240 V receptacle faces

The 1999 Code required that new 120/240 volt receptacles, such as those for electric ranges and dryers, be grounded also, which necessitates a fourth slot in their faces. Changes in standards often create problems for new work in old buildings.

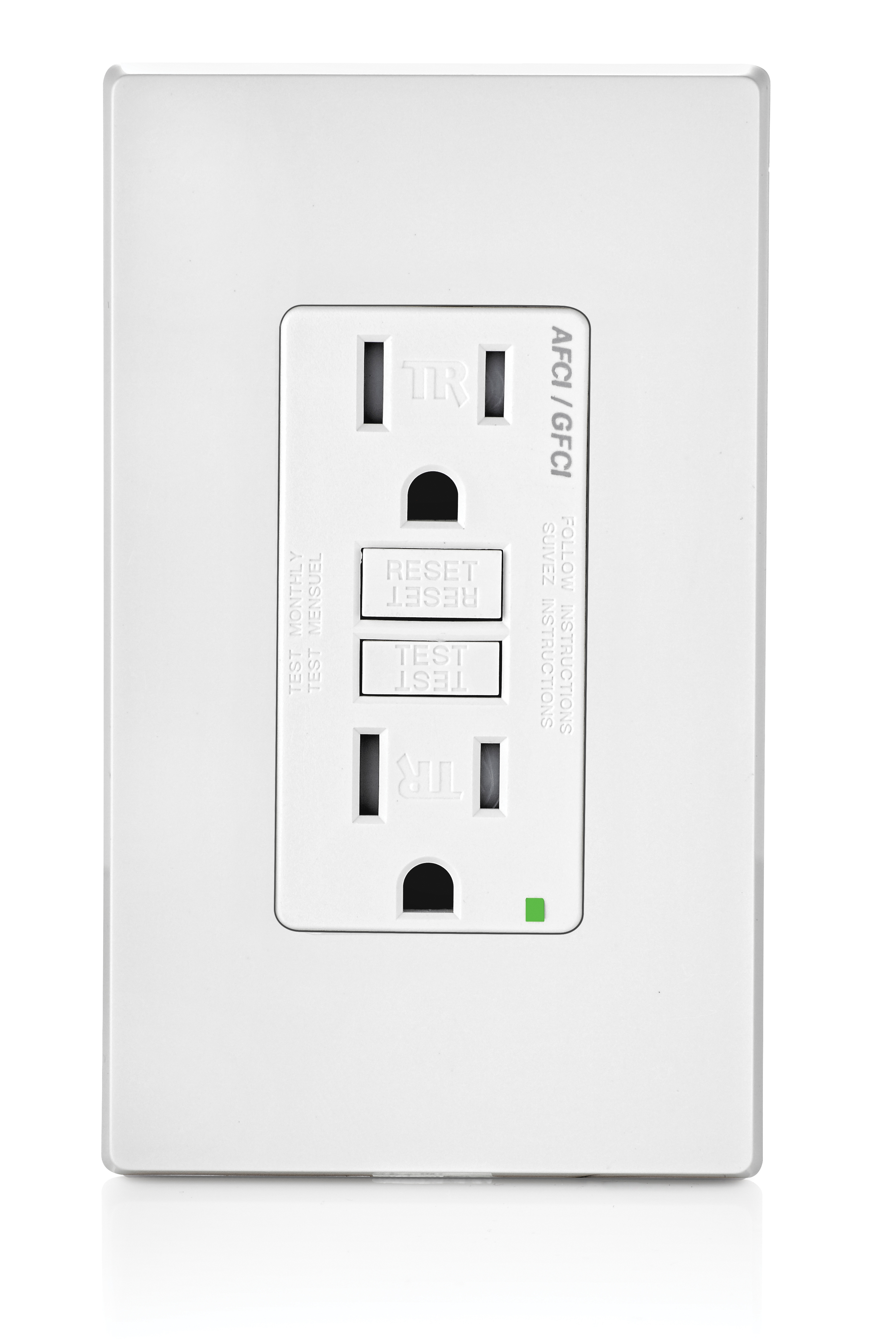
A 120 volt combination AFCI/GFCI receptacle

Unlike circuit breakers and fuses, which only open the circuit when the current exceeds a fixed value for a fixed time, a GFCI device will interrupt electrical service when more than 4 to 6 milliamperes of current in either conductor leaks to ground. A GFCI detects an imbalance between the current in the "hot" side and the current in the "neutral" side. One GFCI receptacle can serve as protection for several downstream conventional receptacles. GFCI devices come in many configurations including circuit-breakers, portable devices and receptacles.

Another safety device introduced with the 1999 code is the arc-fault circuit interrupter (AFCI). This device detects arcs from hot to neutral that can develop when insulation between wires becomes frayed or damaged. While arcs from hot to neutral would not trip a GFCI device since current is still balanced, circuitry in an AFCI device detects those arcs and will shut down a circuit. AFCI devices generally replace the circuit breaker in the circuit. As of the 1999 National Electrical Code, AFCI protection is required in new construction on all 15- and 20-amp, 125-volt circuits to bedrooms.

=== Conduit and cable protection ===
The NEC requires that conductors of a circuit must be inside a raceway, cable, trench, cord, or cable tray. Additional protection such as NM cable inside raceway is needed if the installation method is subject to physical damage as determined by the authority having jurisdiction.

The NEC sets three general requirements that PVC conduit must meet to ensure safe electrical installations. These requirements include:

1.Compliance with UL Standards: PVC conduit used in electrical installations must comply with the UL (Underwriters Laboratories) standards specifically designed for PVC conduit. This ensures that the conduit meets the necessary safety and performance criteria.

2.Environmental Suitability: PVC conduit must be suitable for the environment in which it will be installed. Different types of PVC conduit are available for indoor, outdoor, wet, or corrosive environments. Choosing the appropriate type ensures the longevity and reliability of the conduit system.

3.Marking and Identification: PVC conduit must bear proper markings for identification, including the manufacturer’s name or trademark, conduit size, and applicable electrical standard. These markings help in identifying the conduit and verifying its compliance with the required standards.

=== Temperature rating ===
The temperature rating of a wire or cable is generally the maximum safe ambient temperature that the wire can carry full-load power without the cable insulation melting, oxidizing, or self-igniting. A full-load wire does heat up slightly due to the metallic resistance of the wire, but this wire heating is factored into the cable's temperature rating. (NEC 310.10)

The NEC specifies acceptable numbers of conductors in crowded areas such as inside conduit, referred to as the fill rating. If the accepted fill rating is exceeded, then all the cables in the conduit are derated, lowering their acceptable maximum ambient operating temperature. Derating is necessary because multiple conductors carrying full-load power generate heat that may exceed the normal insulation temperature rating. (NEC 310.16)

The NEC also specifies adjustments of the ampacity for wires in circular raceways exposed to sunlight on rooftops, due to the heating effects of solar radiation. Electrical Construction and Maintenance Magazine, Conductors for General Use, Chapter 3 Articles in NEC, starting with Article 342 This section is expected to be modified to include cables in future editions.

In certain situations, temperature rating can be higher than normal, such as for knob-and-tube wiring where two or more load-carrying wires are never likely to be in close proximity. A knob-and-tube installation uses wires suspended in air. This gives them a greater heat dissipation rating than standard three-wire NM-2 cable, which includes two tightly bundled load and return wires.

== Copyright Status ==
NEC, like many NFPA standards, relies on sales of its copyrighted standards to fund its development. In 2016, the group PUBLIC.RESOURCE.ORG, INC published copies of the code online free of cost, arguing that as a standard adopted as law, it should be publicly available. The case challenges the nature of funding sources for development of the standards, which are often adopted as law, but created without taxpayer dollars. NFPA in response has pointed to its making a free version of its standards available online, albeit in a less convenient forum than the standard that is available for purchase.

== See also ==
- Electrical code
- IEEE C2
- Slash rating
- Central Electricity Authority Regulations
