= Companies listed on the New York Stock Exchange (H) =

== H ==
| Stock name | Symbol | Country of origin |
|---|---|---|
| H&R Block | HRB | US |
| Haemonetics | HAE | US |
| Hafnia Limited | HAFN | US |
| Hagerty | HGTY | US |
| Halliburton | HAL | US |
| Hanover Insurance | THG | US |
| Harley-Davidson | HOG | US |
| Harmony Gold | HMY | South Africa |
| Harte Hanks | HHS | US |
| The Hartford | HIG | US |
| Havertys | HVT | US |
| Hawaiian Electric Industries | HE | US |
| H.B. Fuller | FUL | US |
| HCA Healthcare | HCA | US |
| Warrior Met Coal | HCC | US |
| HCI Group | HCI | US |
| Healthpeak Properties | DOC | US |
| HDFC Bank | HDB | India |
| Healthcare Realty Trust | HR | US |
| Healthcare Trust of America | HTA | US |
| Hecla Mining | HL | US |
| HEICO | HEI | US |
| Helix Energy Solutions Group | HLX | US |
| Helmerich & Payne | HP | US |
| Herbalife | HLF | Cayman Islands |
| Heritage Insurance Holdings | HRTG | US |
| The Hershey Company | HSY | US |
| The Hertz Corporation | HTZ | US |
| HP Inc. | HPQ | US |
| Hexcel | HXL | US |
| HF Sinclair | DINO | US |
| Higher One Holdings, Inc. | ONE | US |
| Highwoods Properties | HIW | US |
| Hill International | HIL | US |
| Hilltop Holdings | HTH | US |
| Hilton Worldwide | HLT | US |
| Hippo | HIPO | US |
| HNI Corporation | HNI | US |
| The Home Depot | HD | US |
| Honda | HMC | Japan |
| Honeywell | HON | US |
| Honeywell Aerospace | HONA | US |
| Horace Mann Educators Corporation | HMN | US |
| Hormel | HRL | US |
| Hornbeck Offshore Services | HOS | US |
| Host Hotels & Resorts | HST | US |
| Hovnanian Enterprises | HOV | US |
| HSBC | HSBC | United Kingdom |
| Huaneng Power International | HNP | China |
| Hudbay | HBM | Canada |
| Hudson Pacific Properties | HPP | US |
| Humana | HUM | US |
| Huntington Ingalls Industries | HII | US |
| Huntsman Corporation | HUN | US |
| Hyatt | H | US |
| Hyperdynamics | HDYNQ | US |
| Hyster-Yale Materials Handling | HY | US |
