= High resistance connection =

Electrical hazard

A high-resistance connection (HRC) is a hazard that results from loose or poor connections in traditional electrical accessories and switchgear which can cause heat to develop, capable of starting a fire.

Glowing connections occur when relatively high current exists in a relatively large resistance object. Heat comes from power dissipation. This energy, when dissipated in a small junction area, can generate temperatures above 1000 °C (1800 °F) and can ignite most flammable materials.

An example extract from the National Union of Teachers (NUT) Fire Safety Brief:

- Electrical equipment should be regularly maintained by competent people. Machines should not be allowed to overheat. Care should be taken not to cover machines while they are switched on as this is particularly likely to cause overheating. Trailing cables should be regularly checked for damage. Loose or poor connections in traditional electrical accessories and switchgear can cause heat to develop capable of starting a fire. This problem is known as High Resistance Connection (HRC) and safety devices such as fuses and Residual Current Devices (RCDs) are unable to disconnect the electrical supply because they cannot detect a HRC. Consideration should be given to the installation of a preventative system designed to stop electrical connections and accessories from reaching a temperature which would result in a fire. Such a device operates by effectively opening a switch at a pre-set temperature to prevent ignition, smoke or burning odour.

== Causes ==
Bad wiring junctions can occur in equipment, cords, or in-situ wiring and especially in a defective switch, socket, plug, wiring connection and even at the circuit breaker or fuse panels. Terminal screws loosened by vibration, improper tightening or other causes offer increased resistance to the current, with consequent heating and potential thermal creep, which will cause the termination to loosen further and exacerbate the heating effect. In North America, high resistance junctions are sometimes observed at the terminations of aluminum wire circuits, where oxidation has caused increased resistance, resulting in thermal creep. No technology located in a circuit breaker or fuse panel could detect a high-resistance wiring fault as no measurable characteristic exists that differentiates a glow fault from normal branch circuit operation. Power fault circuit interrupters (PFCI) located in receptacles are designed to prevent fires caused by glowing connections in wiring or panels. From the receptacle a PFCI can detect the voltage drop when high current exists in a high resistance junction. In a properly designed and maintained circuit, substantial voltage drops should never occur. Proper wire terminations inside equipment, such as appliances, and cords prevent high-resistance connections that could lead to fires.

== Detection ==
Thermal monitoring of the connection and providing an HRC device close to the probable location where a fault may develop is key to providing early warning or isolation to reduce the risk of fire.

Safety devices such as fuses and residual-current devices (RCDs) are unable to detect thermal rise and disconnect the electrical supply because they cannot sense a HRC. A safety device to prevent HRCs operates by effectively monitoring for the abnormal thermal rise and will prevent ignition, smoke or burning odour of the electrical accessory or electrical installation.
