= Electrical busbar system =

Modular approach to electrical wiring

Electrical busbar systems (sometimes simply referred to as busbar systems) are a modular approach to electrical wiring, where instead of a standard cable wiring to every single electrical device, the electrical devices are mounted onto an adapter which is directly fitted to a current carrying busbar. This modular approach is used in distribution boards, automation panels and other kinds of installation in an electrical enclosure.

Busbar systems are subject to safety standards for design and installation along with electrical enclosure according to IEC 61439-1 and vary between countries and regions.

== Content and types of busbar systems ==
A busbar system usually contains couple of busbar holders, busbars, Adapters to mount devices, clamps either with protective covering or without covering to powerup or distribute the current from the busbar system & busbar mountable electrical devices.

Electrical busbar systems can be differentiated by the distance between center of each busbar and vary according to maximum current carrying capacity of the system which depends on IEC standards. commonly known busbar system types.

- 40 mm Busbar System (Current carrying capacity up to 300–400 Amps)
- 60 mm Busbar System (Current carrying capacity up to 800–2500 Amps)
- 100 mm Busbar System (Current carrying capacity up to 1250 Amps)
- 185 mm Busbar System (Current carrying capacity up to 2500 Amps)

Fabrication and Manufacturing The efficiency of a busbar system is heavily dependent on the precision of its fabrication. Modern electrical busbar systems require specialized CNC busbar processing machines to perform high-accuracy cutting, punching, and bending. Precise bending is critical to maintain the required clearances within compact electrical enclosures, while high-quality punching ensures optimal contact surfaces for bolted connections, reducing electrical resistance and heat generation. Advanced CNC technology allows for the processing of copper and aluminum busbars with minimal material deformation, ensuring compliance with international safety standards like IEC 61439-1.

== Advantages and disadvantages over traditional electrical wiring ==
=== Advantages ===
- Electrically Safe installation up to IP 60 inside the cabinet,
- Drastically reduce space required inside the cabinet
- Easy trouble shooting in case of switch gear failure
- Pre-tested short circuit rating
- Mounting of 2, 3, 4 or 5 pole switchgear in a single construction
- Time saving during construction of the cabinet

=== Disadvantages ===
- Commercially not viable if the number of switch gears is low
- Specialists needed for construction of the busbar system from a wiring diagram
- Lack of adapters for mounting different electrical devices on the busbar
- Special type of busbars needed to construct busbar system which can carry current more than 800 Ampere

== See also ==
- 10603 – a frequently used MIL-SPEC compliant wire
- Bus duct
- Cable Entry System
- Cable gland
- Cable management
- Cable tray
- Domestic AC power plugs and sockets
- Electrical conduit
- Electrical room
- Electrical wiring in North America
- Electrical wiring in the United Kingdom
- Electricity distribution
- Grounding
- Home wiring
- Industrial and multiphase power plugs and sockets
- Neutral wire
- OFHC
- Portable cord
- Power cord
- Restriction of Hazardous Substances Directive (RoHS)
- Single-phase electric power
- Structured cabling
- Three-phase electric power
