= Electrical wiring =

Electrical installation of cabling

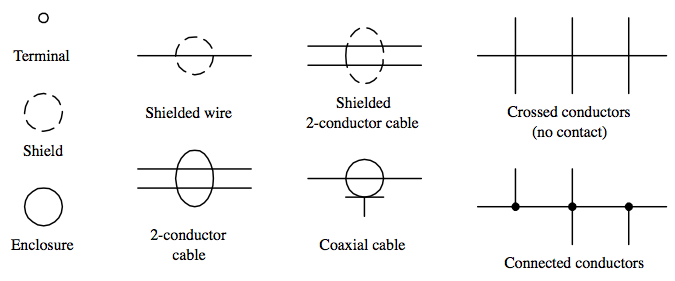
Electrical symbols for wiring

Electrical wiring is an electrical installation of cabling and associated devices such as switches, distribution boards, receptacles, outlets, and light fittings in a structure.

Wiring is subject to safety standards for design and installation. Allowable wire and cable types and sizes are specified according to the circuit operating voltage and electric current capability, with further restrictions on the environmental conditions, such as ambient temperature range, moisture levels, and exposure to sunlight and chemicals.

Associated circuit protection, control, and distribution devices within a building's wiring system are subject to voltage, current, and functional specifications. Wiring safety codes (including wiring colours) vary by locality, country, or region. The International Electrotechnical Commission (IEC) is attempting to harmonise wiring standards among member countries, but significant variations in design and installation requirements still exist.

== Wiring methods ==
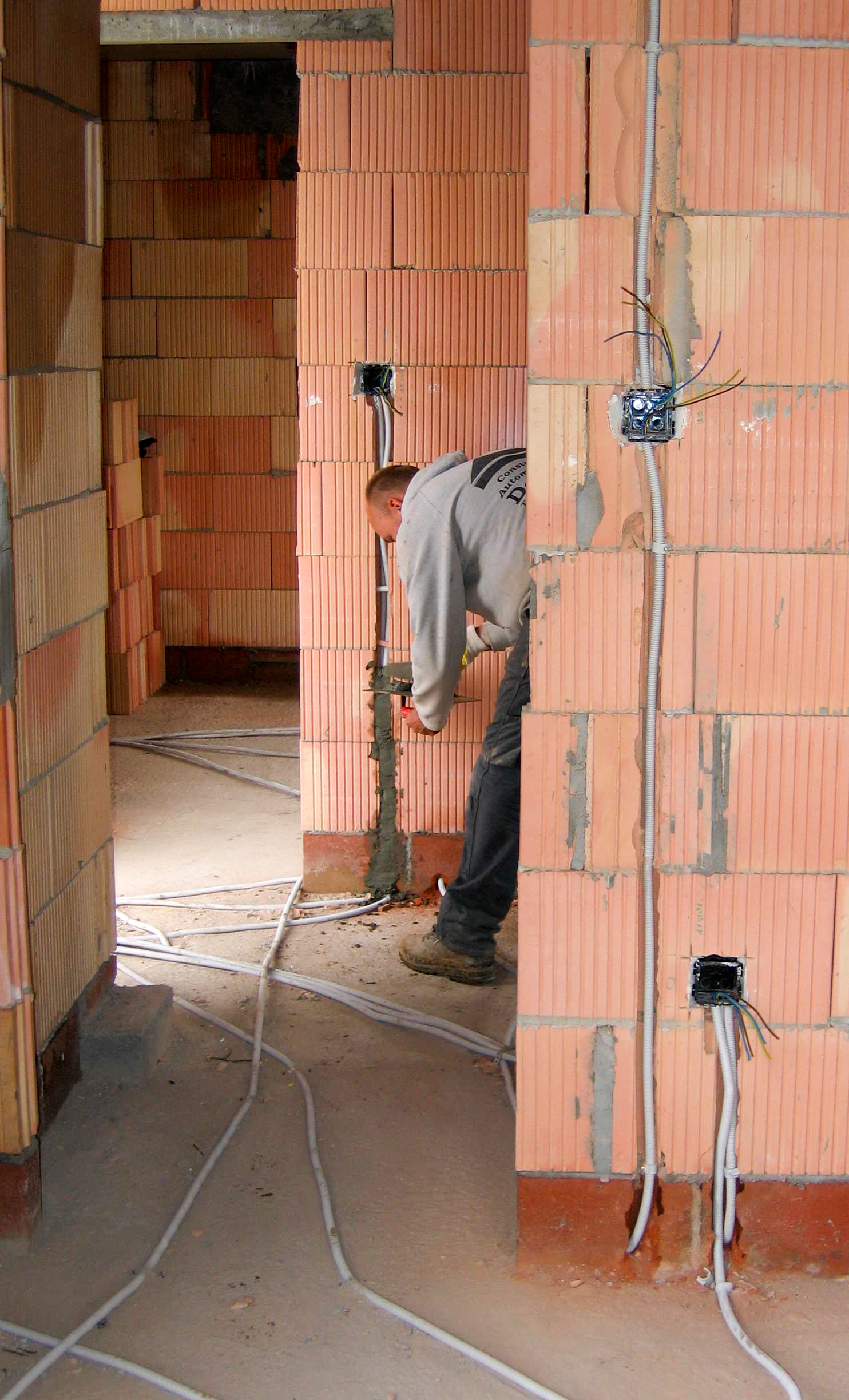
Installing electrical wiring by "chasing" grooves into the masonry structure of the walls of a building

Materials for wiring interior electrical systems in buildings vary depending on:

- Intended use and amount of power demand on the circuit
- Type of occupancy and size of the building
- National and local regulations
- Environment in which the wiring must operate.

Wiring systems in a single family home or duplex, for example, are simple, with relatively low power requirements, infrequent changes to the building structure and layout, usually with dry, moderate temperature and non-corrosive environmental conditions. In a light commercial environment, more frequent wiring changes can be expected, large apparatus may be installed and special conditions of heat or moisture may apply. Heavy industries have more demanding wiring requirements, such as very large currents and higher voltages, frequent changes of equipment layout, corrosive, or wet or explosive atmospheres. In facilities that handle flammable gases or liquids, special rules may govern the installation and wiring of electrical equipment in hazardous areas.

Wires and cables are rated by the circuit voltage, temperature rating and environmental conditions (moisture, sunlight, oil, chemicals) in which they can be used. A wire or cable has a voltage (to neutral) rating and a maximum conductor surface temperature rating. The amount of current a cable or wire can safely carry depends on the installation conditions.

The international standard wire sizes are given in the IEC 60228 standard of the International Electrotechnical Commission. In North America, the American Wire Gauge standard for wire sizes is used.

== Cables ==
=== Modern wiring materials ===
Modern non-metallic sheathed cables, such as (US and Canadian) Types NMB and NMC, consist of two to four wires covered with thermoplastic insulation, plus a wire for Protective Earthing/Grounding (bonding), surrounded by a flexible plastic jacket. In North America and the UK this conductor is usually bare wire but in the UK it is required that this bare Protective Earth (PE) conductor be sheathed in Green/Yellow insulating tubing where the Cable Sheathing has been removed. Most other jurisdictions now require the Protective Earth conductor to be insulated to the same standard as the current carrying conductors with Green/Yellow insulation.

With some cables the individual conductors are wrapped in paper before the plastic jacket is applied.

Special versions of non-metallic sheathed cables, such as US Type UF, are designed for direct underground burial (often with separate mechanical protection) or exterior use where exposure to ultraviolet radiation (UV) is a possibility. These cables differ in having a moisture-resistant construction, lacking paper or other absorbent fillers, and being formulated for UV resistance.

Rubber-like synthetic polymer insulation is used in industrial cables and power cables installed underground because of its superior moisture resistance.

Insulated cables are rated by their allowable operating voltage and their maximum operating temperature at the conductor surface. A cable may carry multiple usage ratings for applications, for example, one rating for dry installations and another when exposed to moisture or oil.

Generally, single conductor building wire in small sizes is solid wire, since the wiring is not required to be very flexible. Building wire conductors larger than 10 AWG (or about 5 mm^{2}) are stranded for flexibility during installation, but are not sufficiently pliable to use as appliance cord.

Cables for industrial, commercial and apartment buildings may contain many insulated conductors in an overall jacket, with helical tape steel or aluminium armour, or steel wire armour, and perhaps as well an overall PVC or lead jacket for protection from moisture and physical damage. Cables intended for very flexible service or in marine applications may be protected by woven bronze wires. Power or communications cables (e.g., computer networking) that are routed in or through air-handling spaces (plenums) of office buildings are required under the model building code to be either encased in metal conduit, or rated for low flame and smoke production.

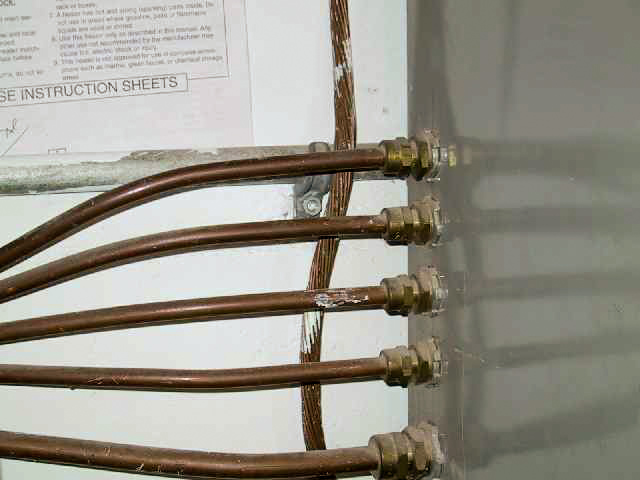
Copper sheathed mineral insulated cables at a panel board

For some industrial uses in steel mills and similar hot environments, no organic material gives satisfactory service. Cables insulated with compressed mica flakes are sometimes used. Another form of high-temperature cable is mineral-insulated cable, with individual conductors placed within a copper tube and the space filled with magnesium oxide powder. The whole assembly is drawn down to smaller sizes, thereby compressing the powder. Such cables have a certified fire resistance rating and are more costly than non–fire-rated cable. They have little flexibility and behave more like rigid conduit rather than flexible cables.

The environment of the installed wires determine how much current a cable is permitted to carry. Because multiple conductors bundled in a cable cannot dissipate heat as easily as single insulated conductors, those circuits are always rated at a lower ampacity. Tables in electrical safety codes give the maximum allowable current based on size of conductor, voltage potential, insulation type and thickness, and the temperature rating of the cable itself. The allowable current will also be different for wet or dry locations, for hot (attic) or cool (underground) locations. In a run of cable through several areas, the part with the lowest rating becomes the rating of the overall run.

Cables usually are secured with special fittings where they enter electrical apparatus; this may be a simple screw clamp for jacketed cables in a dry location, or a polymer-gasketed cable connector that mechanically engages the armour of an armoured cable and provides a water-resistant connection. Special cable fittings may be applied to prevent explosive gases from flowing in the interior of jacketed cables, where the cable passes through areas where flammable gases are present. To prevent loosening of the connections of individual conductors of a cable, cables must be supported near their entrance to devices and at regular intervals along their runs. In tall buildings, special designs are required to support the conductors of vertical runs of cable. Generally, only one cable per fitting is permitted, unless the fitting is rated or listed for multiple cables.

Special cable constructions and termination techniques are required for cables installed in ships. Such assemblies are subjected to environmental and mechanical extremes. Therefore, in addition to electrical and fire safety concerns, such cables may also be required to be pressure-resistant where they penetrate a vessel's bulkheads. They must also resist corrosion caused by salt water or salt spray, which is accomplished through the use of thicker, specially constructed jackets, and by tinning the individual wire stands.

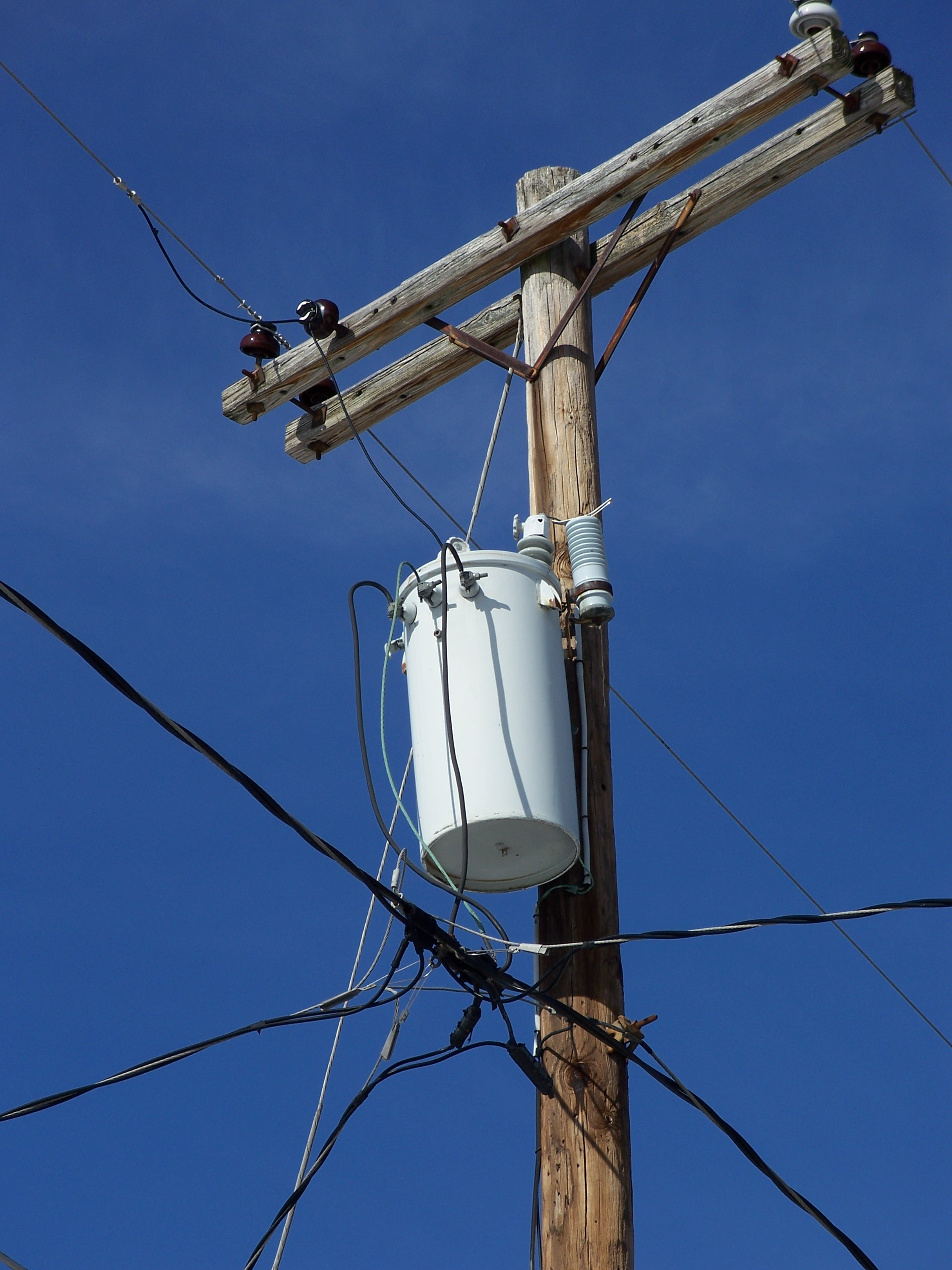
US single-phase residential power distribution transformer, showing the two insulated line conductors and the bare neutral conductor (derived from the earthed center-tap of the transformer). The distribution supporting cantenaries are also shown.

In North American practice, for residential and light commercial buildings fed with a single-phase split 120/240 service, an overhead cable from a transformer on a power pole is run to the service entrance point. The cable is a three conductor twisted "triplex" cable with a bare neutral and two insulated conductors, with no overall cable jacket. The neutral conductor is often a supporting "messenger" steel wire, which is used to support the insulated line conductors.

=== Copper conductors ===
Electrical devices often use copper conductors because of their properties, including their high electrical conductivity, tensile strength, ductility, creep resistance, corrosion resistance, thermal conductivity, coefficient of thermal expansion, solderability, resistance to electrical overloads, compatibility with electrical insulators, and ease of installation. Copper is used in many types of electrical wiring.

=== Aluminium conductors ===
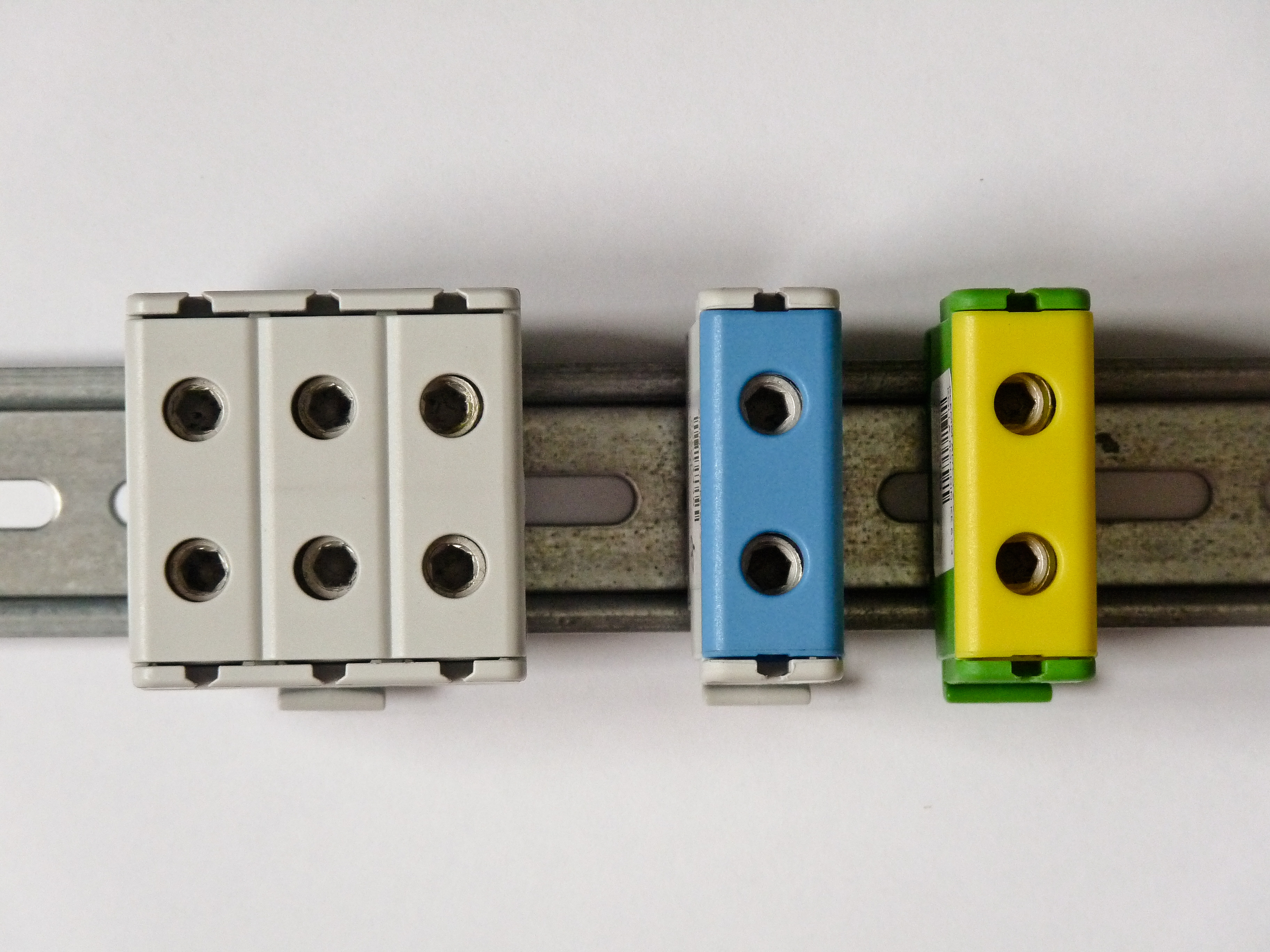
Terminal blocks for joining aluminium and copper conductors. The terminal blocks may be mounted on a DIN rail.

Aluminium wire was common in North American residential wiring from the late 1960s to mid-1970s due to the rising cost of copper. Because of its greater resistivity, aluminium wiring requires larger conductors than copper. For instance, instead of 14 AWG (American wire gauge) copper wire, aluminium wiring would need to be 12 AWG on a typical 15 ampere lighting circuit, though local building codes vary.

Solid aluminium conductors were originally made in the 1960s from a utility-grade aluminium alloy that had undesirable properties for a building wire, and were used with wiring devices intended for copper conductors. These practices were found to cause defective connections and fire hazards. In the early 1970s new aluminium wire made from one of several special alloys was introduced, and all devices – breakers, switches, receptacles, splice connectors, wire nuts, etc. — were specially designed for the purpose. These newer aluminium wires and special designs address problems with junctions between dissimilar metals, oxidation on metal surfaces, and mechanical effects that occur as different metals expand at different rates with increases in temperature.

Unlike copper, aluminium has a tendency to creep or cold-flow under pressure, so older plain steel screw clamped connections could become loose over time. Newer electrical devices designed for aluminium conductors have features intended to compensate for this effect. Unlike copper, aluminium forms an insulating oxide layer on the surface. This is sometimes addressed by coating aluminium conductors with an antioxidant paste (containing zinc dust in a low-residue polybutene base) at joints, or by applying a mechanical termination designed to break through the oxide layer during installation.

Some terminations on wiring devices designed only for copper wire would overheat under heavy current load and cause fires when used with aluminium conductors. Revised standards for wire materials and wiring devices (such as the CO/ALR "copper-aluminium-revised" designation) were developed to reduce these problems. While larger sizes are still used to feed power to electrical panels and large devices, aluminium wiring for residential use has acquired a poor reputation and has fallen out of favour.

Aluminium conductors are still heavily used for bulk power transmission, electric power distribution, and large feeder circuits with heavy current loads, due to the various advantages they offer over copper wiring. Aluminium conductors both cost and weigh less than copper conductors, so a much larger cross sectional area can be used for the same weight and price. This can compensate for the higher resistance and lower mechanical strength of aluminium, meaning the larger cross sectional area is needed to achieve comparable current capacity and other features. Aluminium conductors must be installed with compatible connectors and special care must be taken to ensure the contact surface does not oxidise.

== Raceways and cable runs ==
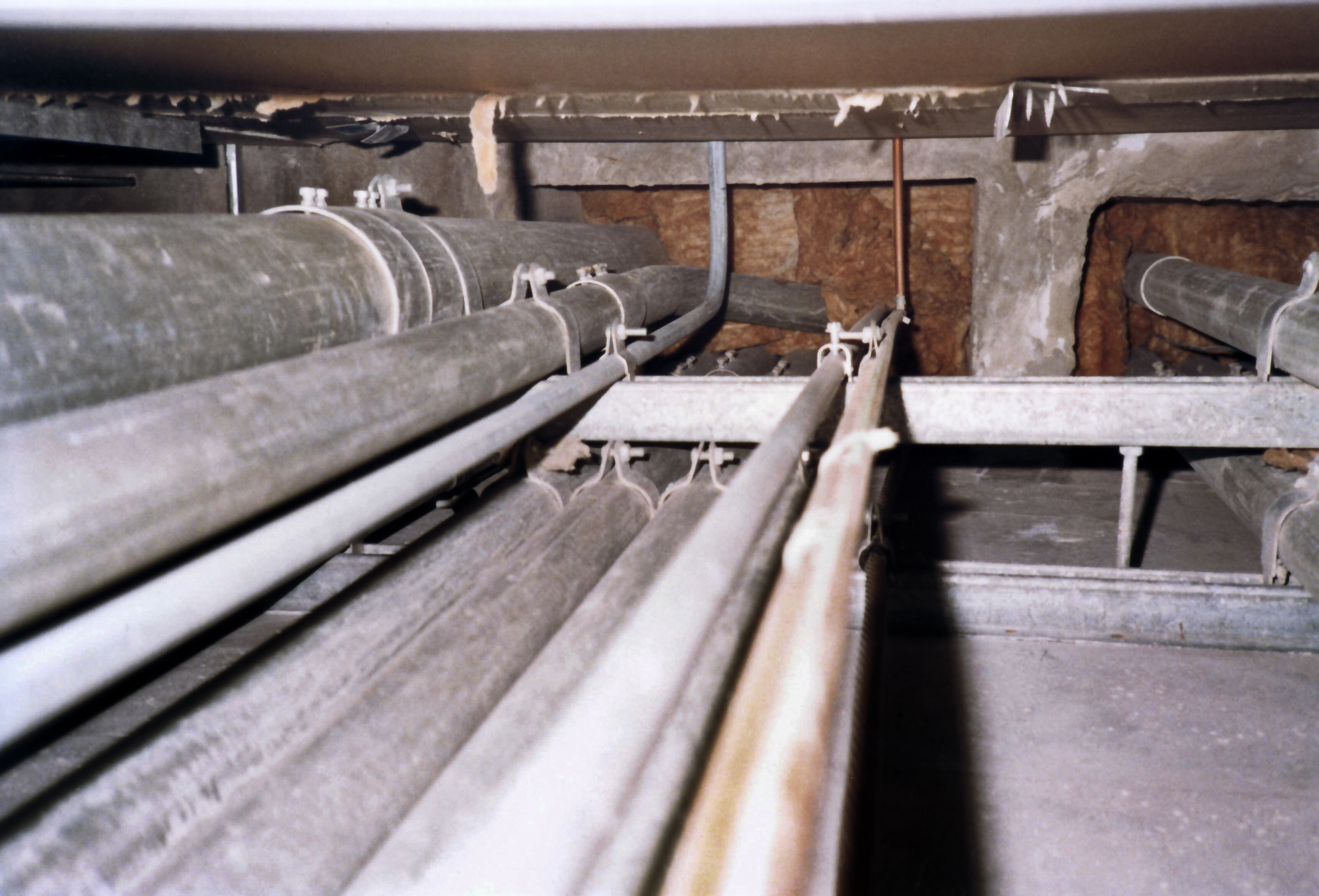
Electrical conduit risers, seen inside fire-resistance–rated shaft, as seen entering bottom of a firestop. The firestop is made of firestop mortar on top, rockwool on the bottom. Raceways are used to protect cables from damage.

Insulated wires may be run in one of several forms between electrical devices. This may be a specialised bendable pipe, called a conduit, or one of several varieties of metal (rigid steel or aluminium) or non-metallic (PVC or HDPE) tubing. Rectangular cross-section metal or PVC wire troughs (North America) or trunking (UK) may be used if many circuits are required. Wires run underground may be run in plastic tubing encased in concrete, but metal elbows may be used in severe pulls. Wiring in exposed areas, for example factory floors, may be run in cable trays or rectangular raceways having lids.

Where wiring, or raceways that hold the wiring, must traverse fire-resistance rated walls and floors, the openings are required by local building codes to be firestopped. In cases where safety-critical wiring must be kept operational during an accidental fire, fireproofing must be applied to maintain circuit integrity in a manner to comply with a product's certification listing. The nature and thickness of any passive fire protection materials used in conjunction with wiring and raceways has a quantifiable impact upon the ampacity derating, because the thermal insulation properties needed for fire resistance also inhibit air cooling of power conductors.

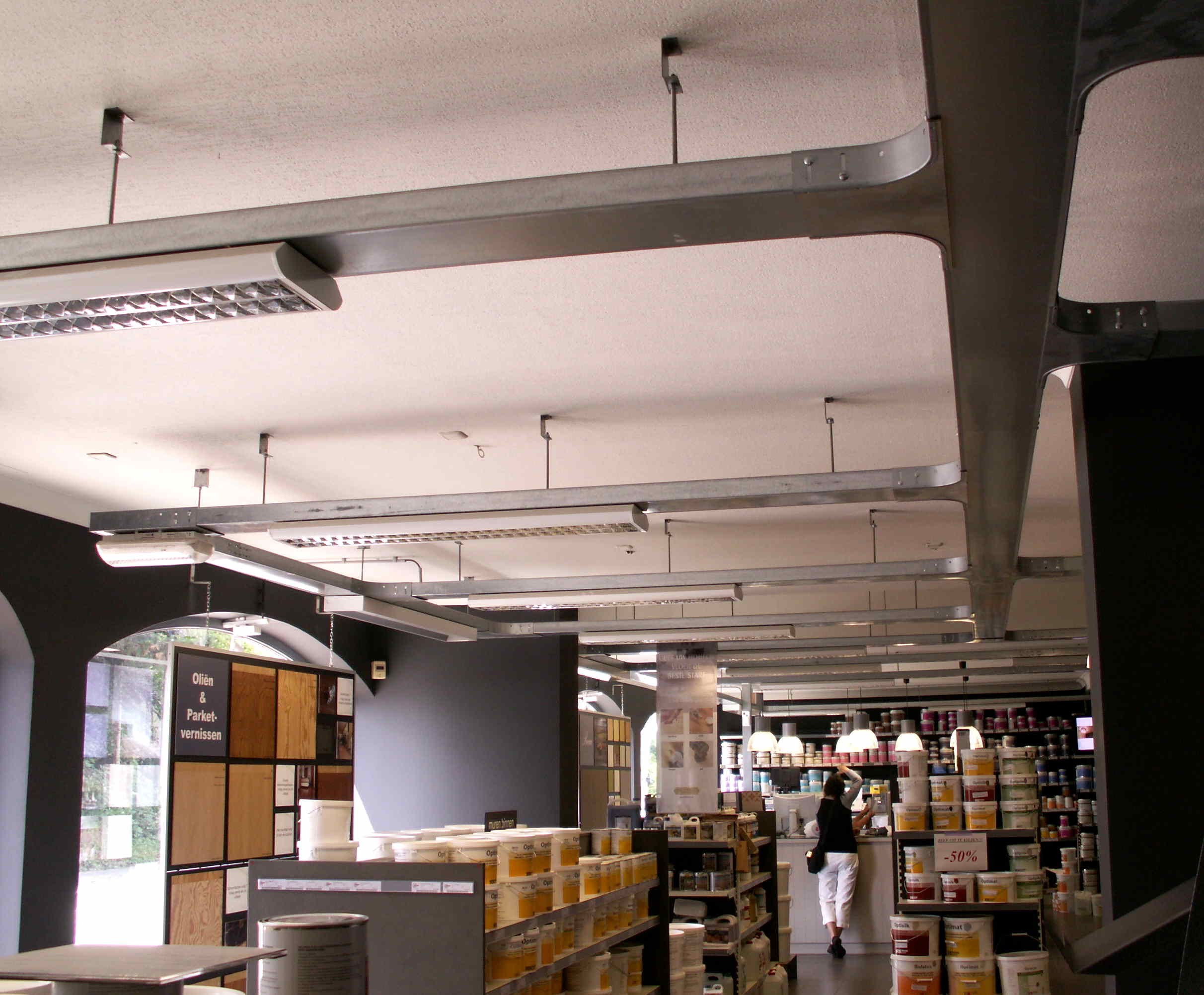
A cable tray can be used in stores and dwellings.

Cable trays are used in industrial areas where many insulated cables are run together. Individual cables can exit the tray at any point, simplifying the wiring installation and reducing the labour cost for installing new cables. Power cables may have fittings in the tray to maintain clearance between the conductors, but small control wiring is often installed without any intentional spacing between cables.

Local electrical regulations may restrict or place special requirements on mixing of voltage levels within one cable tray. Good design practices may segregate, for example, low level measurement or signal cables from trays carrying high power branch circuits, to prevent induction of noise into sensitive circuits.

Since wires run in conduits or underground cannot dissipate heat as easily as in open air, and since adjacent circuits contribute induced currents, wiring regulations give rules to establish the current capacity (ampacity).

Special sealed fittings are used for wiring routed through potentially explosive atmospheres.

== Bus bars, bus duct, cable bus ==
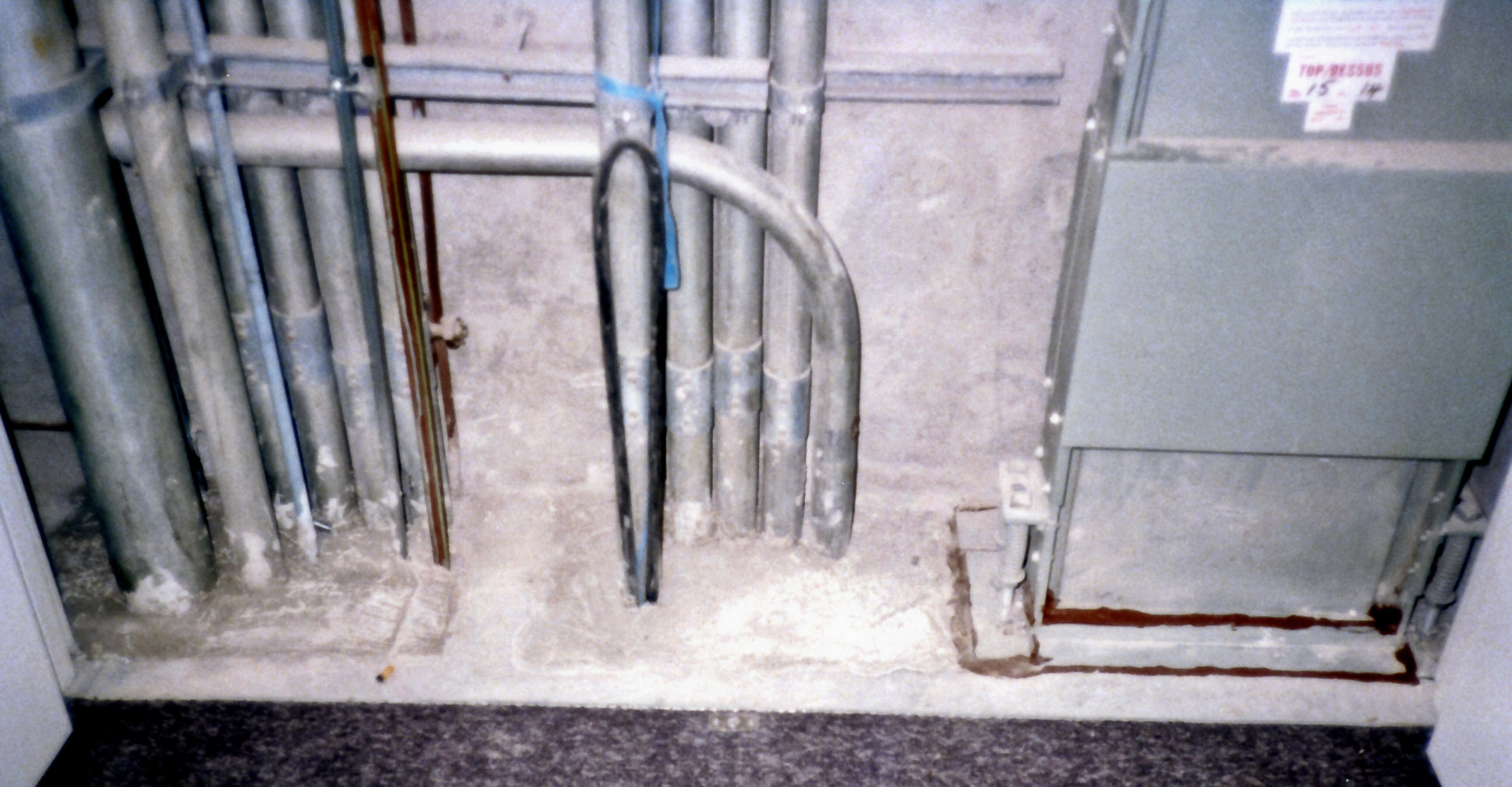
Topside of firestop with penetrants consisting of electrical conduit on the left and a bus duct on the right. The firestop consists of firestop mortar on top and rockwool on the bottom, for a two-hour fire-resistance rating.

For very high currents in electrical apparatus, and for high currents distributed through a building, bus bars can be used. (The term "bus" is a contraction of the Latin omnibus – meaning "for all".) Each live ("hot") conductor of such a system is a rigid piece of copper or aluminium, usually in flat bars (but sometimes as tubing or other shapes). Open bus bars are never used in publicly accessible areas, although they are used in manufacturing plants and power company switch yards to gain the benefit of air cooling. A variation is to use heavy cables, especially where it is desirable to transpose or "roll" phases.

In industrial applications, conductor bars are often pre-assembled with insulators in grounded enclosures. This assembly, known as bus duct or busway, can be used for connections to large switchgear or for bringing the main power feed into a building. A form of bus duct known as "plug-in bus" is used to distribute power down the length of a building; it is constructed to allow tap-off switches or motor controllers to be installed at designated places along the bus. The big advantage of this scheme is the ability to remove or add a branch circuit without removing voltage from the whole duct.

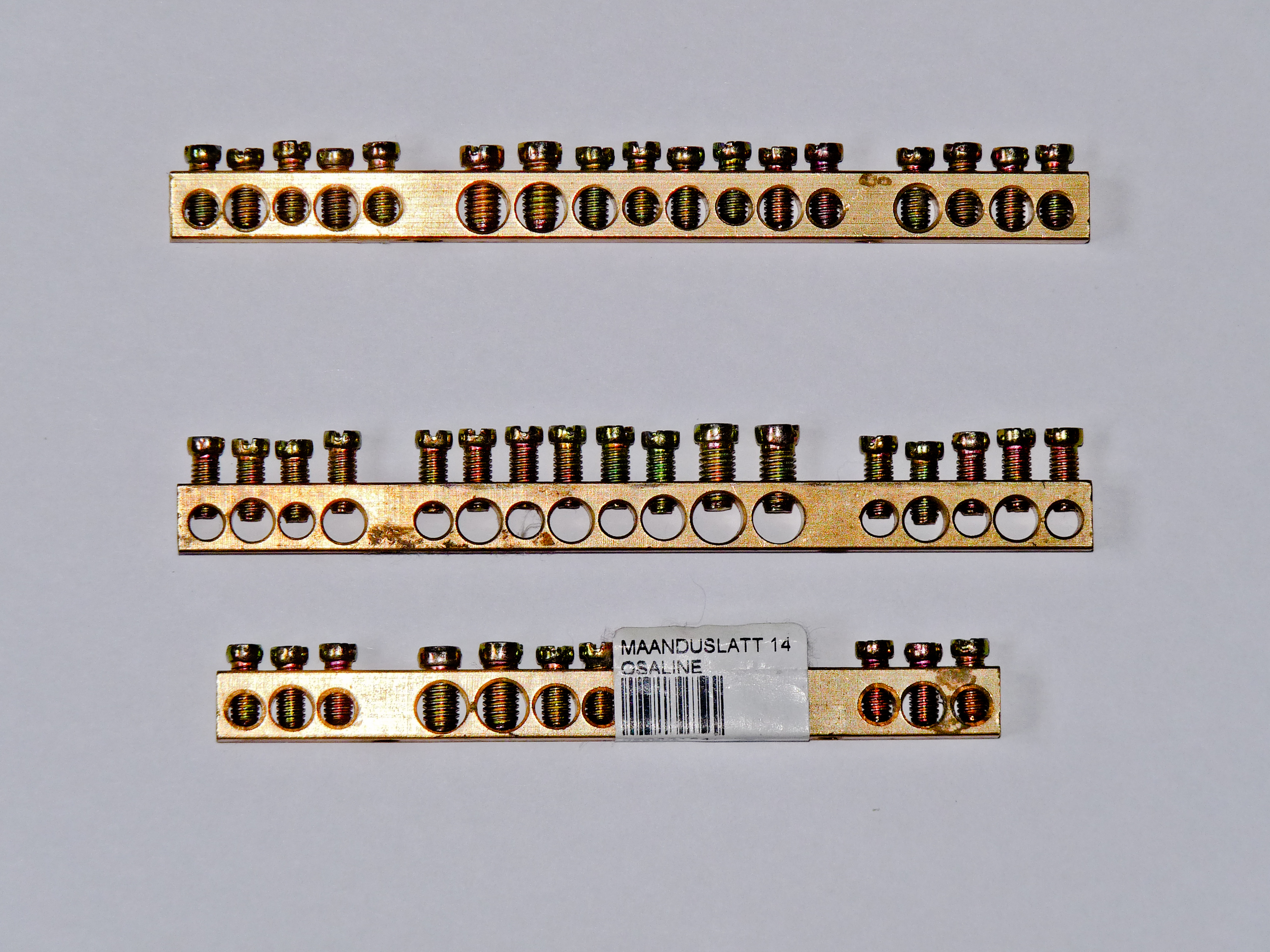
Busbars for distributing protective earth (ground)

Bus ducts may have all phase conductors in the same enclosure (non-isolated bus), or may have each conductor separated by a grounded barrier from the adjacent phases (segregated bus). For conducting large currents between devices, a cable bus is used.

For very large currents in generating stations or substations, where it is difficult to provide circuit protection, an isolated-phase bus is used. Each phase of the circuit is run in a separate grounded metal enclosure. The only fault possible is a phase-to-ground fault, since the enclosures are separated. This type of bus can be rated up to 50,000 amperes and up to hundreds of kilovolts (during normal service, not just for faults), but is not used for building wiring in the conventional sense.

== Electrical panels ==
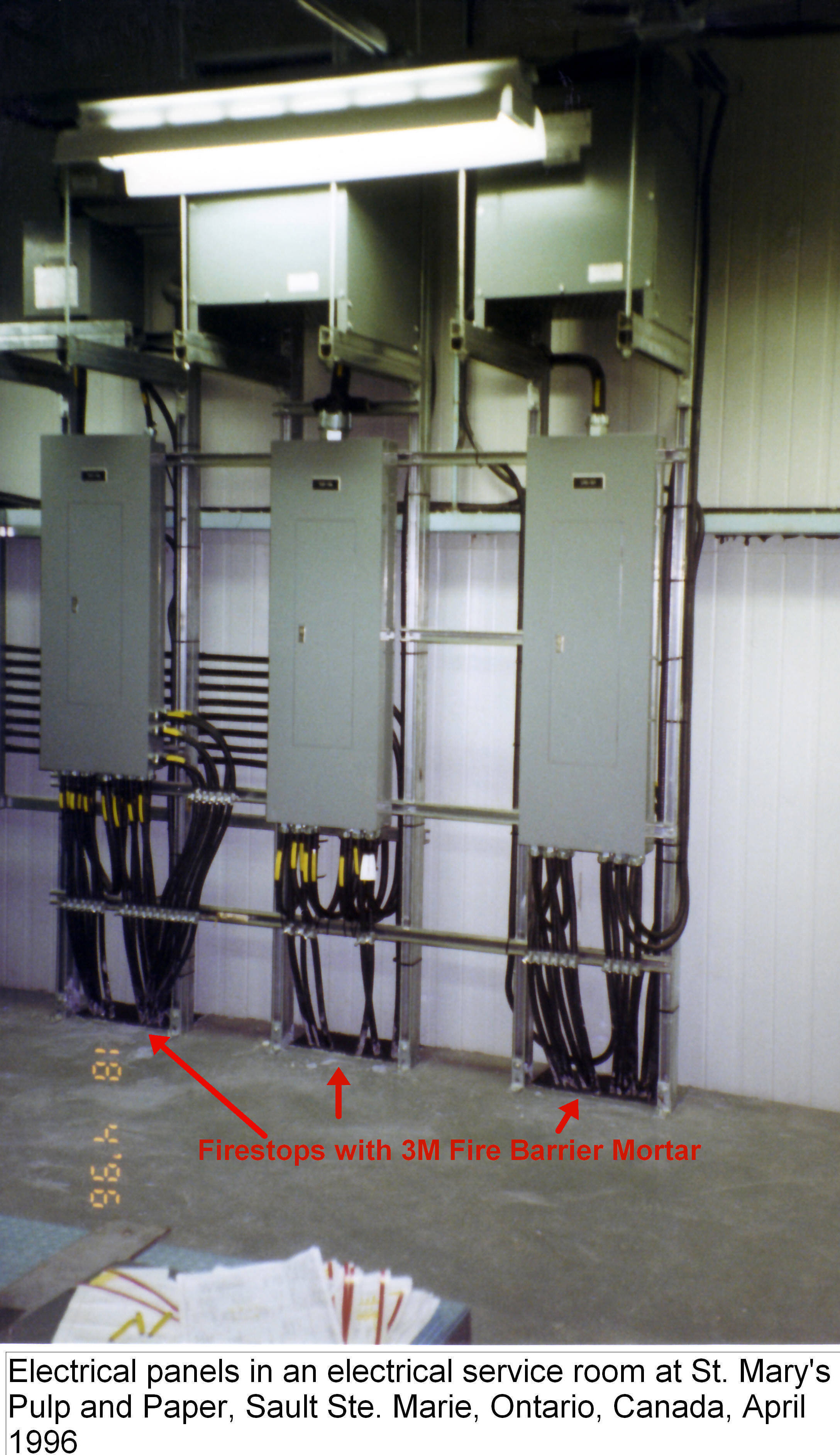
Electrical panels, cables and firestops in an electrical service room at a paper mill in Ontario, Canada

Electrical panels are easily accessible junction boxes used to reroute and switch electrical services. The term is often used to refer to circuit breaker panels or fuse boxes. Local codes can specify physical clearance around the panels.

== Degradation by pests ==
Squirrels, rats, and other rodents may gnaw on unprotected wiring, causing fire and shock hazards. This is especially true of PVC-insulated telephone and computer network cables. Several techniques have been developed to deter these pests, including insulation loaded with pepper dust.

== Early wiring methods ==
The first interior power wiring systems used conductors that were bare or covered with cloth, which were secured by staples to the framing of the building or on running boards. Where conductors went through walls, they were protected with cloth tape. Splices were done similarly to telegraph connections, and soldered for security. Underground conductors were insulated with wrappings of cloth tape soaked in pitch, and laid in wooden troughs which were then buried. Such wiring systems were unsatisfactory because of the danger of electrocution and fire, plus the high labour cost for such installations. The first electrical codes arose in the 1880s with the commercial introduction of electrical power; however, many conflicting standards existed for the selection of wire sizes and other design rules for electrical installations, and a need was seen to introduce uniformity on the grounds of safety.

=== Knob and tube (US) ===
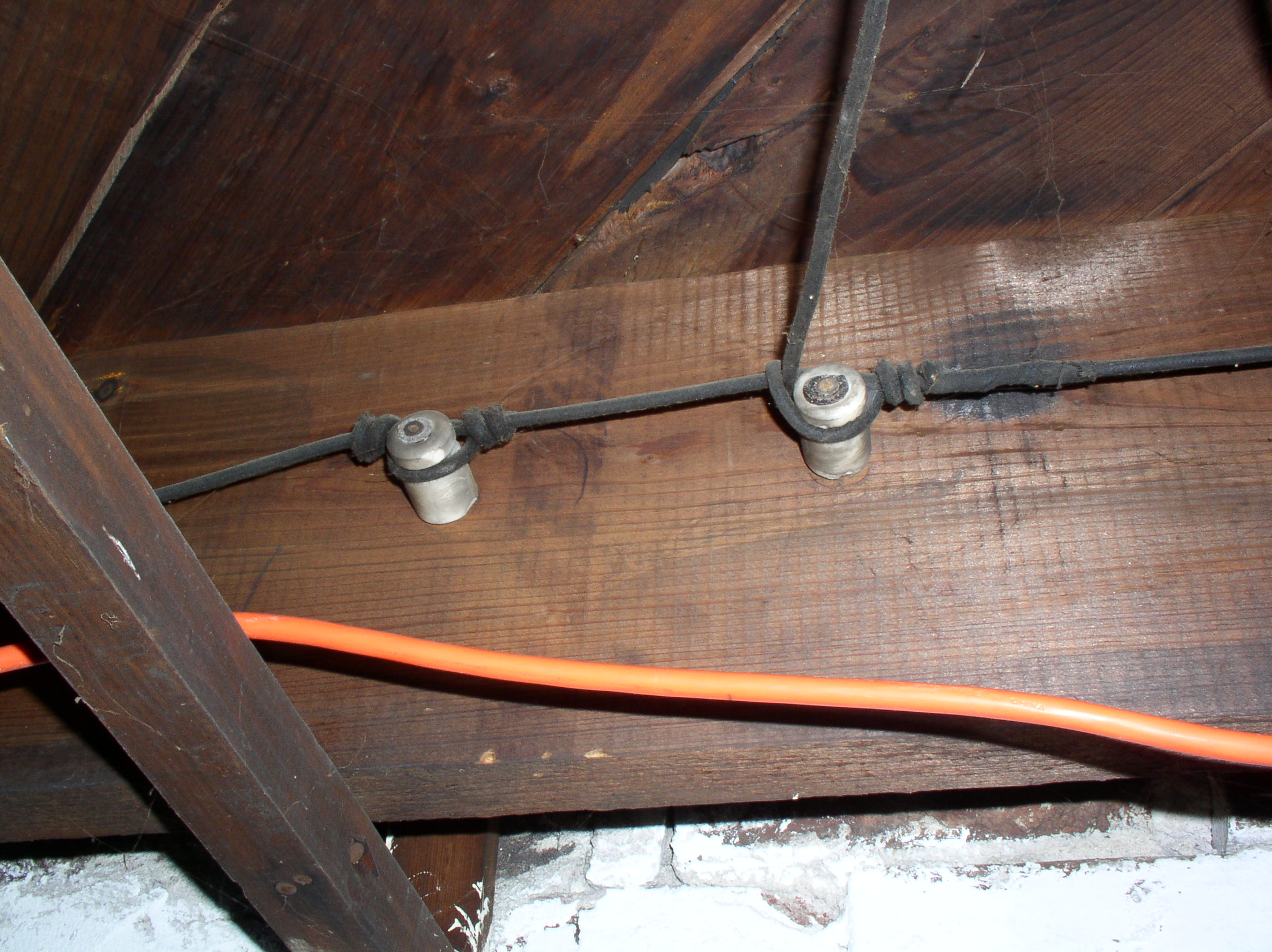
Knob-and-tube wiring (The orange cable is an unrelated extension cord.)

The earliest standardized method of wiring in buildings, in common use in North America from about 1880 to the 1930s, was knob and tube (K&T) wiring: single conductors were run through cavities between the structural members in walls and ceilings, with ceramic tubes forming protective channels through joists and ceramic knobs attached to the structural members to provide air between the wire and the lumber and to support the wires. Since air was free to circulate over the wires, smaller conductors could be used than required in cables. By arranging wires on opposite sides of building structural members, some protection was afforded against short-circuits that can be caused by driving a nail into both conductors simultaneously.

By the 1940s, the labor cost of installing two conductors rather than one cable resulted in a decline in new knob-and-tube installations. However, the US code still allows new K&T wiring installations in special situations (some rural and industrial applications).

=== Metal-sheathed wires ===
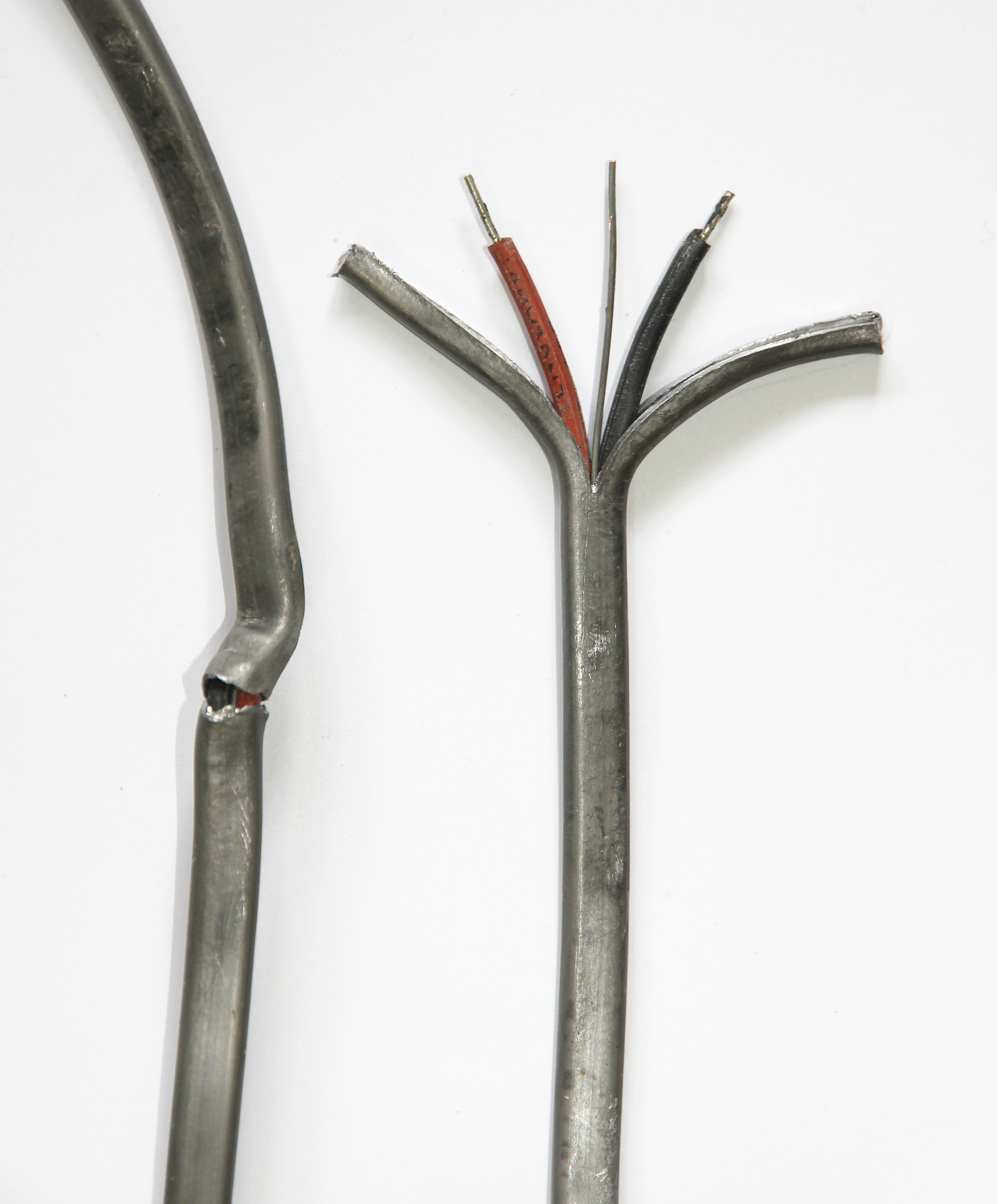
Lead-cased electrical cable from a circa 1912 house in southern England. Two conductors are sheathed in red and black rubber, and the central earth wire is bare. These cables are dangerous because the sheath is prone to split if repeatedly flexed.

In the United Kingdom, an early form of insulated cable, introduced in 1896, consisted of two impregnated-paper-insulated conductors in an overall lead sheath. Joints were soldered, and special fittings were used for lamp holders and switches. These cables were similar to underground telegraph and telephone cables of the time. Paper-insulated cables proved unsuitable for interior wiring installations because very careful workmanship was required on the lead sheaths to ensure moisture did not affect the insulation.

A system later invented in the UK in 1908 employed vulcanised-rubber insulated wire enclosed in a strip metal sheath. The metal sheath was bonded to each metal wiring device to ensure earthing continuity.

A system developed in Germany called "Kuhlo wire" used one, two, or three rubber-insulated wires in a brass or lead-coated iron sheet tube, with a crimped seam. The enclosure could also be used as a return conductor. Kuhlo wire could be run exposed on surfaces and painted, or embedded in plaster. Special outlet and junction boxes were made for lamps and switches, made either of porcelain or sheet steel. The crimped seam was not considered as watertight as the Stannos wire used in England, which had a soldered sheath.

A somewhat similar system called "concentric wiring" was introduced in the United States around 1905. In this system, an insulated electrical wire was wrapped with copper tape which was then soldered, forming the grounded (return) conductor of the wiring system. The bare metal sheath, at earth potential, was considered safe to touch. While companies such as General Electric manufactured fittings for the system and a few buildings were wired with it, it was never adopted into the US National Electrical Code. Drawbacks of the system were that special fittings were required, and that any defect in the connection of the sheath would result in the sheath becoming energised.

=== Other historical wiring methods ===
Armored cables with two rubber-insulated conductors in a flexible metal sheath were used as early as 1906, and were considered at the time a better method than open knob-and-tube wiring, although much more expensive.

The first rubber-insulated cables for US building wiring were introduced in 1922 with US patent 1458803, Burley, Harry & Rooney, Henry, "Insulated electric wire", issued 12 June 1923, assigned to Boston Insulated Wire and Cable. These were two or more solid copper electrical wires with rubber insulation, plus woven cotton cloth over each conductor for protection of the insulation, with an overall woven jacket, usually impregnated with tar as a protection from moisture. Waxed paper was used as a filler and separator.

Over time, rubber-insulated cables become brittle because of exposure to atmospheric oxygen, so they must be handled with care and are usually replaced during renovations. When switches, socket outlets or light fixtures are replaced, the mere act of tightening connections may cause hardened insulation to flake off the conductors. Rubber insulation further inside the cable often is in better condition than the insulation exposed at connections, due to reduced exposure to oxygen.

The sulfur in vulcanized rubber insulation attacked bare copper wire so the conductors were tinned to prevent this. The conductors reverted to being bare when rubber ceased to be used.

Diagram of a simple electrical cable with three insulated conductors, with IEC colour scheme

About 1950, PVC insulation and jackets were introduced, especially for residential wiring. About the same time, single conductors with a thinner PVC insulation and a thin nylon jacket (e.g. US Type THN, THHN, etc.) became common.

The simplest form of cable has two insulated conductors twisted together to form a unit. Such non-jacketed cables with two (or more) conductors are used only for extra-low voltage signal and control applications such as doorbell wiring.

Other methods of securing wiring that are now obsolete include:

- Re-use of existing gas pipes when converting gas lighting installations to electric lighting. Insulated conductors were pulled through the pipes that had formerly supplied the gas lamps. Although used occasionally, this method risked insulation damage from sharp edges inside the pipe at each joint.
- Wood mouldings with grooves cut for single conductor wires, covered by a wooden cap strip. These were prohibited in North American electrical codes by 1928. Wooden moulding was also used to some degree in the UK, but was never permitted by German and Austrian rules.
- A system of flexible twin cords supported by glass or porcelain buttons was used near the turn of the 20th century in Europe, but was soon replaced by other methods.
- During the first years of the 20th century, various patented forms of wiring system such as Bergman and Peschel tubing were used to protect wiring; these used very thin fibre tubes, or metal tubes which were also used as return conductors.
- In Austria, wires were concealed by embedding a rubber tube in a groove in the wall, plastering over it, then removing the tube and pulling wires through the cavity.

Metal moulding systems, with a flattened oval section consisting of a base strip and a snap-on cap channel, were more costly than open wiring or wooden moulding, but could be easily run on wall surfaces. Similar surface mounted raceway wiring systems are still available today.

== See also ==
- 10603 – a frequently used MIL-SPEC compliant wire
- Bus duct
- Cable entry system
- Cable gland
- Cable management
- Cable tray
- Domestic AC power plugs and sockets
- Electric power distribution
- Electrical code
- Electrical conduit
- Electrical room
- Electrical wiring in North America
- Electrical wiring in the United Kingdom
- Grounding
- Ground and neutral
- Home wiring
- Industrial and multiphase power plugs and sockets
- Oxygen-free copper
- Portable cord
- Power cord
- Restriction of Hazardous Substances Directive (RoHS)
- Single-phase electric power
- Structured cabling
- Three-phase electric power
- Tri-rated cable

== Bibliography ==
- Croft, Terrell (1915). Wiring of Finished Buildings: A Practical Treatise, Dealing with the Commercial and the Technical Phases of the Subject, for the Central Station Man, Electrical Contractor and Wireman, first edition. New York: McGraw-Hill Book Company. OCLC 3491162.
