= Electric switchboard =

Equipment that distributes electric power

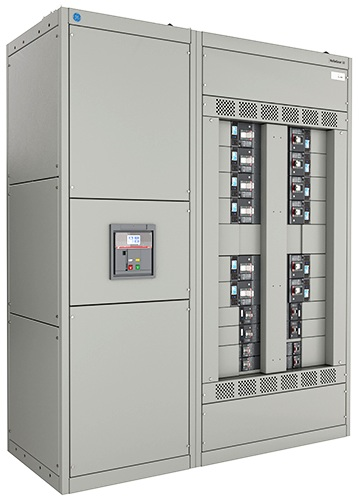
A low-voltage switchboard

A modern electric switchboard

An electric switchboard is a piece of equipment that distributes electric power from one or more sources of supply to several smaller load circuits. It is an assembly of one or more panels, each of which contains switching devices for the protection and control of circuits fed from the switchboard. Several manufacturers make switchboards used in industry, commercial buildings, telecommunication facilities, oil and gas plants, data centers, health care, and other buildings, and onboard large ships. A switchboard is divided into different interconnected sections, generally consisting of a main section and a distribution section. These two sections are sometimes replaced by a combination section, which is a section that can fulfill the roles of both of the aforementioned sections. Switchboards can also sometimes come with an auxiliary section that is used to house devices that cannot be housed in the same section as other devices.

== Definition ==
The U.S. National Electrical Code (NEC) defines a switchboard as "a large single panel, frame, or assembly of panels on which are mounted, on the face, back, or both, switches, over-current and other protective devices, buses, and usually instruments". The role of a switchboard is to allow the division of the current supplied to the switchboard into smaller currents for further distribution and to provide switching, current protection and (possibly) metering for those various currents. In general, switchboards may distribute power to transformers, panelboards, control equipment, and, ultimately, to individual system loads.

== Components ==
Inside a switchboard there will be one or more busbars. These are flat strips of copper or aluminum, to which the switchgear is connected. Busbars carry large currents through the switchboard and are supported by insulators. Bare busbars are common, but many types are now manufactured with an insulating cover on the bars, leaving only connection points exposed.

In a modern switchboard, the operator is protected from electrical injury by metal-enclosed circuit breakers, switches, and fuses. There may also be instruments and controls for the supply of electricity to the switchboard. For example, a switchboard for a bank of electrical generators, especially frequency would have control of AC power and load sharing, and instruments for frequency, voltage, current, and energy, with perhaps a synchroscope. A main switchboard is a large electrical switchboard that connects to the grid and distributes power to other smaller switchboards on the site.

== See also ==
- Electrical enclosure
- Tri-rated cable
