= Tri-rated cable =

Type of electrical cable

Tri-rated cable is a high temperature, flame retardant electrical wire designed for use inside electrical equipment.

Tri-rated cable meets the requirements of three different international standards: BS 6231, UL 758, and CSA 22.2. Combining three standards in one product makes tri-rated cable suitable for use in equipment that is required to meet both North American and British wiring regulations.

== Construction ==
Tri-rated cables are constructed with a flexible stranded copper conductor (Class 5 according to IEC 60228), and insulation of heat resistant PVC. Tri-rated cable is manufactured in a variety of insulation colours, including brown, orange, yellow, pink, and dark blue.

== Uses ==
Tri-rated cable is designed for use in switch, control, relay and instrumentation panels of power circuits, and as internal connectors in rectifier equipment, motor starters and motor controllers.

== Standards ==
=== BS 6231 ===
BS 6231 is a British Standard, last revised in 2006 by the BSI Group. This standard specifies the performance and construction requirements of electrical cables that are single core, non-sheathed, PVC-insulated and rated 600/1000 V. Wire meeting the requirements of type CK of this standard is used as tri-rated wire. This standard specifies a nominal insulation thickness of 0.8mm for wire sizes 0.5mm^{2} to 6mm^{2}. Larger wires sizes are required to have thicker insulation.

Wire that is approved to BS 6231 might not carry the UL and CSA ratings, if, for example, the wire is not suitable for use at the higher 105 °C temperature that is specified for those ratings. In that case, the wire is not tri-rated.

According to UL 758, the maximum operating temperature of tri-rated cable is 105 °C. British Standard BS 6231 requires only a maximum operating temperature of 90 °C for continuous use. UL and CSA give tri-rated cable a voltage rating of 600 V, while it is rated at 1000 V in the BS 6231 standard.

=== UL 758 ===
UL 758 is a standard maintained by UL LLC, principally for the U.S. market. This standard covers "Appliance Wiring Material" ("AWM"), including single-insulated conductors and individual insulated conductors. Wire meeting the requirements of UL Style 1015 is considered tri-rated wire. UL Style 1015 specifies wire sized from 28 to 9 AWG, with a maximum temperature of 105 °C, a voltage rating of 600 V, and PVC insulation with a thickness of 1/32 inch (0.8 mm).

=== CSA 22.2 ===
CSA 22.2 Part 210 covers "Appliance Wiring Material". CSA 22.2 Part 127 covers "Equipment and lead wires".

== See also ==
- Electrical wiring
- Power cable
- Low smoke zero halogen
