= Microphonics =

Sound phenomenon

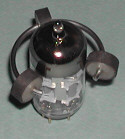
Audio vacuum tube with externally fitted microphonics damper

Microphonics, microphony, or microphonism describes the phenomenon wherein certain components in electronic devices transform mechanical vibrations into an undesired electrical signal (noise). The term comes from analogy with a microphone, which is intentionally designed to convert vibrations to electrical signals.

== Description ==
When electronic equipment was built using vacuum tubes, microphonics were often a serious design problem. The charged elements in the vacuum tubes can mechanically vibrate, changing the distance between the elements, producing charge flows in and out of the tube in a manner identical to a capacitor microphone. A system sufficiently susceptible to microphonics could experience audio feedback and make noises if jarred or bumped. To minimize these effects, some vacuum tubes were made with thicker internal insulating plates and more supports, and tube-socket assemblies were sometimes shock-mounted by means of small rubber grommets placed in the screw holes to isolate them from vibration.

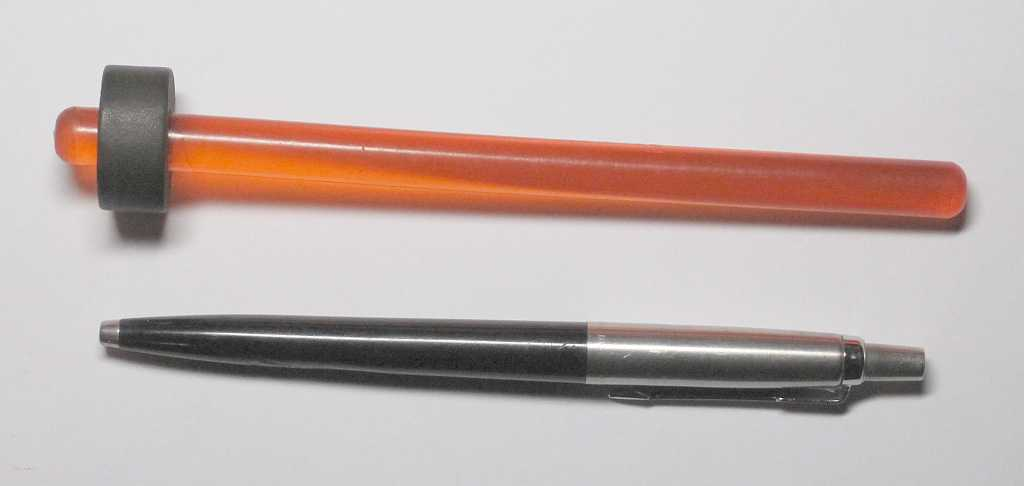
Radio and TV repairman's tool for testing microphony in vacuum tubes. The black rubber grommet gives the tube a firm but safe impact. Pen for scale.

A special tool, called a valve hammer or tube hammer, was sometimes used to safely tap the device suspected of being microphonic while it was operating, so checking if such a tap would produce objectionable audio effects.

Microwave tube designers took numerous steps to reduce microphonics in klystrons. Where tuning was essential, a compromise usually was made between the resistance of the klystron to microphonism and the obtainable performance.

With the advent of solid-state electronics (transistors), this major source of microphonics was eliminated but smaller sources still remain.

The ceramic EIA Class 2 dielectrics used in high-κ capacitors ("Z5U" and "X7R") are piezoelectric and directly transform mechanical vibration into a voltage in exactly the same way as a ceramic or piezoelectric microphone. Film capacitors using soft (mechanically compliant) dielectric materials can also be microphonic due to vibrational energy physically moving the plates of the capacitor. Likewise, variable capacitors using air as a dielectric are vulnerable to vibrations moving the plates. Capacitors using glass as the dielectric, while quite expensive, can be made to be essentially non microphonic.

Wiring, cables and even printed circuit boards (PCB) can also exhibit microphonics as charged conductors move around, and various materials can develop triboelectric charges (a type of static electricity) that couple to the electronic circuits.

Guitar amplifiers that incorporate the electronic chassis into the same cabinet as the speaker are susceptible to microphonics. Though a guitar amplifier's microphonic distortion is sometimes appreciated as part of the "special sound" of a guitar amplifier, a faulty vacuum tube or other component can cause out-of-control positive feedback. Unwanted microphonics-related audible distortions can often be alleviated by using commercially available vacuum tube mechanical dampers.

The term may also be used to describe a video artifact common in older video cameras. Before the introduction of solid-state charge-coupled device (CCD) sensors to produce the image, vacuum tubes performed this task. Loud noises in the studio, such as rock bands or gunshot effects, would cause the tubes to vibrate, producing a characteristic undesirable horizontal banding in the image.

The effect can also be observed when operating a record player in the same room as the loudspeakers. Depending on the construction of the player, the sound may acoustically couple into the record player's dust cover or other mechanical parts and cause a feedback loop into the pickup cartridge.

== See also ==
- Audio spill
- Cable grommet
- Crosstalk
- Ringing (signal)
