= Portable cord =

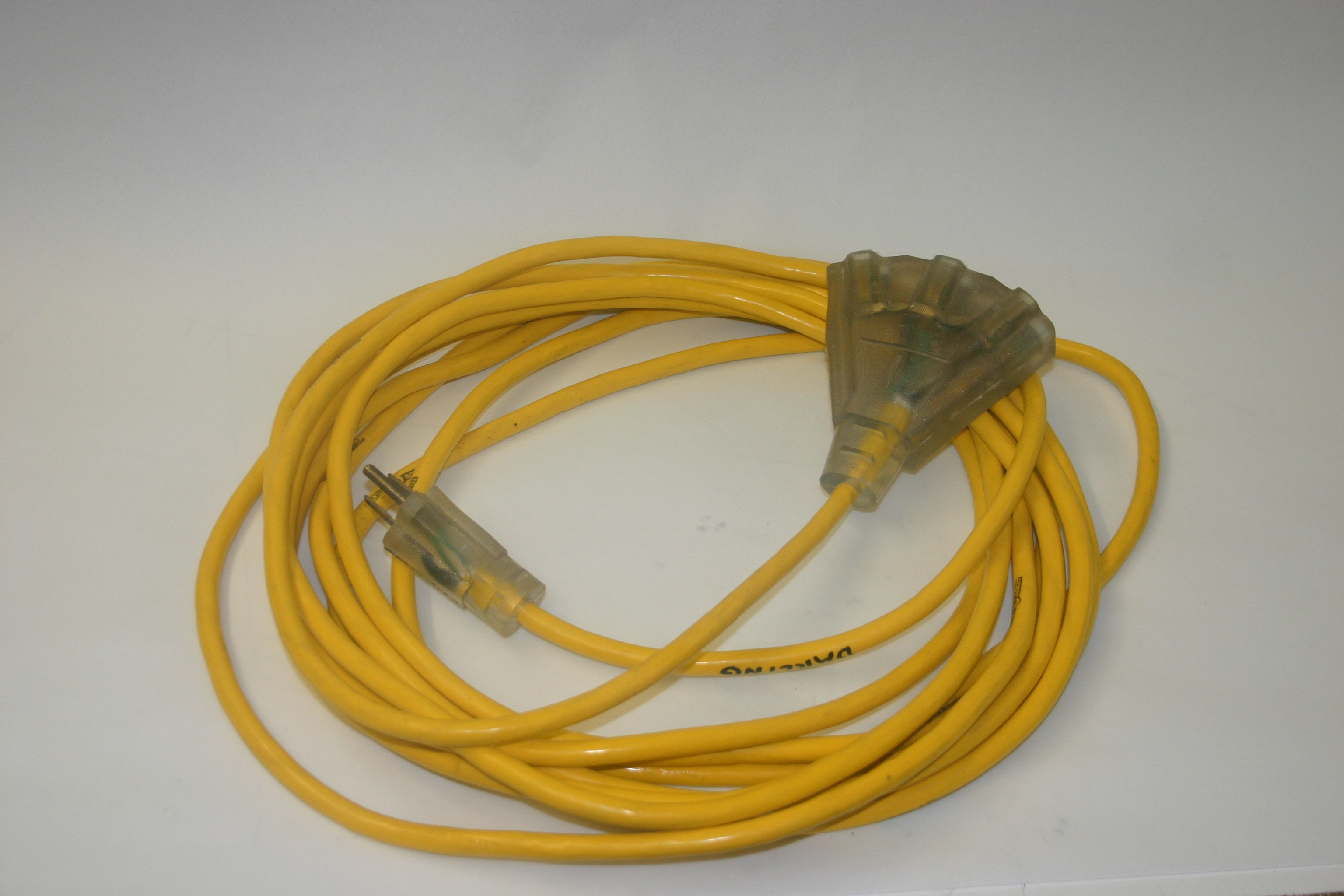
Electrical extension cords are typically made using portable cord rated for the task

A portable cord (also known as portable cordage, flexible cord, or extension cord) is a cable with multiple conductors used for temporary electrical power connections requiring flexibility. The cord can be employed in a range of applications, such as operating motors in small and large tools, equipment, power extensions, home appliances, and machinery.

== Description ==
Portable cords may be used in commercial, industrial and residential applications. Some are used on job sites where resistance to oil, chemicals, and abrasion is essential in extreme environments – both the heat and the cold, outside or inside. Additionally, some portable cords can be water-resistant or water-submersible. Portable cords are commonly used in a range of facilities, such as construction sites, mills, mines, sports complexes, or even marinas.

Although the construction of a portable cord varies depending on the type, a standard cord has at least two stranded copper conductors sized between #18 and #2 American wire gauge (AWG). The copper stranding, insulation, and outer jacket directly influence the physical properties of the cord and its permitted uses.

== Types ==
A variety of portable cords, differing in styles, lengths, and thicknesses exists in the marketplace. Common types include Type SJT, SVT, SEOW, SJ, SJOW, SJOOW, SO, and SOW, each designed for specific applications.

A portable cord is usually made of thermoset polymer, thermoplastic elastomer, or thermoplastic. Thermoset cords have heavy-duty-grade rubber jackets, are extremely sturdy and oil-resistant, and may remain flexible over a temperature range of −40 to 220 °F (−40 to 104 °C). Thermoplastic elastomer (TPE) cords have medium-duty thermoplastic elastomer jackets and perform well in cold conditions down to −50 °F (−46 °C). Thermoplastic cords typically have an extruded plastic PVC jacket, and are intended for light-duty use, typically in a temperature range of −4 to 140 °F (−20 to 60 °C).

== Letter codes ==
In the United States, letter codes have been defined by Underwriters Labs (UL) to describe various attributes and ratings of portable cords. The Canadian Standards Association (CSA) also has defined similar letter codes, and ongoing standards harmonization should eventually resolve minor differences.

=== Common Examples ===
- SPT-1 = Service Parallel Thermoplastic, 0.030" Insulation | 18 AWG | 2 or 3 conductors | PVC Insulation | No Jacket | 300 V AC | Indoor Use Only
- SPT-2 = Service Parallel Thermoplastic, 0.045" Insulation | 18-16 AWG | 2 or 3 conductors | PVC Insulation | No Jacket | 300 V AC | Indoor Use Only
- SPT-3 = Service Parallel Thermoplastic, 0.060" Insulation | 18-10 AWG | 2 or 3 conductors | PVC Insulation | No Jacket | 300 V AC | Indoor Use Only
- SVT = Service Vacuum Thermoplastic | 18 or 17 AWG | 2 or 3 conductors | PVC Insulation | PVC Jacket | 300 V AC | Light Usage Indoors
- SJT = Service Junior Thermoplastic | 18-10 AWG | 2, 3 or 4 conductors | PVC Insulation | PVC Jacket | 300 V AC | Hard Usage Indoors
- SJTW = SJT, Weather-Resistant | 18-10 AWG | 2, 3 or 4 conductors | PVC Insulation | PVC Jacket | 300 V AC | Hard Usage Outdoors
- SJTO = SJT, Oil-Resistant Jacket | 18-10 AWG | 2, 3 or 4 conductors | PVC Insulation | PVC Jacket | 300 V AC | Hard Usage Indoors
- SJTOW = SJT, Oil- & Weather-Resistant Jacket | 18-10 AWG | 2, 3 or 4 conductors | PVC Insulation | PVC Jacket | 300 V AC | Hard Usage Outdoors
- SJTOOW = SJT, Oil-Resistant Insulation, Oil- & Weather-Resistant Jacket | 18-10 AWG | 2, 3 or 4 conductors | PVC Insulation | PVC Jacket | 300 V AC | Extra Hard Usage Outdoors
- S = Service | 18-2 AWG | 2 or more conductors | Rubber Insulation | Rubber Jacket | 600 V AC | Extra Hard Usage Indoors
- SO = Service, Oil-Resistant Jacket | 18-2 AWG | 2 or more conductors | Rubber Insulation | Neoprene Jacket | 600 V AC | Extra Hard Usage Indoors
- SOO = Service, Oil-Resistant Insulation & Jacket | 18-2 AWG | 2 or more conductors | Rubber Insulation | Neoprene Jacket | 600 V AC | Extra Hard Usage Indoors
- SOOW = Service, Oil-Resistant Insulation & Jacket, Weather-Resistant | 18-2 AWG | 2 or more conductors | Rubber Insulation | Neoprene Jacket | 600 V AC | Extra Hard Usage Outdoors
- ST = Service Thermoplastic | 18-2 AWG | 2 or more conductors | PVC Insulation | PVC Jacket | 600 V AC | Extra Hard Usage Indoors
- STW = ST, Weather-Resistant Jacket | 18-2 AWG | 2 or more conductors | PVC Insulation | PVC Jacket | 600 V AC | Extra Hard Usage Outdoors
- STO = ST, Oil-Resistant Jacket | 18-2 AWG | 2 or more conductors | PVC Insulation | PVC Jacket | 600 V AC | Extra Hard Usage Indoors
- SRDT = Service Round Dry Thermoplastic (flat or round) | 10-6 AWG | 3 or 4 conductors | PVC Insulation | PVC Jacket | 600 V AC | Electric Range and Dryer Cords
- W = Power Supply Cable | 8-4/0 AWG | 2, 3, 4 or 5 conductors | EPDM Insulation | Super Vu-Tron Jacket | 2,000 V AC | Extra Hard Usage Outdoors

=== Key ===
- S = Severe Service Cord – 600 volts (also 277/480 or 480) – May be utilized in place of SJ or SV in extra-severe service
- SJ = Junior Severe Service – 300 volts (also 120 or 120/208 or 120/240 or 240 or 277, but not 277/480)
- T = Tinsel Cord (only if first letter of code for a portable cord)
- E = Elastomer (flexible thermoplastic that looks and feels like rubber)
- H = Heat Resistant
- HH = High Heat Resistant
- N = Nylon Outer Jacket Material
- O = Oil-Resistant Outer Jacket
- OO = Oil-Resistant Outer Jacket and Oil-Resistant Interior Insulation
- P = Parallel Cord (conductors are not twisted around each other)
- T = Thermoplastic (if not first letter of code)
- V = Vacuum Cord – 300 volts (typically used with vacuum cleaners and other portable cleaning equipment)
- W = Weather Resistant (UL approved for indoor and outdoor use)
- W = Weather and Water Resistant (CSA approved for indoor and outdoor use)

== See also ==
- Power cable
- Electrical wiring
- 10603
