= Cable grommet =

Tube or ring through which an electrical cable passes

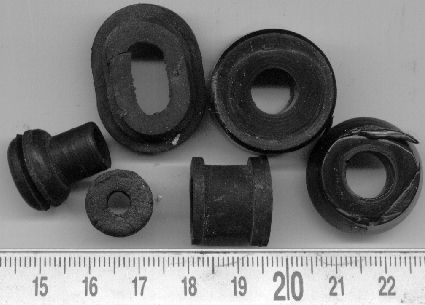
Cable grommets

A cable grommet is a tube or ring through which an electrical cable passes. They are usually made of rubber or metal.

The grommet is usually inserted in holes in certain materials in order to protect, improve friction or seal cables passing through it, from a possible mechanical or chemical attack.

== Grommets used as wire managers for furniture ==
A grommet can be used in furniture to protect wires, cables or cords for computer equipment or other electronic equipment in homes or offices. At the same time, they are used decoratively to embellish the furniture and can be bought in a large variety of sizes, colors and finishes.

The grommets usually consist of two pieces: A liner that goes into the hole of the furniture and a cap with a hole (often adjustable in size) for the cables to go through.

When there is no need to use them they can be blanked either by turning one piece 90° against the other or by inserting an extra plastic piece designed to fit that purpose.

== Rubber grommets "anti-microphonism" ==
A rubber grommet is made of a resilient material (typically rubber), with the molding designed to hold it in place, so as to help to absorb vibrations, for example, between a tandem radio and the chassis or between microphone and its tripod, keeping the two components "floating" mechanically decoupled one from another to prevent a characteristic coupling called microphonism.

== See also ==
- Cable entry system
- Cable gland
