= Feedthrough =

Electrical conductor

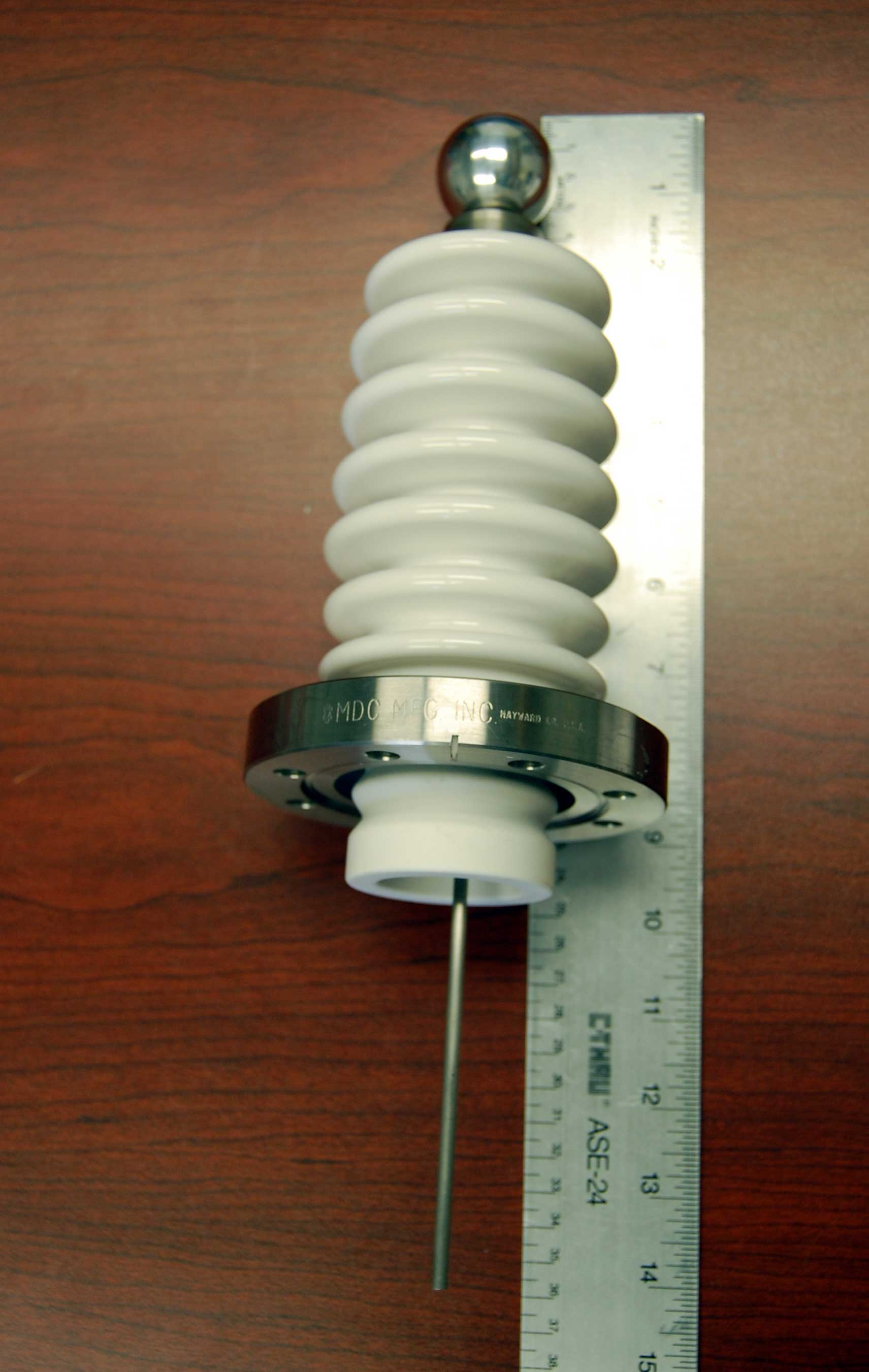
60 kV vacuum feedthrough on a conflat flange

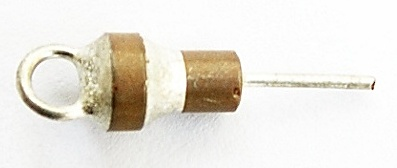
Ceramic feedthrough capacitor with cable lug and a capacitance of 1 nF.

A feedthrough is a conductor used to carry a signal through an enclosure or printed circuit board. Like any conductor, it has a small amount of capacitance. A "feedthrough capacitor" has a guaranteed minimum value of shunt capacitance built in it and is used for bypass purposes in ultra-high-frequency applications. Feedthroughs can be divided into power and instrumentation categories. Power feedthroughs are used to carry either high current or high voltage. Instrumentation feedthroughs are used to carry electrical signals (including thermocouples) which are normally low current or voltage. Another special type is what is commonly known as RF-feedthrough, specifically designed to carry very high frequency RF or microwave electrical signals.

A feedthrough electrical connection may have to withstand considerable pressure difference across its length. Systems that operate under high vacuum, such as electron microscopes, require electrical connections through the pressure vessel. Similarly, submersible vehicles require feedthrough connections between exterior instruments and devices and the controls within the vehicle pressure hull. A very common example of a feedthrough connection is an automobile spark plug where the body of the plug must resist the pressure and temperature produced in the engine, while providing a reliable electrical connection to the spark gap in the combustion chamber. (Spark plugs are occasionally used as low-cost or improvised feedthrough connections in non-engine applications.)

There are electrical hermetically sealed feedthroughs for instrumentation, high amperage and voltage, coaxial, thermocouple and fiber optics. Rotary or mechanical feedthroughs also exist.

== See also ==
- Vacuum technology
