= Home wiring =

Electrical wiring for houses

Home wiring is the application of electrical wiring for houses. It includes wiring for lighting and power distribution, permanently installed and portable appliances, telephone systems, heating or ventilation system control, and increasingly, for home theatre and computer networks.

Safety regulations for wiring installation vary widely around the world, with national, regional, and municipal rules sometimes in effect. Some places allow homeowners to install some or all of the wiring in a home; other jurisdictions require electrical wiring to be installed by licensed electricians only.

== Typical features ==
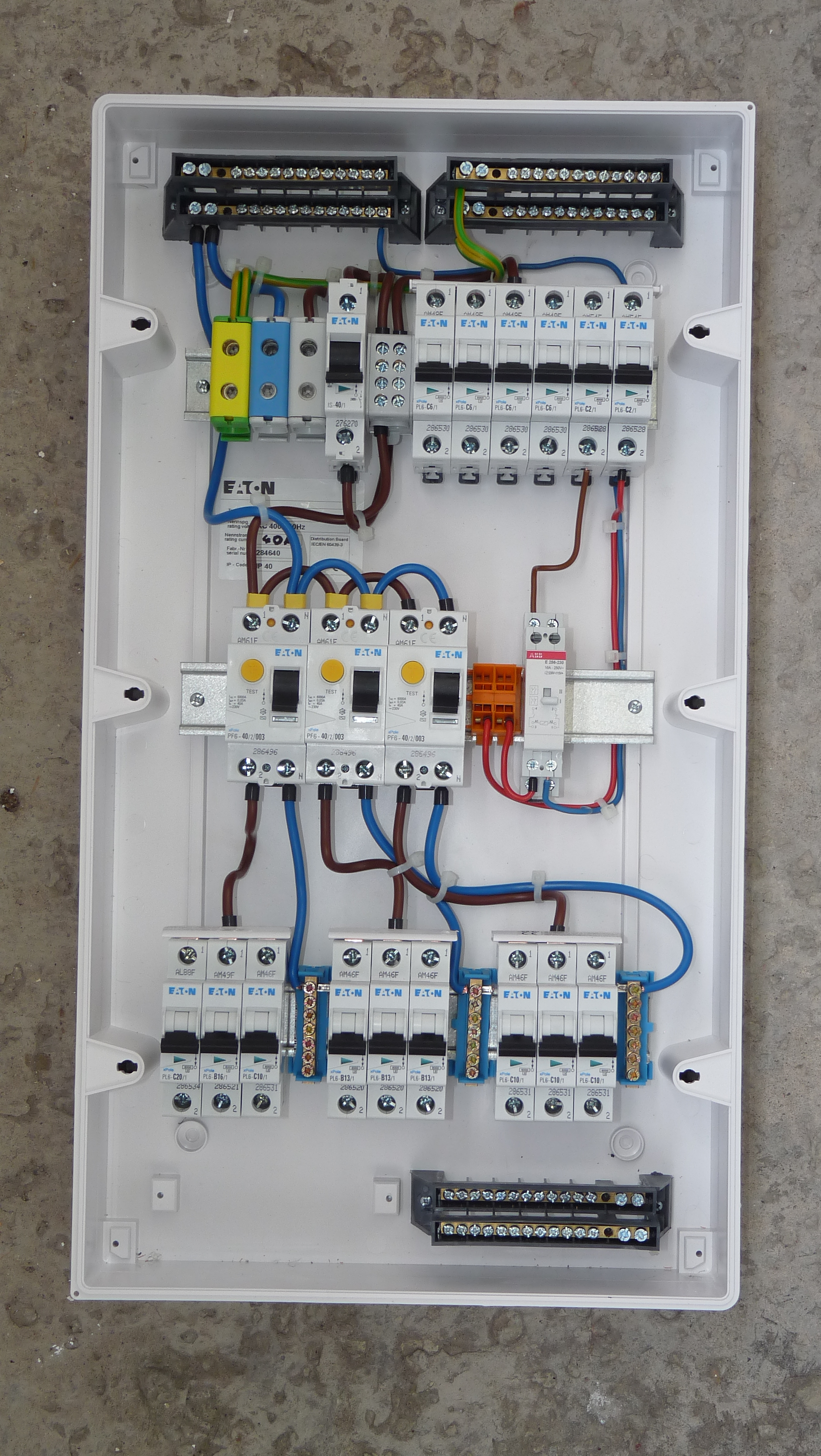
Single-phase ~230 V/40 A/9 kW fuse box for apartment rewiring. Each appliance and each room are highlighted into autonomous circuits - this apartment has 14 individual circuits. A relay is used to control the light fixtures in a large room.

In new home construction, wiring for all electrical services can be installed before the walls are finished. In existing buildings, installing a new system, such as a security system or home theater, may require additional effort to install concealed wiring. Multiple-unit dwellings, such as condominiums and apartment houses, may have added complexity in distributing services within the building.

Common services include:

- Power points (wall outlets)
- Light fixtures and switches
- Telephone
- Internet
- Television, either broadcast, cable, or satellite
- High-end features might include:
- Home theater
- Distributed audio
- Security monitoring
- Security CCTV
- Automation
- Energy management
- Power and telecommunication services

- Generally requires entry points into the home and a location for connection equipment. For electric power supply, a cable is run either overhead or underground into a distribution board in the home. A distribution board, or circuit breaker panel, is typically a metal box mounted on a wall of the home. In many new homes, the electrical switchboard is located on the outside of the external wall of the garage.

- How services are connected will vary depending on the service provider and location of the home.
- The following home services are supported by discrete wiring systems:
- Information and communications
- Entertainment
- Energy management
- Security and safety
- Digital home health
- Aged and assisted living
- Intelligent lighting and power

In new home construction, wiring for all electrical services can be installed before the walls are finished. In existing buildings, installation of a new system, such as a security system or home theater, may require additional effort to install concealed wiring. Multiple-unit dwellings such as condominiums and apartment houses may have additional installation complexity in distributing services within a house.

Services commonly found include:

- Power points (wall outlets)
- Light fixtures and switches
- Telephone
- Internet
- Television, either broadcast, cable, or satellite

High-end features might include:

- Home theater
- Distributed audio
- Security monitoring
- Security CCTV
- Automation
- Energy management

Power and telecommunication services generally require entry points into the home and a location for connection equipment. For electric power supply, a cable is run either overhead or underground into a distribution board in the home. A distribution board, or circuit breaker panel, is typically a metal box mounted on a wall of the home. In many new homes, the location of the electrical switchboard is on the outside of the external wall of the garage.

How services are connected will vary depending on the service provider and location of the home.

The following home services are supported by discrete wiring systems:

1. Information and communications
2. Entertainment
3. Energy management
4. Security and safety
5. Digital home health
6. Aged and assisted living
7. Intelligent lighting and power

== Elements ==
=== Power point ===
Power points (receptacles, plugs, wall sockets) need to be installed throughout the house in locations where power will be required. In many areas the installation must be done in compliance with standards and by a licensed or qualified electrician. Power points are typically located where there will be an appliance installed such as telephone, computers, television, home theater, security system, or CCTV system.

=== Light fittings and switches ===
The number of light fitting does depend on the type of light fitting and the lighting requirements in each room. The incandescent light bulb made household lighting practical, but modern homes use a wide variety of light sources to provide desired light levels with higher energy efficiency than incandescent lamps. A lighting designer can provide specific recommendations for lighting in a home. The layout of lighting in the home must consider control of lighting since this affects the wiring. For example, multiway switching is useful for corridors and stairwells so that a light can be turned on and off from two locations. Outdoor yard lighting, and lighting for outbuildings such as garages may use switches inside the home.

=== Telephone ===
Telephone wiring is required between the telephone company's service entrance and locations throughout the home. Often a home will have telephone outlets in the kitchen, study, living room or bedrooms for convenience. Telephone company regulations may limit the total number of telephones that can be in use at one time. The telephone cabling typically uses two pair twisted cable terminated onto a telephone plug. The cabling is typically installed as a daisy chain starting from the point where the telephone company connects to the home or outlets may each be wired back to the entrance.

=== Data ===
Data wiring has two components:

1. Data service delivery
2. Data network cable

The three most common ways data services are delivered to the home are:

1. ADSL service on the back of the telephone cabling
2. Cable Modem
3. Fiber Optic

==== ADSL service ====
ADSL services are typically delivered using telephone cabling. An ADSL modem needs a filter to segregate voice handsets from the ADSL modem.

==== Cable modem ====
Cable modems are typically installed in location where there is an existing Pay TV service outlet. The installation requires the installation of a Pay TV outlet (F connector).

==== Fiber optic ====
A cable composed of glass fiber optic strands connects from the main service cables along a street to the subscribers house, and terminates on what is known as an Optical Network Termination unit (ONT). The ONT has a data port where cabling from the street connects to a point on the house, and these individual cables are typically installed by the service provider.

In all three cases, the equipment supplied by the Internet provider will have a connection to the computers installed in the building. This is the data network cabling or LAN cabling.

If more than one computer or device (PC, printers, TV etc.) is to be connected in the home, LAN cabling will be required. The cabling used for data networking is similar to the phone cabling as it is twisted pair but of a much higher quality. The cable is known as Category (Cat) 5 or Cat 6. The cabling must be installed as a star wired configuration, that is the cabling runs from the point next to the modem, hub, or router uninterrupted up to the outlet next to the device that needs to be connected. Computer network wiring cannot be chained from one outlet to the next; each outlet is wired individually back to the hub or router next to the modem. If only one computer is required, it can be directly plugged into the modem. An alternative to a wired LAN especially useful for mobile devices is a wireless LAN, which can reduce or eliminate all the fixed wiring.

=== Television ===
Cabling for free to air TV requires the following:

1. An antenna
2. Coaxial cable
3. TV outlets

Antenna types vary depending on location; an urban area with nearby transmitters will require a smaller antenna than a rural site with distant stations. The antenna is often mounted outdoors on the roof or a tower. A coaxial or twin-lead cable is run from the antenna to the location where the television is located. One common type of cable is designated RG-6 Tri-shield or quad-shield cable. The cable is terminated on a television outlets, typically an F connector mounted on a face plate. If there are multiple outlets, an RF splitter is used to divide the signal among them; outlets on the splitter are connected to television outlets at each location (living room, rec room, bedrooms, den, for example). RF splitters come with different types; some include amplifiers for multiple outlets.

Whilst most TV outlets use the F connector the Television or digital set top box usually come with a connector known as Belling Lee so the cable used to connect from the TV outlet to the television will need to have an F connector in one end and a Belling Lee connector at the other end.

The distribution of pay TV through the home uses the same type of cabling used for Free to Air TV with some variations. The variations are:

1. There is no antenna as there is either a satellite dish or a cable from the street.
2. The cabling must be RG-6 quad shield.
3. You may be required to use the cable and cabling connectors approved by your pay TV provider
4. A Pay TV Set Top Box needs to be installed at each television where you want to have access to Pay TV services.

In most cases the pay TV company will supply and install the satellite dish or cable from the street and the cabling to the TV set. In many cases Pay TV services also require a telephone point to access movies on demand.

IPTV is television delivered to the home over the Internet. Any device for viewing IPTV must have an internet connection. This may be a wired connection, or wireless.

=== Home theater ===
Home theater pre-wiring requires knowledge of the number of speakers to be installed.

1. Two front speakers; one on the left of the screen and one on the right of the screen,
2. One front speaker cable just above or below the screen which is the middle front
3. Two rear speakers; one on the left and one of the right in line with front left and right speaker locations
4. The sub-woofer which can be anywhere in the room acoustically but must be relatively close to the active equipment the amplifier or surround sound receiver.

The speaker cable is figure eight multi-strand copper cable. Cabling for the sub-woofer is typically a single shielded cable terminated on an RCA connector. A 7.1 channel system also needs cable for speakers that are installed between the front and back speakers.

The simplest layout for a home theater system is a single piece of furniture containing all one's AV equipment, which simplifies wiring. If, on the other hand, a front projection unit is to be employed, more thought must be given to the layout of the system. Several different cabling systems are commonly used for this application, including HDMI, DVI, and VGA.

=== Distributed audio ===
Distributed audio provides music throughout the house, where the music sources are all centralized. Rooms are provided with speakers and controls to adjust volume or music source. A system may have central controls or allow for off-site control.

=== Security monitoring ===
Security monitoring (burglar alarm) systems contain the following basic components:

1. Keypad
2. Siren and strobe light
3. Motion detectors
4. Glass-Break Detectors
5. Door Contacts
6. Main Control Panel
7. IP / Cellular Communicator

and may have additional components.

==== Keypad ====
The Keypad is typically found inside the front door or any other access door. The keypad is used to alarm the system on departure and disarm the system on entry. The cabling required is typically 22/4 multi strand copper cable.

==== Siren and strobe light ====
The siren and strobe light are typically installed outside the front of the house where it can be seen from the street and is protected from the weather. The cabling required is a 6 core multi strand copper cable.

==== Motion detectors ====
The motion detectors installed in locations throughout the house where any intrusion into the home can be detected. The best way to think of this is which are the rooms that have direct access from the outside, where can I place a detector to pick up any intrusion. One solution is to place a motion sensor in each room, as this can be expensive an alternative is to place one immediately outside in the common corridor to all rooms. The cabling required is a 6 core multi strand copper cable.

==== Main equipment ====
The main equipment is typically installed in a location that is not easily accessible such as a cupboard or sub floor area where in the event of an intrusion the person(s) cannot easily find it and interfere with the unit. The main unit requires a power point installed next to it for main power. It also needs a connection to the telephone line servicing the home so in situations where a back-to-base service is required it can be connected to the phone line. For details on the telephone connection see the section titled "telephone" in this article. Note the connection of the security system to the phone line requires a wiring configuration that allows the security system to disconnect all phones in the home when it needs to connect to the monitoring center. This is critical, if the wiring is not correct the system may not communicate back to base when an intrusion is detected.

All cabling from the code pad, siren and strobe light and motion detectors needs to be run out from the main equipment. It is also recommended that the cabling to each code pad, motion detector are individual runs from the main equipment to the device. By having each device individually connected to the main equipment is facilitates maintenance and allows for more effective monitoring.

==== Cabling for IP Based systems ====
Like the traditional equipment the IP based systems require as a minimum

1. Code pad
2. Siren and strobe light
3. Motion detectors
4. Main equipment

The difference here is the cabling to connect the main equipment is either Cat 5 or Cat 6 and it is installed as part of the data cabling of the home. See this article the section titled "Data network cabling"

=== Security CCTV ===
This is becoming more sought after in private home as an additional level of security. The wiring required to install a CCTV system is Data cabling, refer to the section in this article titled "Data network cabling". What you need to determine is where do you want to install the CCTV cameras and wherever you want the camera you need to install a data outlet. The location where you install the cameras will vary from home to home but typically they are installed so you can see anyone approaching any of the entry areas of the home.

The advantage of an IP bases system is the flexibility to add devices at a later stage. That is you can cable to as many locations as you want and have it terminate on a data outlet near where you may be planning to add devices at a later stage. Adding the device is as simple as plugging it into the outlet and configuring the device.

=== Automation ===
Automation refers to the ability to be able to control a range of devices in the home ranging from lights to curtains. The most common example of automation are referred to as Lighting control systems. Lighting control system need to be installed by a qualified professional as the cabling is only one element but without the equipment and programming you cannot even turn a light on. The cabling required when installing an automation system can be divided into two parts:

1. Electrical
2. Data Bus

==== Electrical ====
This is cabling installed from the electrical switchboard to the light fitting or any other device that is to be controlled by the automation system. For example, if you have four down lights in a room and you wish to control each light individually, then each light will be wired back using electrical cabling back to the electrical switchboard. This means you will have four electrical cables installed from the electrical switchboard to the location where the light fittings will be installed. Each cable will be a three core active, neutral and earth cable.

If in that room you also have a free standing lamp plugged into a power point and you also want to control this from your automation system, you will need to have that power point individually wired back to the electrical switchboard.

So if you want to individually control every light fitting and every power point or power outlets then each one of these devices must be individually wired back to the electrical switchboard. As you can see this start to become quite a lot of electrical cabling so planning is essential.

Note, when you are using an automation system, there is no need to install any electrical cabling to the light switches. In a traditional electrical installation without automation the lights in a room would be wired back to the light switch which in turn would be wired back to the switchboard or some similar arrangement, so keep reading.

==== Data bus ====
Once you have installed the electrical cabling you need to install the data bus cable from the electrical switchboard to every location you want to have a light switch or control panel installed (control panel is like the code pad on a security system or touch screen that gives you access to various control functions). The most common cable used for this is a Category 5 cable. The cable can be installed in either a daisy chain or star wired configuration. The importance is to minimize the cable length to avoid a communications problem on the bus.

=== Energy management ===
Energy management is a new and upcoming topic at homes. Older systems tended to be cable; however, all new systems use one of a variety of wireless solutions. This enables them to be effectively retrofitted into existing homes with minimum disruption.

If a cabled system is selected, cabling needs to be deployed to the major appliances in the home. The cabling is installed as part of the data cabling as per detailed in this article in the section titled "Data Network Cabling". In addition to a cable being installed to every major appliance, you also need to install a data cable near the electricity meter.

The major appliances being considered at this stage are:

1. Electrical hot water system
2. Air Conditioning
3. Pool pump
4. Fridge / freezer
5. Electric vehicle charger
6. Battery energy storage systems (BESS)

Should a wireless system be selected the need for such disruption is removed. Smart plugs or switches can be used to connect the major appliances to the electricity supply and the home energy management system will wirelessly control them.

== See also ==
- Electrical wiring
- Home automation
