= Cable entry system =

A cable entry system is an assembly where one or more cables or pipes can be routed through. Common uses include the routing of electrical cables, corrugated conduits, pneumatic and hydraulic hoses, into switch cabinets, electrical enclosures, machines and vehicles. Possible requirements can be high ingress protection rates or integrated strain relief.

It is being differentiated between entry systems for routeing standard cables (without connectors) with a high packing density and split cable entry systems which enable routeing of pre-terminated cables (with connectors) or complete cable harnesses.

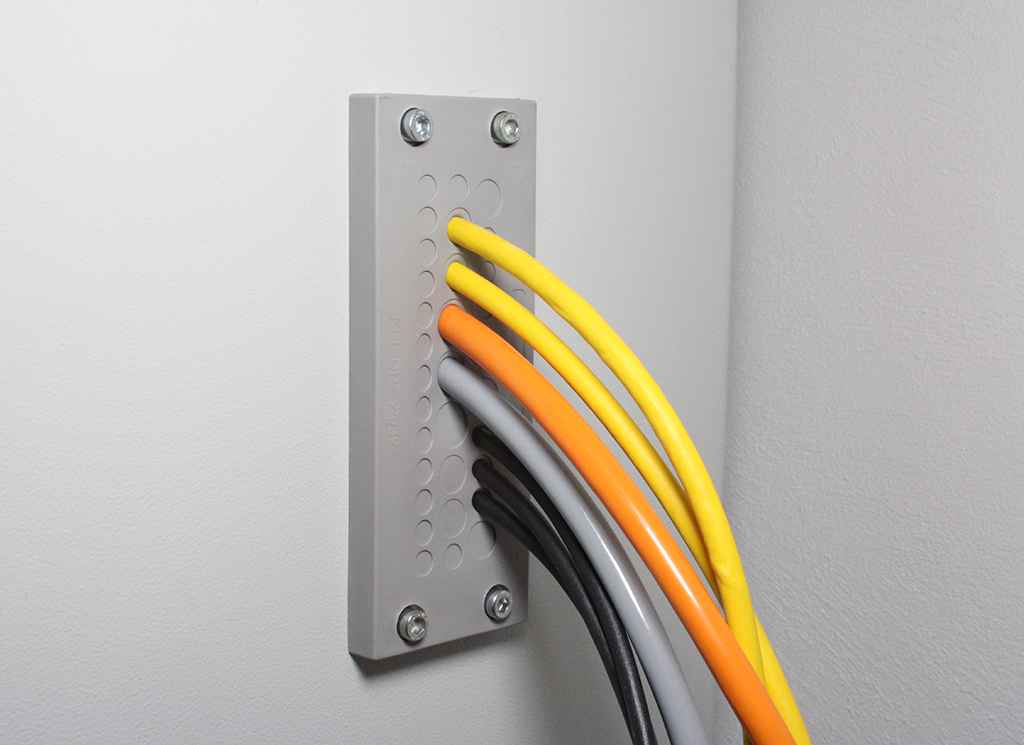
Gland plate for cables without connectors, up to IP 68 rated protection

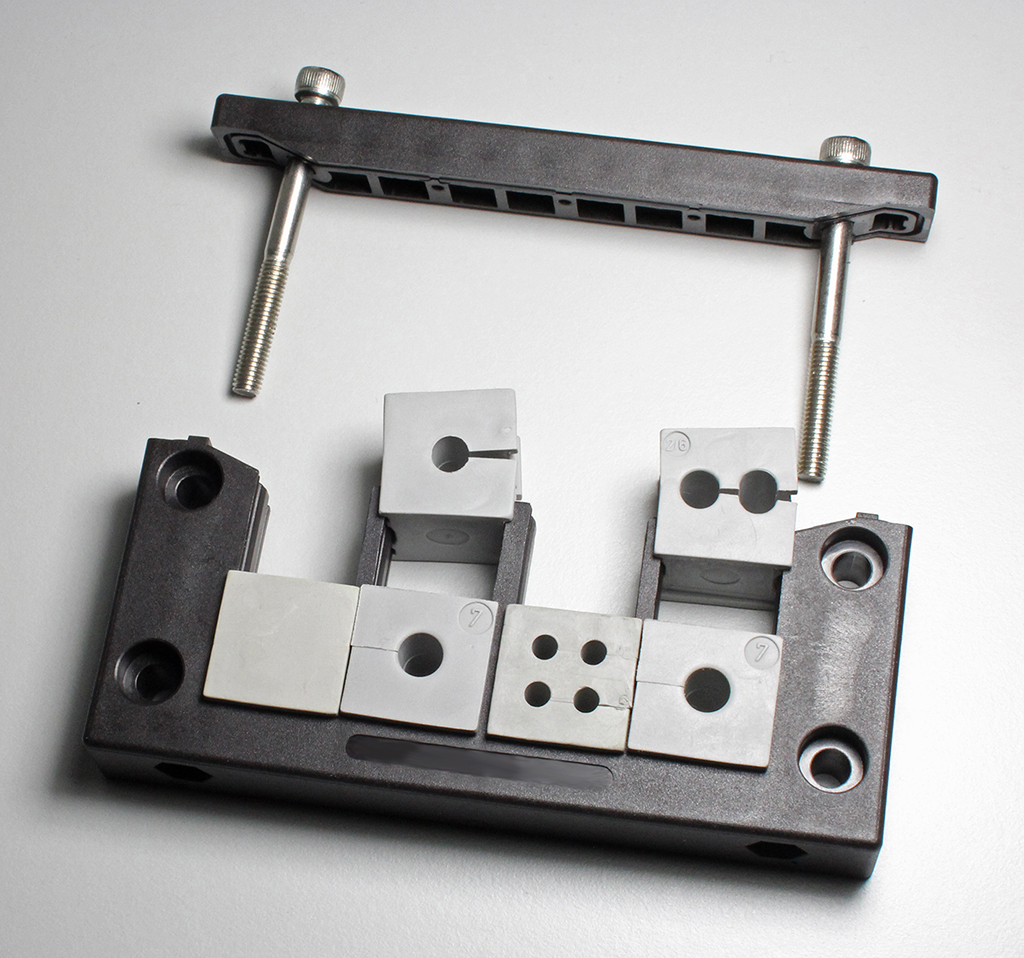
Split cable entry for multiple pre-terminated cables, up to IP 66 rated protection

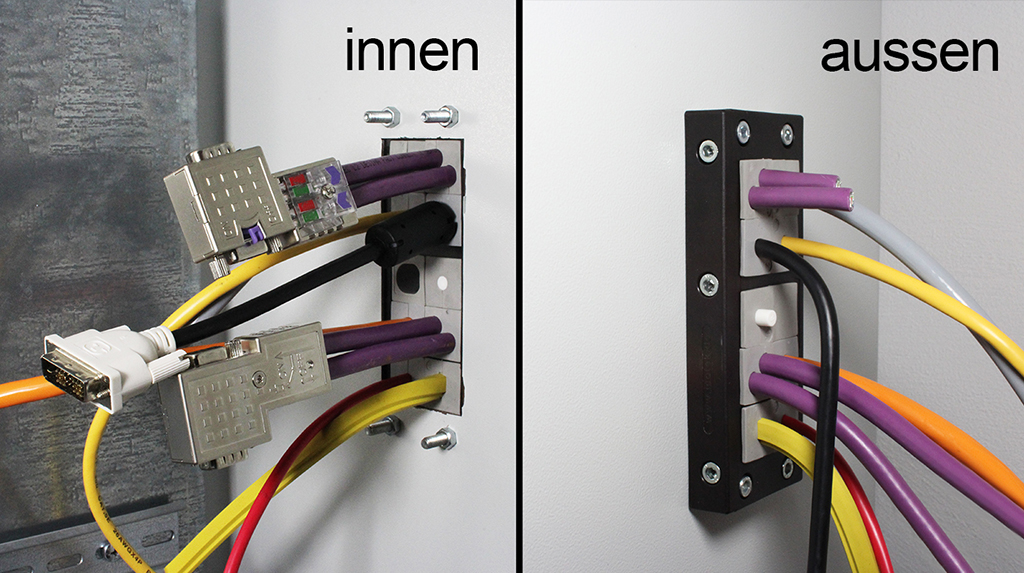
Mounted cable entry on a switch cabinet wall

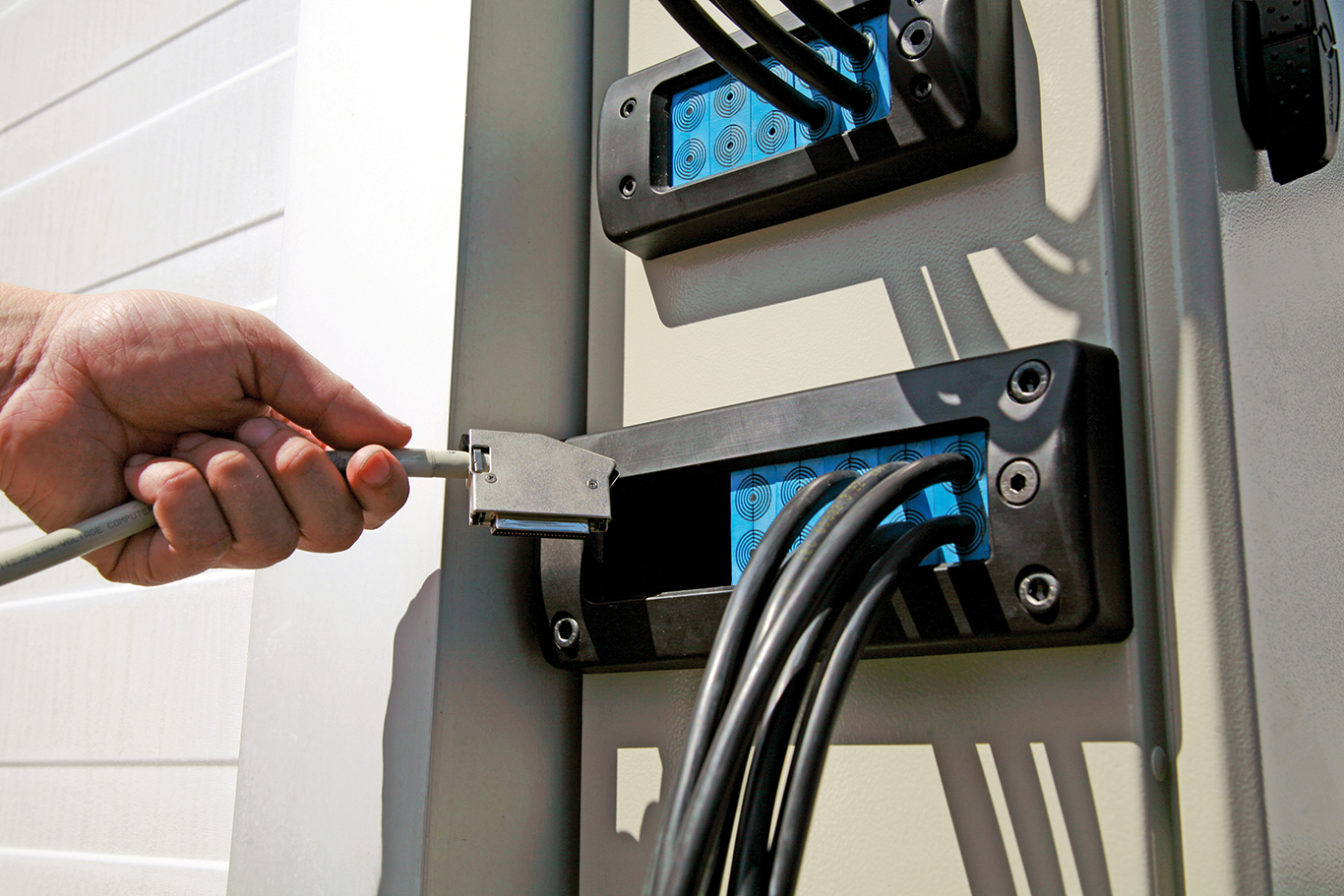
Multi-layer sealing module solution for pre-terminated cables

== History ==
From the 1950s on, machines and switch cabinets were more and more wired by using heavy-duty industrial connectors, but the increasing cost pressure forced engineers to look for more cost-effective solutions and to decrease the risk of miswiring. In the 1990s, cable entry systems have been developed as an alternative to heavy-duty industrial connectors and cable glands.

== Cable entry systems for cables without connectors ==
For routing of standard cables and other electrical, pneumatic or hydraulic lines through machine, panel or enclosure walls, cable glands, self-sealing grommets or gland plates can be used to seal the cut-outs required for passing the cables through. This protects the inside of an enclosure or machine from dirt, dust or liquids. Cable glands and self-sealing grommets are usually designed for entering single or just a few cables. By utilising a gland plate, many cables with different diameters can be routed. Depending on the type, very high cable densities or ingress protection classes up to IP66/IP68 (according to IEC 60529) can be achieved.

Even for industries with hygiene critical environments (for example, food industry, pharmaceutical industry) membrane-based cable entry plates are available in the market as alternatives to hygienic stainless steel cable glands. These cable entry plates are characterised by a particularly smooth surface without dirt collecting recesses (EHEDG compliant Hygienic Design) and FDA compliant material.

== Split cable entry systems for cables with connectors ==
For routing cables which are already assembled with connectors, split cable entry systems have been developed. The divisibility of these systems provides two advantages. The warranty on pre-terminated cables remains since the connectors don’t have to be cut and soldered again after entering the cables. The other advantage is that assembly can be done subsequently because the split cable entries are usually built around the existing lines.

Most split cable entries consist of a split hard frame, made of plastic or sometimes stainless steel (e.g. utilised in food industry) and one or several split sealing grommets, usually made of elastomer. The grommet matching the cable diameter is placed around the cable and fixed inside the cable entry frame. Thus allowing strain relief for the cables (in some cases according to EN 62444) as well as ingress protection of up to IP66/IP68.

== Frame sizes and standards ==
Cable entries are offered in different sizes, but most of them are based on cut-out dimensions and drilling templates for standard industrial connectors (10-pin, 16-pin, 24-pin). Round cable entry plates are usually produced in metric standard sizes (M16 – M63)

Since cable entry systems are utilised in many different applications, it is very important to comply with standards like e.g. IP rating (according to EN 60529), UL recognition, DNV-GL listing (for marine applications), national or European railway standards or ATEX certifications that enable use in potentially explosive atmospheres.

== See also ==
- Ring main unit
