= 10603 wire =

Type of electrical wire

10603 wire is an electrical hook up wire that meets military specifications. The wire has come into high demand in recent years because of its exceptional features and widespread usability.

10603 wire is an HTXE military wire and meets Army Drawing 12293251. The hook up wire is a special purpose wire with double insulation. The wire is often used in ground vehicles and meets U.S. Army requirements for armored vehicles. 10603 wire has good fuel and oil resistance.

Often requested parts include 10603-10, 10603-8, 10603-4, 10603-2, 10603-1, 10603-0 and 10603-00.

Colors and color code designators for 10603 hook up wire will usually be in accordance with MIL-STD-681, a standard that sets up identification coding systems for insulated hook up wire used in electrical equipment by the Departments of the Army, Navy and Air Force.
