= Earth-leakage circuit breaker =

Electrical safety device

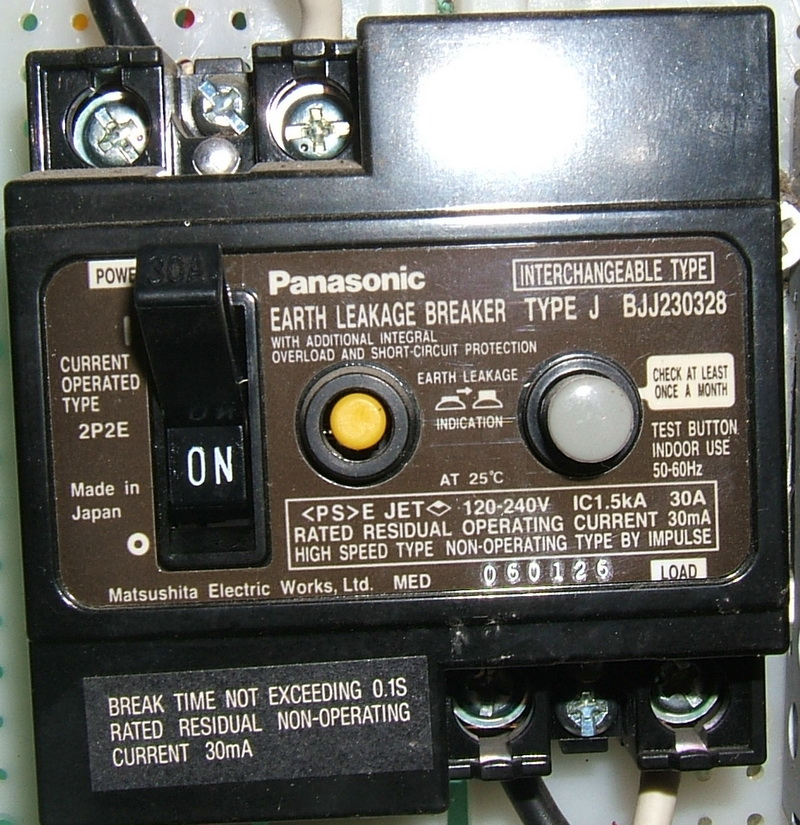

An earth-leakage circuit breaker (ELCB) is a safety device used in electrical installations to prevent shock. It consists of either a current sensing mechanism, or a voltage sensing mechanism. Such a protection mechanism may be found in the form of distribution board modules, standalone devices, and special sockets (also called receptacles).

Voltage-operated ELCBs can still be found in the wild, though these largely fell out of favour after the invention of the current-sensing based RCD (GFCI), technology.

== History ==
Early ELCBs, first introduced about sixty years ago, were voltage operated devices (VO-ELCBs), detecting a voltage rise between installation metalwork and an external electrode.

These were later replaced by current sensing devices about forty years ago. For some time afterwards both forms were referred to as ELCBs which brought some confusion. To address this the IEC introduced the term residual current device (RCD). Residual current refers to any residue when comparing current in the outbound and return currents in the circuit. In single phase circuits this is simply the line or phase current minus the neutral current. In a 3 phase circuit all current carrying conductors must be sensed.

In modern literature the term ELCB is sometimes incorrectly used to specifically refer to VO-ELCBs, while almost never used to refer to current sensing devices, which are almost exclusively referred to instead by terms such as RCD, RCCB and GFCI.

If the wrong type was used on an installation, insufficient protection may be provided. A voltage operated type can only protect against faults or shocks to metalwork connected the voltage-operated ELCB. It cannot detect current leaving a live wire and running to ground by another path, such as via a person standing on the Earth.

== Operation ==
An ELCB is a specialised type of latching relay that has a building's incoming mains power connected through its switching contacts so that the ELCB disconnects the power when earth leakage is detected.

The ELCB detects fault currents between line and earth (ground) conductors within the portion of the installation it protects. If sufficient characteristics of a fault appear across the ELCB's sensing mechanism, then it will switch off the power, and remain off until manually reset.

=== Voltage-operated devices ===
A voltage-operated ELCB detects a rise in potential between the protected interconnected metalwork (equipment frames, conduits, enclosures) and a distant isolated Earth reference electrode. They operate at a detected potential of around 50 volts to open a main breaker and isolate the supply from the protected premises.

A voltage-operated ELCB has a second terminal for connecting to the remote reference Earth connection.

The Earth circuit is modified when an ELCB is used; the connection to the Earth rod is passed through the ELCB by connecting to its two Earth terminals. One terminal goes to the installation Earth CPC (circuit protective conductor, or Earth wire), and the other to the Earth rod (or sometimes other type of Earth connection).

=== Current sensing devices ===
RCDs exist in multiple sub-types, but the most basic form simply consists of a current transformer, in which the line and neutral conductors for the circuit are wound around a toroidal transformer core, and should there be a current leak between line and earth (ground), bypassing neutral, the imbalance in current flow between the line and neutral will cause a magnetic flux in the core, which then, if strong enough, activates a relay that opens the switch.

== Comparison ==
Advantages of voltage-sensing devices over current-sensing:

- They are less sensitive to fault conditions, and therefore have fewer nuisance trips. (This does not mean they always do, as practical performance depends on installation details and the discrimination enhancing filtering in the devices.) Therefore, by electrically separating cable armour from the cable circuit protective conductor, a devices can be arranged to protect against cable damage only, and not trip on faults in downstream installations.
- Voltage sensing devices will also trip on DC current faults to ground which a transformer interfaced RCD/RCCB is unable to sense, with similar issues with frequencies significantly above mains frequency. This may lead to ground faults on variable speed drives between the drive electronics and motor not being detected for example.

Disadvantages of voltage-sensing devices over current-sensing:

- A wire break in the fault to load section, or in the earth to ground section, will disable operation of the devices.
- Requirement of an additional third wire from the load to the devices.
- Separate devices cannot be grounded individually.
- Any additional connection to Earth on the protected system can disable the detector.
- Additional resistance and an additional point of failure added into the earthing system.
- The devices senses equipment faults and cannot detect if a person accidentally touches an energized part of the devices.

== Earth bypassing ==
It is not unusual for an ELCB protected installation to have a second unintentional connection to Earth somewhere, one that does not pass through the ELCB sense coil. This can occur via metal pipework in contact with the ground, metal structural framework, outdoor home appliances in contact with soil, and so on.

When such a secondary connection is present, fault current may pass to Earth without being sensed by the ELCB. Despite this, perhaps counter-intuitively, the operation of the ELCB is not compromised. The purpose of the ELCB is to prevent Earthed metalwork rising to a dangerous voltage during fault conditions, and the ELCB continues to do this just the same, the ELCB will still cut the power at the same CPC voltage level. (The difference is that higher fault current is then needed to reach this voltage.)

== Nuisance trips ==
While voltage and current on the protective earth conductor is usually fault current from a live wire, this is not always the case, thus there are situations in which an ELCB can nuisance trip.

When an installation has two connections to Earth, a nearby high current lightning strike will cause a voltage gradient in the soil, presenting the ELCB sense coil with enough voltage to cause it to trip.

If the installation's Earth rod is placed close to the Earth rod of a neighbouring building, a high Earth leakage current in the other building can raise the local ground potential and cause a voltage difference across the two Earths, again tripping the ELCB. Close Earth rods are unsuitable for ELCB use for this reason, but in real life such installations are sometimes encountered.

Both RCDs and ELCBs are prone to nuisance trips from normal harmless Earth leakage to some degree. On one hand ELCBs are on average older, and hence tend to have less well developed filtering against nuisance trips, and on the other hand ELCBs are inherently immune to some of the causes of false trips RCDs suffer, and are generally less sensitive than RCDs. In practice RCD nuisance trips are much more common.

Another cause of nuisance tripping is due to accumulated or burden currents caused by items with lowered insulation resistance. This may occur due to older equipment, or equipment with heating elements, or even wiring in buildings in the tropics where prolonged damp and rain conditions can cause the insulation resistance to lower due to moisture tracking. If there is a 30 mA protective device in use and there is a 10 mA burden from various sources then the unit will trip at 20 mA. The individual items may each be electrically safe but a large number of small burden currents accumulates and reduces the tripping level. This was more a problem in past installations where multiple circuits were protected by a single ELCB.

Heating elements of the tubular form are filled with a very fine powder that can absorb moisture if the element has not been used for some time. In the tropics, this may occur, for example if a clothes drier has not been used for a year or a large water boiler used for coffee, etc. has been in storage. In such cases, if the unit is allowed to power up without RCD protection then it will normally dry out and successfully pass inspection. This type of problem can be seen even with brand new equipment.

== Failure to respond ==
Some ELCBs do not respond to rectified fault current. This issue is the same in principle with VO-ELCBs and RCDs, but VO-ELCBs are on average much older and specifications have improved considerably over the years, so an old VO-ELCB is more likely to have some fault current waveform that it will not respond to.

With any mechanical device, failures occur, and ELCBs should ideally be tested periodically to ensure they still work.

If either of the Earth wires become disconnected from the VO-ELCB, it will no longer trip and the installation will often no longer be properly Earthed.

== See also ==
- Residual-current device
- Earthing system
