= FMP =

FMP may refer to:

== Entertainment ==
- For My Pain..., a Finnish gothic metal band
- Fox Movies Premium, an Asian movie channel
- Free Music Production, a German jazz record label
- Full Moon Productions, a defunct American record label
- Full Metal Panic!, a 1998 Japanese light novel, manga and anime series

== Politics ==
- Federal Music Project, a New Deal program of the United States federal government
- Fren Melanesian Party, a political party in Vanuatu
- Fronte Marco Polo, a defunct political party in Italy
- Portuguese Maximalist Federation (Portuguese: Federação Maximalista Portuguesa), a defunct revolutionary movement in Portugal

== Other ==
- Fe'fe' language, spoken in Cameroon
- FileMaker Pro, a cross-platform database application
- Finite model property, in logic
- Fuero Militar Policial, a military and police court in Peru
- Forum of Mathematics, Pi, a mathematical journal
- Freestyle Music Park, in Myrtle Beach, South Carolina, United States
- Full Moon Party, a monthly event on Ko Pha Ngan, Thailand
- KK FMP, an ABA League basketball club based in Belgrade, Serbia
- KK FMP (1991–2011), a defunct Serbian basketball club
- Fault-Managed Power Systems, a method of electrical power distribution
- Final Menstrual Period, menopause
