= Vector group =

Designation of electrical transformer configuration

In electrical engineering, a vector group, officially called a connection symbol, is the International Electrotechnical Commission (IEC) method of categorizing the high voltage (HV) windings and low voltage (LV) winding configurations of three-phase transformers. The vector group designation indicates the windings configurations and the difference in phase angle between them. For example, a star HV winding and delta LV winding with a 30-degree lead is denoted as Yd11.

The phase windings of a polyphase transformer can be connected internally in different configurations, depending on what characteristics are needed from the transformer. In a three-phase power system, it may be necessary to connect a three-wire system to a four-wire system, or vice versa. Because of this, transformers are manufactured with a variety of winding configurations to meet these requirements.

Different combinations of winding connections will result in different phase angles between the voltages on the windings. Transformers connected in parallel must have the same vector group; mismatching phase angles will result in circulating current and other system disturbances.

== Symbol designation ==
The vector group provides a simple way of indicating how the connections of a transformer are arranged. In the system adopted by the IEC, the vector group is indicated by a code consisting of two or three letters, followed by one or two numeric digits. The letters indicate the winding configuration as follows:

- D or d: Delta winding, also called a mesh winding. Each phase terminal connects to two windings, so the windings form a triangular configuration with the terminals on the points of the triangle.
- Y or y: Wye winding, (also called a star). Each phase terminal connects to one end of a winding, and the other end of each winding connects to a common central point, so that the configuration resembles the letter Y. The central point may be connected outside of the transformer to a system neutral.
- Z or z: Zigzag winding, or interconnected star winding. Similar to a wye winding, but two windings from each phase are arranged so that the three legs are "bent" when the phase diagram is drawn. Zigzag-wound transformers have special characteristics and are not commonly used where these characteristics are not needed.
- N (uppercase): indicates that a system neutral is connected to the high-voltage side.
- n (lowercase): indicates that a system neutral is connected to the low-voltage side.

In the IEC vector group code, each letter stands for one set of windings. The high-voltage (HV) winding is designated with an uppercase letter, followed by medium- or low-voltage (LV) windings designated with a lowercase letter. The digits following the letter codes indicate the difference in phase angle between the windings, with HV winding is taken as a reference. The number is in units of 30 degrees. For example, a transformer with a vector group of Dy1 has a delta-connected HV winding and a wye-connected LV winding. The phase angle of the LV winding lags the HV by 30 degrees.

Note that the high-voltage (HV) side always comes before the low-voltage (LV) side, regardless of which is the primary winding. This means that the vector group symbol will always start with a capital letter.

== Phase displacement ==
Phase rotation is always counterclockwise (internationally adopted convention) and indicates multiples of 30 degree lag for low voltage winding using of the high voltage winding as the reference.

Thus 1 = 30°, 2 = 60°, 3 = 90°, 6 = 180° and 12 = 0° or 360°.

According to the IEC60076-1 standard, the notation is HV-LV in sequence. For example, a step-up transformer with a delta-connected primary and a wye-connected secondary is still labeled as 'Yd1'. The 1 indicates the LV winding lags the HV by 30 degrees.

Transformers built to ANSI standards usually do not have the vector group shown on their nameplate and instead a vector diagram is given to show the relationship between the primary and other windings.

- Removing harmonics: Dy connection – D winding nullifies 3rd harmonics, preventing it to be reflected on Wye side.
- Parallel operations: All the transformers should have same phase rotation, vector group, tap setting & polarity of the winding.
- Ground fault Relay: A Dd transformer does not have neutral. To restrict the ground faults in such systems, we may use a zigzag wound transformer to create a neutral along with the ground fault relay.

There is no technical difference between one vector group (i.e. Yd1) or another vector group with same interconnection for the windings (i.e. Yd11) in terms of performance. The only factor affecting the choice between one or the other is system phasing, i.e. whether parts of the network fed from the transformer need to operate in parallel with another source. It also matters if you have an auxiliary transformer connected to generator terminals.

== See also ==
- Single-phase electric power
- Three-phase electric power
