= Earthing system =

Electrical grounding for safety or function

An earthing system (internationally) or grounding system (US) connects specific parts of an electric power system, such as the conductive surfaces of equipment, with the ground for safety and functional purposes. The choice of earthing system can affect the safety and electromagnetic compatibility of the installation. Regulations for earthing systems vary among countries, though most follow the recommendations of the International Electrotechnical Commission (IEC). Regulations may identify special cases for earthing in mines, in patient care areas, or in hazardous areas of industrial plants.

== Purpose ==
=== Protection against Electric Shock ===
System earthing serves as a key component of one of the most commonly used forms of protection against electric shock. International standard IEC 61140 Protection against electric shock sets out requirements for shock protection under both normal conditions (so called basic protection), and fault conditions (i.e. earth faults). Basic protection involves concepts such as insulation. Fault protection (with respect to risk of shock, as opposed to other forms of electrical system faults) concerns the concept of accessible conductive parts within an installation (building) which were never intended to be electrically energised, unintentionally becoming energised and hazardous.

One of the methods described by IEC 61140 for addressing fault protection, and one of the most commonly used, is automatic disconnection of supply (ADS). This involves the use of an earthing system and protective devices (fuses or circuit breakers) which will automatically break circuits when a fault is detected, removing the hazard. Under this method any accessible conductive parts of an installation (including those of Class I appliances) which could develop a fault and become hazardous are connected to an earthing system such that in the event of such a fault developing (due to unintended contact of the part with a live conductor), a circuit is completed, allowing current to flow, and that current flow can cause a protective device to be triggered.

As shown later, only in some earthing system arrangements does the Earth form part of this fault path. In all cases one or more literal connections to Earth are utilised, which acts as a reference point, restricting the degree to which voltage of any part of the earthing system can stray from that of the surrounding ground.

=== Static build-up prevention ===
A connection to Earth prevents the build-up of static electricity, as induced by friction for example, such as when wind blows onto a radio mast.

=== Surge protection ===
Electrical surges can occur due to switching events or lightning strikes and can potentially cause damage to equipment, property, or even pose a threat to life. While in some cases surge protection devices will simply divert surges between electrical conductors, surges will sometimes be diverted to Earth.

=== Functional earthing ===
Functional earthing serves a purpose other than electrical safety. Example purposes include electromagnetic interference (EMI) filtering in an EMI filter, and the use of the Earth as a return path in a single-wire earth return distribution system.

=== Other earthing systems ===
This article only concerns grounding for electrical power. Examples of other earthing systems are:

- As part of a single-wire earth return power and signal lines, such as were used for low wattage power delivery and for telegraph lines.
- In radio, as a ground plane for large monopole antenna.
- As ancillary voltage balance for other kinds of radio antennas, such as dipoles.
- As the feed-point of a ground dipole antenna for VLF and ELF radio.

== Low-voltage systems ==
In low-voltage networks, which distribute the electric power to the widest class of end users, the main concern for the design of earthing systems is the safety of consumers who use the electric appliances and their protection against electric shocks. The earthing system, in combination with protective devices such as fuses and residual current devices, must ultimately ensure that a person does not come into contact with a metallic object whose potential relative to the person's potential exceeds a safe threshold, typically set at about 50 V AC.

Whilst historically there has been considerable national variation, most developed countries introduced 220 V, 230 V, or 240 V AC sockets with earthed contacts either just before or soon after World War II. However, in the United States and Canada, where the supply voltage is only 120 V relative to ground (two opposite-phase 120 V lines are used to provide 240 V), power outlets installed before the mid-1960s generally did not include a ground (earth) pin. In the developing world, local wiring practices may or may not provide a connection to an earth conductor.

On low-voltage electricity networks with a phase-to-neutral voltage exceeding 240 V to 690 V, which are mostly used in industry, mining equipment, and machines rather than publicly accessible networks, the earthing system design is equally important from a safety point of view as for domestic users.

The US National Electrical Code permitted the use of the supply neutral wire as the equipment enclosure connection to ground from 1947 to 1996 for ranges (including separate cooktops and ovens) and from 1953 to 1996 for clothes dryers, whether plug-in or permanently fixed, provided that the circuit originated in the main service panel. Normal imbalances in the circuit would create small equipment voltages with respect to Earth; a failure of the neutral conductor or connections would allow the equipment to go to full 120 volts, an easily lethal situation. The 1996 and newer editions of the NEC no longer permit this practice. For similar reasons, most countries now mandate dedicated protective earth connections in consumer wiring, a practice that has become nearly universal. In distribution networks however, where connections are fewer and less vulnerable, many countries do permit earth and neutral functions to share a conductor (see PEN conductor).

If the fault path between exposed conductive parts and the supply has sufficiently low impedance, then should such a part accidentally become energized, the fault current will cause the circuit overcurrent protection device (fuse or circuit breaker) to open, clearing the fault. However, if the impedance of the fault path is too high, then fault currents may not trip the overcurrent protection device quickly enough to meet the requirements of local electrical regulations. This is often the case with a TT-type earthing system. In such cases use of a residual-current device (RCD) may allow the required disconnection times to be met.

=== IEC terminology ===
International standard IEC 60364 distinguishes three families of earthing arrangements, using the two-letter codes — TN, TT, and IT.

The first letter indicates the relationship between the power-supply (generator or transformer) and Earth:

"T" — Direct connection of a point to Earth.
"I" — All live parts isolated from Earth, or one point connected to Earth through an impedance.

The second letter indicates the relationship between the exposed-conductive-parts of the installation, and Earth:

"T" — Direct connection to Earth, independent of a power-supply connection to Earth.
"N" — Direct connection to the point on the power-supply where the power-supply connects to Earth. This point is typically the neutral point of a star-connected transformer, from where a neutral connection might also be provided.

Any subsequent letter(s) indicate:

"S" — Neutral and protective functions provided by separate conductors.
"C" — Neutral and protective functions provided by the same single conductor (PEN conductor).

The letters can reasonably be assumed to derive from French wording (the IEC standard is written in both French and English), with T deriving from terre (Earth); N from neutre (neutral); S from séparé (separate); C from combiné (combined); and I from both isolé and impédance (isolation and impedance — the two key details of an IT system).

==== Types of TN system ====
TN-S: separate protective earth (PE) and neutral (N) conductors from transformer to consuming device, which are not connected together at any point after the source.

TN-C: combined PE and N conductor all the way from the transformer to the consuming device (though not necessarily including power cords).

TN-C-S: combined PEN conductor from transformer to building, but separate PE and N conductors within building wiring (and device power cords).

In a TN earthing system, one of the points in the supply transformer is directly connected with Earth, usually the neutral-star-point in a star-connected supply transformer, the same point from which a neutral (N) connection would be provided. Exposed-conductive-parts within a consumer installation are connected with Earth via this connection at the transformer, and thus via the supply cable(s). The conductor that connects an exposed-conductive-part of the consumer's electrical installation to Earth is called the protective earth (PE; see also: Ground) conductor.

This arrangement is a current standard for residential and industrial electric systems particularly in Europe.

Three variants of TN systems are distinguished:

TN−S
PE and N are entirely separate conductors. If a neutral conductor is provided, and if the point from which the transformer connects to Earth is the neutral-star-point, then PE and N conductors will be connected at this one and only point within the system. Note that the armoring of the supply cable is commonly used as the PE conductor between the transformer and installation rather than a dedicated conductor within the supply cable.
TN−C
A single combined PEN conductor (PE+N) fulfils the functions of both a PE and an N conductor. This is not only so for the supply cable but within the consumer installation also (no separation of neutral and earthing). In 230/400 V consumer systems this is normally only used with distribution circuits.
TN−C−S
Part of the system uses a combined PEN conductor, which is at some point split up into separate PE and N conductors. The combined PEN conductor typically spans between the transformer and the consumer installation, with separate earth and neutral conductors used within the installation.

In the UK, a common practice with TN-C-S is to connect the combined PEN supply conductor to Earth at multiple points along its length between the source transformer and the consumer installation. This is known as protective multiple earthing (PME). This is so common that consequently PME is often incorrectly used as a synonym. Similar systems in Australia and New Zealand are designated as multiple earthed neutral (MEN) and, in North America, as multi-grounded neutral (MGN).

It is possible to have both TN-S and TN-C-S supplies taken from the same transformer. For example, the sheaths on some underground cables corrode and stop providing good earth connections, and so homes where high resistance "bad earths" are found may be converted to TN-C-S. This is only possible on a network when the neutral is suitably robust against failure. Conversion is not always possible. The PEN must be suitably reinforced against failure, as an open circuit PEN can impress full phase voltage on any exposed metal connected to the system earth downstream of the break. The alternative is to convert the installation to TT.

The main attraction of a TN system is that the low impedance earth path means that overcurrent protection devices can usually cut off the supply suitably quickly in the event of a (line-to-) earth fault. This is not typically the case for TT systems. The invention of residual current devices (RCDs) provided another means of protection from earth faults, which can be critical for a TT system as an RCD is often the only means of achieving suitable quick disconnection times, but is simply used as a secondary layer of protection in a TN system.

A danger of TN-C-S systems, especially for installations in rural locations where supplies are more likely to be provided with overhead cables exposed to the elements, or certain kinds of installations such as supplies to caravans or boats, is the risk of an open or broken PEN fault whereby the supply PEN conductor is severed or significantly corroded. In such a scenario current will take any alternate path available, and since extraneous-conductive-parts like water and gas pipes should be bonded to an installation's earthing, and the earthing is tied to the neutral, neutral current can still flow via the Earth, potentially passing through neighbouring properties (if their neutral is still intact), and voltage-to-Earth can rise significantly, especially should the break occur upstream of properties on different supply phases, in which case the floating neutral could cause voltage to rise as high as three-phase line-to-line voltage (400 V nominal in the UK). Hypothetically if no complete path existed for current to flow, then exposed-conductive-parts would rise to line voltage. PME helps mitigate risk somewhat. The danger is serious enough that the UK Electricity Safety, Quality and Continuity Regulations 2002 forbids use of PEN conductors to supply caravans and boats where simultaneous contact with Earth is especially high.

TN-C systems are not permitted in some countries. The UK for instance forbids it in the Electricity Safety, Quality and Continuity Regulations 2002. Note that an RCD cannot work on a TN-C system.

==== TT system ====
The TT earthing system

In a TT earthing system, just as with a TN system, there is a direct connection to Earth at the supply transformer. But, unlike TN, the exposed-conductive-parts at the consumer installation are independent from it, instead having an entirely separate connection to Earth via a local earth electrode (sometimes referred to as the terra firma connection). I.e. there is no 'earth wire' between supply and consumer, only a connection through the mass of the Earth.

The big advantage of the TT earthing system is the reduced conducted interference from other users' connected equipment. TT has always been preferable for special applications like telecommunication sites that benefit from the interference-free earthing. Also, TT systems do not pose any serious risks in the case of a broken neutral conductor. In addition, in locations where power is distributed overhead, earth conductors are not at risk of becoming live should any overhead distribution conductor be fractured by, say, a fallen tree or branch.

A big disadvantage of TT systems is that the impedance of the earth path is often so high that it can prevent overcurrent protection devices from breaking the supply sufficiently quickly to meet safety regulation. This issue though can be addressed by instead relying upon RCD protection, which does not require a large fault current to activate. In the pre-RCD era the TT earthing system was unattractive for general use because of this difficulty of achieving reliable automatic disconnection of supply (ADS).

In some countries (such as the UK) TT is recommended for situations where a low impedance equipotential zone is impractical to maintain by bonding, where there is significant outdoor wiring, such as supplies to mobile homes and some agricultural settings, or where a high fault current could pose other dangers, such as at fuel depots or marinas. The TT earthing system is used throughout Spain and Japan, with RCD units in most industrial settings or even at home. This can impose added requirements on variable frequency drives and switched-mode power supplies which often have substantial filters passing high frequency noise to the ground conductor.

==== IT system ====
The IT earthing system

In an IT earthing system, the electrical distribution system either has no connection to Earth at all, or such connection is of very high-impedance.

In IT systems, a single insulation fault is unlikely to cause dangerous currents to flow through a human body in contact with Earth, because either no fault path exists for fault current to flow through, or otherwise it is of high impedance. This system enables one or more faults to occur between one live conductor and earthing, known as a first fault condition, without triggering automatic disconnection of supply. Instead the condition might trigger a monitoring device into raising an alarm. A second fault condition occurs when one or more additional live conductors also short to earthing, in which case a significant surge of current can flow between the shorted live conductors, via the earthing, and the supply should be cut off. This system can be useful for installations such as hospitals, where circuit disconnection itself can have life threatening implications (for instance should life support systems or an active surgical operation lose power). An alarm being raised in the event of a first fault provides an opportunity for staff to take corrective action which could avoid such loss of power.

In a multi-phase system, if one of the line conductors made contact with earth, it would cause the other phase conductors to rise from normal phase-neutral voltage, to phase-phase voltage (relative to earth). IT systems also experience larger transient overvoltages than other systems.

=== Comparison ===
	TT	IT	TN-S	TN-C	TN-C-S
Earth fault loop impedance	High	Highest	Low	Low	Low
RCD required?	Yes, often mandatory	Preferred	Optional	N/A	Optional
Earth electrode needed at site?	Yes	Yes	No	No	Optional
Broken PEN danger	N/A	N/A	N/A	Highest	High
Safety	Safe	Less Safe	Safest	Least Safe	Safe
Electromagnetic interference	Least	Least	Low	High	Low
Safety risks	High loop impedance (step voltages)	Overvoltage	Broken PE	Broken PEN	Broken PEN
Advantages	Safe and reliable	Continuity of operation, cost	Safest	Cost	Safety and cost

=== Other terminologies ===
While the national wiring regulations for buildings of many countries follow the IEC 60364 terminology, in North America (United States and Canada), the term "equipment grounding conductor" refers to equipment grounds and ground wires on branch circuits, and "grounding electrode conductor" is used for conductors bonding an earth/ground rod, electrode or similar to a service panel. The "local" earth/ground electrode provides "system grounding" at each building where it is installed.

The "grounded" current carrying conductor is the system "neutral".

Australian and New Zealand standards use a modified protective multiple earthing (PME) system called multiple earthed neutral (MEN). The neutral is grounded (earthed) at each consumer service point thereby effectively bringing the neutral potential difference towards zero along the whole length of LV lines. In North America, the term multigrounded neutral (MGN) is used.

In the UK and some Commonwealth countries, the term "PNE", meaning phase-neutral-earth is used to indicate that three (or more for non-single-phase connections) conductors are used, i.e., PN-S.

=== Resistance-earthed neutral (India) ===
A resistance earth system is used for mining in India as per Central Electricity Authority Regulations. Instead of a solid connection of neutral to earth, a neutral grounding resistor (NGR) is used to limit the current to ground to less than 750 mA. Due to the fault current restriction it is safer for gassy mines. Since the earth leakage is restricted, leakage protection devices can be set to less than 750 mA. By comparison, in a solidly earthed system, earth fault current can be as much as the available short-circuit current.

The neutral earthing resistor is monitored to detect an interrupted ground connection and to shut off power if a fault is detected.

=== Earth leakage protection ===
To avoid accidental shock, current sensing devices are used at installations to isolate the power when leakage current exceeds a certain limit. RCDs are used for this purpose. Previously, for a short period before the invention of the RCD, voltage-operated earth leakage circuit breaker (VO-ELCB) devices were used. In industrial applications, earth leakage relays are used with separate core balanced current transformers. This protection works in the range of milli-Amps and can be set from 30 mA to 3000 mA.

=== Earth connectivity check ===
A separate pilot wire is run from distribution/ equipment supply system in addition to earth wire, to supervise the continuity of the wire. This is used in the trailing cables of mining machinery. If the earth wire is broken, the pilot wire allows a sensing device at the source end to interrupt power to the machine. This type of circuit is a must for portable heavy electric equipment (like LHD (Load, Haul, Dump machine)) being used in underground mines.

=== Electromagnetic compatibility ===
- In TN-S and TT systems, the consumer has a low-noise connection to Earth, which does not suffer from the voltage that appears on the N conductor as a result of the return currents and the impedance of that conductor. This is of particular importance with some types of telecommunication and measurement equipment.
- In TT systems, each consumer has its own connection to Earth, and will not notice any currents that may be caused by other consumers on a shared PE line.

=== Regulations ===
- In the UK the Electricity Safety, Quality and Continuity Regulations 2002 (GB; 2012 for NI) governs electrical supplies. Highlights include: TN-C supplies are forbidden; Cable armouring ("outer conductor of a line with concentric conductors") must be connected to Earth; Every supply neutral must be connected to Earth; Consumers are forbidden from combining earth and neutral within their installations; and PEN conductor based supplies (TN-C-S) are forbidden to caravans and boats.
- In the United States National Electrical Code and Canadian Electrical Code, the supply from the distribution transformer must be TN-C-S. The neutral must be connected to earth only on the supply side of the customer's disconnecting switch.
- In Argentina, Australia (TN-C-S), France (TT), Israel (TN-C-S), and New Zealand (TN-C-S), the customers must provide their own ground connections.
- In Australia and New Zealand, the multiple earthed neutral (MEN) earthing system is used, described in Section 5 of AS/NZS 3000. For a low-voltage (e.g. domestic) customer, this means TN-C-S, with the neutral connected to Earth multiple times between the supply transformer and the consumer installation, and with the neutral-earth split occurring from the Main Switchboard.
- In Japan building wiring uses TT earthing in most installations.
- In Denmark the high voltage regulation (Stærkstrømsbekendtgørelsen) and Malaysia the Electricity Ordinance 1994 states that all consumers must use TT earthing, though in rare cases TN-C-S may be allowed (used in the same manner as in the United States). Rules are different when it comes to larger companies.
- In India as per Central Electricity Authority Regulations, CEAR, 2010, rule 41, there is provision of earthing, neutral wire of a 3-phase, 4-wire system and the additional third wire of a 2-phase, 3-wire system. Earthing is to be done with two separate connections. The grounding system must also have a minimum of two or more earth pits (electrodes) to better ensure proper grounding. According to rule 42, an installation with a connected load above 5 kW exceeding 250 V shall have a suitable earth leakage protective device to isolate the load in case of earth fault or leakage.

=== Application examples ===
- In the areas of UK where underground power cabling is prevalent, the TN-S system is common. Older urban and suburban homes in the UK tend to have TN-S supplies where the earth connection is delivered through a lead sheath of an underground lead-and-paper cable.
- In India, supply is generally through TN-S system. Neutral is double grounded at each distribution transformer. Neutral and earth conductors run separately on overhead distribution lines. Separate conductors for overhead lines and armoring of cables are used for earth connection. Additional earth electrodes/pits are installed at each user end to provide redundant path to Earth.
- Most modern homes in Europe have a TN-C-S earthing system. The combined neutral and earth occurs between the nearest transformer substation and the service cut out (the fuse before the meter). After this, separate earth and neutral cores are used in all the internal wiring.
- In Norway the IT system with 230 V between the phases is quite extensively used. It is estimated that 70% of all households are connected to the grid via the IT system. Newer residential areas are however mostly built with TN-C-S, in a large degree driven by the fact that three-phase products for the consumer market - such as electric vehicle charging stations - are developed for the European market where TN systems with 400V between the phases dominate.
- Laboratory rooms, medical facilities, construction sites, repair workshops, mobile electrical installations, and other environments that are supplied via engine-generators where there is an increased risk of insulation faults, often use an IT earthing arrangement supplied from isolation transformers. To mitigate the two-fault issues with IT systems, the isolation transformers should supply only a small number of loads each and should be protected with an insulation monitoring device (generally used only by medical, railway or military IT systems, because of cost).
- In remote areas, where the cost of an additional PE conductor outweighs the cost of a local Earth connection, TT systems are commonly used in some countries, especially in older properties or in rural areas, where safety might otherwise be threatened by the fracture of an overhead PE conductor by, say, a fallen tree branch.
- In Australia the TN-C-S system is in use; however, the wiring rules state that, in addition, each customer must provide a separate connection to Earth, via a dedicated earth electrode. (Any metallic water pipes entering the consumer's premises must also be "bonded" to the earthing point at the distribution Switchboard/Panel.) In Australia and New Zealand the connection between the protective earth bar and the neutral bar at the main Switchboard/Panel is called the multiple earthed neutral Link or MEN Link. This MEN link is removable for installation testing purposes, but is connected during normal service by either a locking system (locknuts for instance) or two or more screws. In the MEN system, the integrity of the neutral is paramount. In Australia, new installations must also bond the foundation concrete re-enforcing under wet areas to the protective earth conductor (AS3000), typically increasing the size of the earthing (i.e. reducing resistance), and providing an equipotential plane in areas such as bathrooms. In older installations, it is not uncommon to find only the water pipe bond, and it is allowed to remain as such, but the additional earth electrode must be installed if any upgrade work is done. The incoming protective earth/neutral conductor is connected to a neutral bar (located on the customer's side of the electricity meter's neutral connection) which is then connected via the customer's MEN link to the earth bar – beyond this point, the protective earth and neutral conductors are separate.

== High-voltage systems ==
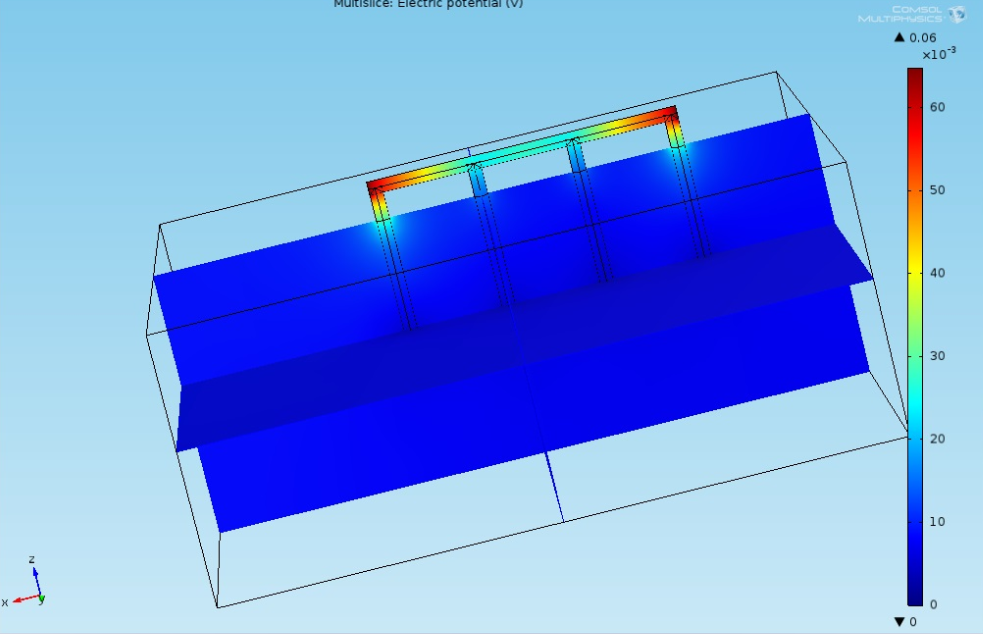
Simulation of multiple grounding in one layer soil

In high-voltage networks (above 1 kV), which are far less accessible to the general public, the focus of earthing system design is less on safety and more on reliability of supply, reliability of protection, and impact on the equipment in presence of a short circuit. Only the magnitude of phase-to-ground short circuits, which are the most common, is significantly affected with the choice of earthing system, as the current path is mostly closed through the earth. Three-phase HV/MV power transformers, located in distribution substations, are the most common source of supply for distribution networks, and type of grounding of their neutral determines the earthing system.

There are five types of neutral earthing:

- Solid-earthed neutral
- Unearthed neutral
- Resistance-earthed neutral
  - Low-resistance earthing
  - High-resistance earthing
- Reactance-earthed neutral
- Using earthing transformers (such as the Zigzag transformer)

=== Solid-earthed neutral ===
In solid or directly earthed neutral, transformer's star point is directly connected to the ground. In this solution, a low-impedance path is provided for the ground fault current to close and, as result, their magnitudes are comparable with three-phase fault currents. Since the neutral remains at the potential close to the ground, voltages in unaffected phases remain at levels similar to the pre-fault ones; for that reason, this system is regularly used in high-voltage transmission networks, where insulation costs are high.

=== Resistance-earthed neutral ===
To limit short circuit earth fault an additional neutral earthing resistor (NER) is added between the neutral of transformer's star point and earth.

==== Low-resistance earthing ====
With low resistance fault current limit is relatively high. In India it is restricted for 50 A for open cast mines according to Central Electricity Authority Regulations, CEAR, 2010, rule 100.

==== High-resistance earthing ====
High resistance grounding system grounds the neutral through a resistance which limits the ground fault current to a value equal to or slightly greater than the capacitive charging current of that system.

=== Unearthed neutral ===
In unearthed, isolated or floating neutral system, as in the IT system, there is no direct connection of the star point (or any other point in the network) and Earth. As a result, ground fault currents have no path to be closed and thus have negligible magnitudes. However, in practice, the fault current will not be equal to zero: conductors in the circuit — particularly underground cables — have an inherent capacitance towards the Earth, which provides a path of relatively high impedance.

Systems with isolated neutral may continue operation and provide uninterrupted supply even in presence of a ground fault. However, while the fault is present, the potential of other two phases relative to the ground reaches $\sqrt{3}$ of the normal operating voltage, creating additional stress for the insulation; insulation failures may inflict additional ground faults in the system, now with much higher currents.

Presence of uninterrupted ground fault may pose a significant safety risk: if the current exceeds 4 A – 5 A an electric arc develops, which may be sustained even after the fault is cleared. For that reason, they are chiefly limited to underground and submarine networks, and industrial applications, where the reliability need is high and probability of human contact relatively low. In urban distribution networks with multiple underground feeders, the capacitive current may reach several tens of amperes, posing significant risk for the equipment.

The benefit of low fault current and continued system operation thereafter is offset by inherent drawback that the fault location is hard to detect.

== Grounding rods ==
According to the IEEE standards, grounding rods are made from material such as copper and steel. For choosing a grounding rod there are several selection criteria such as: corrosion resistance, diameter depending on the fault current, conductivity and others. There are several types derived from copper and steel: copper-bonded, stainless-steel, solid copper, galvanized steel ground. In recent decades, there has been developed chemical grounding rods for low impedance ground containing natural electrolytic salts and Nano-Carbon Fiber Grounding rods.

== Grounding connectors ==
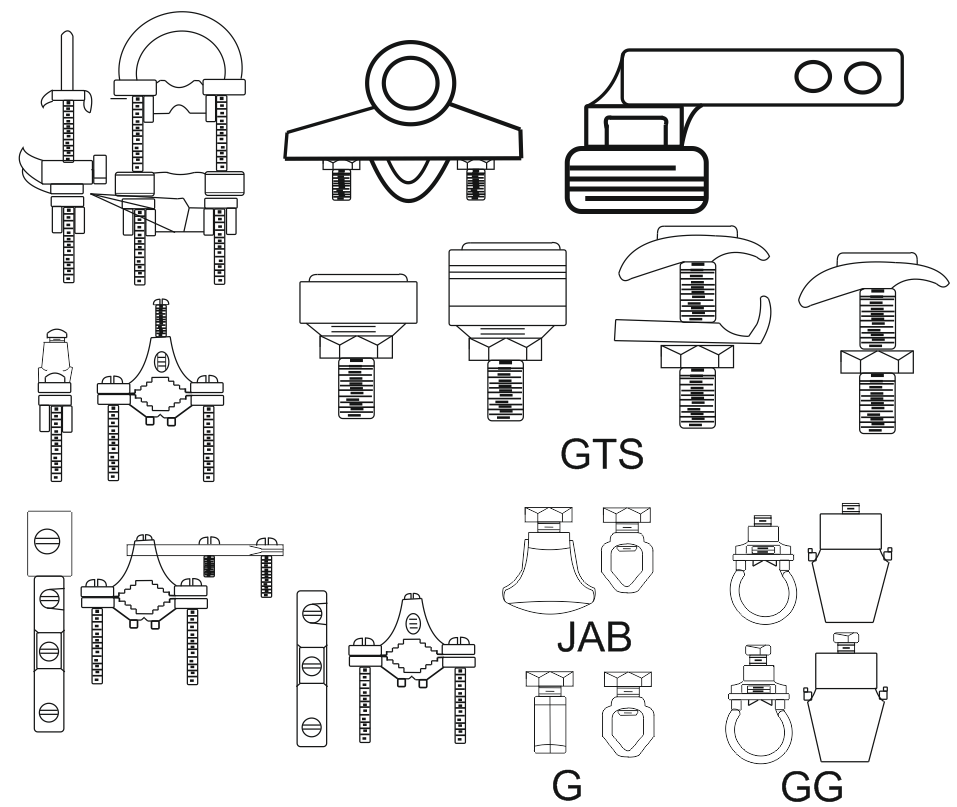
Grounding connectors

Connectors for earthing installation are a means of communication between the various components of the earthing and lightning protection installations (earthing rods, earthing conductors, current leads, busbars, etc.).

For high voltage installations, exothermic welding is used for underground connections.

== Soil resistance ==
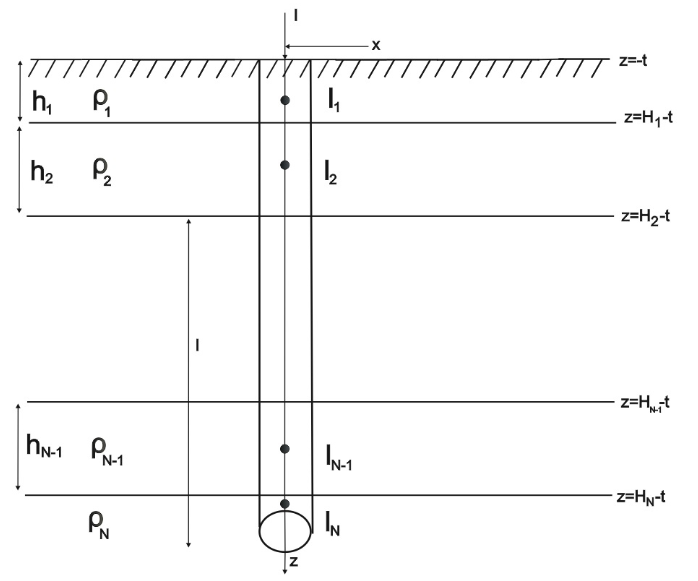
Vertical stress of a soil

Soil resistance is a major aspect in the design and calculation of an earthing system/grounding installation. Its resistance determines the efficiency of the diversion of unwanted currents to zero potential (ground). The resistance of a geological material depends on several components: the presence of metal ores, the temperature of the geological layer, the presence of archeological or structural features, the presence of dissolved salts, and contaminants, porosity and permeability. There are several basic methods for measuring soil resistance. The measurement is performed with two, three or four electrodes. The measurement methods are: pole-pole, dipole-dipole, pole-dipole, Wenner method, and the Schlumberger method.

== See also ==
- Lightning rod
- Electrical wiring
- Ground and neutral
