= Charles Dalziel =

American electrical engineer and academic

Charles Dalziel (1904–1986) was a professor of electrical engineering and computer sciences at UC Berkeley. According to volume 54 of UCB's Blue and Gold, Dalziel graduated with a Mechanics degree in 1927 and was from Santa Maria, CA. He was a member of: Eta Kappa Nu, Tau Beta Pi, American Institute of Electrical Engineers, De Molay Club (VP), and Engineers Council.

He studied the effects of electricity on animals and humans. He wrote The Effects of Electric Shock on Man, a book in which he explains the effects of different amounts of electricity on human subjects. He also invented the ground-fault circuit interrupter or GFCI in 1961. The GFCI is commonly found in home bathrooms or kitchens. The device operates normally until 5 milliamps passes from the appliance to ground. Charles Dalziel was a pioneer in understanding electric shock in humans.

Dalziel married Helen Bradford in 1931. They had a daughter, Isabelle. After Helen died of cancer in 1963, Charles married Alice Sohl Lundberg in 1969.

== See also ==
- Self-experimentation
