= Conductor clashing =

Electrical issue from unintended contact

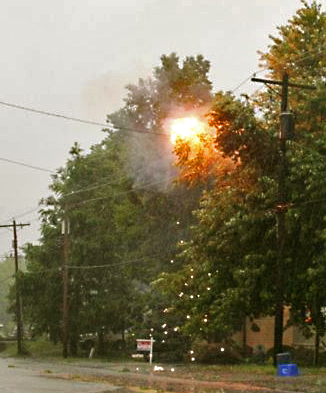
Short circuit in an overhead electrical distribution line

In an overhead power line, conductor clashing occurs when energized wires accidentally come into contact with each other. Overhead transmission systems typically use un-insulated bare conductors for reasons of weight and economy. When bare conductors touch, the resulting momentary short circuit or electric arc can cause disturbances to the electric power system, damage to the conductors, or fire. Conductor clashing may be caused by wind, ice, excess sag due to creep or thermal expansion due to sustained heavy loading, or by contact with animals or objects. Conductor clash is prevented by proper design and installation to anticipate the likely conditions of weather and load. The effects of clashing conductors can be mitigated by fuses or protective relays and circuit breakers to de-energize the shorted conductors. For some types of transmission line, it may be possible to automatically reclose a circuit breaker in expectation that the clash was a momentary problem, thus minimizing interruption of service to grid customers.

== Causes ==
Heavy winds or gusts can often result in the unintended contact of conductors, particularly where power lines exhibit excessive sag or other structural conditions that permit conductors to come into close proximity.

Trees near power lines may break and drop branches onto the wires, increasing the potential for conductors to clash by bringing them together.

Vehicles may hit transmission towers or poles, and aircraft may get entangled in wires. This may cause power lines to clash. This type of collision, often the result of accidents, can have a cascading effect on the power system, leading to conductor clashing.

Seismic activity may displace transmission line support structures, disturbing the planned spacing of conductors and possibly producing a clash.

Acts of vandalism targeted at power lines introduce another reason for conductor clashing. Deliberate acts of hurling objects at power lines can induce drooping and the subsequent collision of wires.

== Process ==
When conductors clash, heat is produced, along with vaporization of conductor material, and the expulsion of metal particles. These ejected particles, often in the form of sparks, are then carried away by the wind.

The combustion aspect is driven by the release of energy in the form of an electrical arc (electrical breakdown of gas resulting in electrical discharge). Simultaneously, the conductor material erodes and vaporizes due to the intense heat generated by this arc. The process is significantly influenced by key parameters, including arc voltage, short-circuit current, and the duration of the arc. A higher arc voltage intensifies the energy of the electrical arc, while an increased short-circuit current leads to more substantial heat generation and vaporization of the conductor material. The duration of the arc plays a critical role, impacting the extent of material vaporization and potentially leading to molten or burning particles.

Contact between conductors may produce an electric arc with a bright flash, the emission of sparks, and a puff of white smoke. The intense heat of the arc causes the underlying metal to reach its boiling point and vaporize. When these vaporized metal particles come into contact with the air, they ignite and burn rapidly, forming $\ce{Al2O3}$ (aluminum oxide) as small aerosol particles. These aerosol particles can reach temperatures anywhere from 930 K (Kelvin) to 2730 K and create the characteristic puff of smoke. When the oxide is in a molten state, the oxidation process proceeds rapidly, with the heat generated by oxidation offsetting heat losses through convection and radiation. These droplets will continue to burn until all the metal is consumed or until they reach the ground.

== Effects ==
Fire ignition resulting from conductor clashing has been a recurring issue worldwide, with numerous instances occurring in various countries. Such incidents can lead to significant environmental damage, such as forest fires, as well as substantial financial losses and, in some cases, pose potential threats to human lives.

An example of a conductor clashing catastrophe occurred in Western Australia on December 2, 2004. A 19.1 kV (kilovolt) conductor became dislodged from a pole-mounted insulator at the first pole and subsequently clashed with the underslung running earth conductor approximately 200 meters away. This collision led to a flashover (ignition of combustible material in an enclosed area), releasing hot metal particles (sparks) that ignited dry harvested stubble, which initiated the wildfire. Amid the fire, both conductors snapped, with the first conductor ultimately succumbing to structural wear and the influence of northerly winds. When both conductors fell and made contact with the dividing fence, the wildfire was ignited. It's worth noting that the property owner had previously reported a low-hanging power line conductor adjacent to the first pole. According to the property owner's estimate, roughly 468 hectares of land had been burned.
