= Zigzag transformer =

Type of electric transformer

A zigzag transformer winding is a special-purpose transformer winding with a zigzag or "interconnected star" connection, such that each output is the vector sum of two (2) phases offset by 120°. It is used as a grounding transformer, creating a missing neutral connection from an ungrounded 3-phase system to permit the grounding of that neutral to an earth reference point; to perform harmonic mitigation, as they can suppress triplet (3rd, 9th, 15th, 21st, etc.) harmonic currents; to supply 3-phase power as an autotransformer (serving as the primary and secondary with no isolated circuits); and to supply non-standard, phase-shifted, 3-phase power.

9-winding zigzag transformer

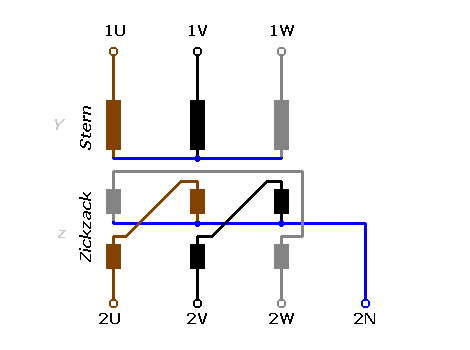
Zigzag transformer

Nine-winding, three-phase transformers typically have three primaries and six identical secondary windings, which can be used in zigzag winding connection as pictured.

A conventional six-winding, grounding transformer or zigzag bank,with the same winding and core quantity as a conventional three-phase transformer, can also be used in zigzag winding connection.

In all cases the first coil on each zigzag winding core is connected contrariwise to the second coil on the next core. The second coils are then all tied together to form the neutral, and the phases are connected to the primary coils. Each phase, therefore, couples with each other phase, and the voltages cancel out. As such, there would be negligible current through the neutral point, as the Zig-Zag has a high positive and negative sequence impedance, with a low zero-sequence impedance which can be tied to ground.

Each of the three "limbs" are split into two sections. The two halves of each limb have an equal number of turns and are wound in opposite directions. With the neutral grounded, during a phase-to-ground short fault, a third of the current returns to the fault current, and the remainder must go through two of the three phases when used to derive a grounding point from a delta source.

If one or more phases fault to earth, the voltage applied to each phase of the transformer is no longer in balance; fluxes in the windings no longer oppose. (Using symmetrical components, this is I_{a0} = I_{b0} = I_{c0}.) Zero-sequence (earth fault) current exists between the transformer’s neutral to the faulting phase. The purpose of a zigzag transformer in this application is to provide a return path for earth faults on delta-connected systems. With negligible current in the neutral under normal conditions, an undersized (unable to carry a continuous fault load) transformer may be used only as short-time rating is required, provided the defective load will be automatically disconnected in a fault condition. The transformer's impedance should not be too low for desired maximum fault current. Impedance can be added after the secondaries are summed to limit maximum fault currents (the 3I_{o} path).

A combination of Y (wye or star), delta, and zigzag windings may be used to achieve a vector phase shift. For example, an electrical network may have a transmission network of 110 kV/33 kV star/star transformers, with 33 kV/11 kV delta/star for the high voltage distribution network. If a transformation is required directly between the 110 kV/11 kV network an option is to use a 110 kV/11 kV star/delta transformer. The problem is that the 11 kV delta no longer has an earth reference point. Installing a zigzag transformer near the secondary side of the 110 kV/11 kV transformer provides the required earth reference point.

== Applications ==
Zigzag transformers are often required by utilities when connecting three-phase inverters (usually for renewable energy) to the grid to provide a stable neutral voltage and prevent excessive phase-to-ground voltages. This also protects the switching devices inside the inverters, which are usually insulated-gate bipolar transistors (IGBTs).
