= Fault-Managed Power Systems =

Class of electrical power distribution

Fault-Managed Power (FMP), also known as Class 4 Fault-Managed Power, is a method of electrical power distribution defined in Article 726 of the 2023 National Electrical Code (NEC). The NEC classifies it as a system that monitors for faults and limits the energy delivered during a fault condition, rather than limiting total power output.

== History ==
The concept of transmitting electrical power in discrete packets over network conductors was described by Stephen S. Eaves in a paper presented at the 2012 IEEE 34th International Telecommunications Energy Conference. According to ''In Compliance'' magazine, Eaves incorporated VoltServer in 2011 and launched the first commercial FMP systems in 2015.

According to the Telecommunications Industry Association (TIA), because FMP technology did not fit into any existing NEC definitions for power circuits, code officials were initially reluctant to permit FMP installations. Class 4 circuits were subsequently added to the 2023 NEC as Article 726.

In the electrical industry, FMP has also been referred to by the terms Packet Energy Transfer, Digital Electricity, Pulsed Power, and Smart Transfer Systems.

== Technology ==
Class 4 FMP systems support load circuits up to 450V peak AC or DC and can transmit power over longer distances than Class 2 systems. Unlike Class 2 circuits, which cap power at 100 watts and 60 VDC, FMP systems are not power-limited for normal loads. Instead, they restrict current only when a fault is detected.

FMP systems are tested to prevent fire hazards from short circuits, series arcs, and line-to-line resistance. Upon detecting a fault, the system interrupts power flow within milliseconds. FMP also monitors for shock hazards by detecting line-to-ground, line-to-line, and line-pair faults, expanding the scope of protection beyond standard Ground Fault Circuit Interrupters (GFCIs).

FMP's resemblance to data transmission practices led VoltServer to describe the technology as "digital electricity," and that it was initially developed to serve cellular communications, particularly 5G radio equipment, where higher power demand would otherwise require separate AC supply lines and fiber optic data cables.

== Standards and safety ==
Standardization efforts began in 2020, when UL formed a working group to address power delivery technologies that did not fit within Classes 1, 2, or 3. This resulted in UL 1400-1, covering system-level safety requirements, and UL 1400-2, covering cabling requirements, both published in 2022. A separate telecommunications standard, ATIS-0600040, defines fault energy thresholds and human contact fault analysis requirements.

The 2023 NEC formally established Class 4 as a distinct power circuit classification under Article 726. Under that article, Class 4 transmitters and receivers must be listed together as a system and marked with maximum voltage and current ratings.

== Industry adoption ==
Prior to its NEC codification, Class 4 power had already been deployed in power distribution infrastructure, LED lighting, passive optical networks, and distributed antenna systems at airports, offices, and manufacturing sites. As of 2024, only 13 U.S. states had completed the 2023 NEC update process, meaning widespread adoption could take several more years.

Electrical Contractor magazine reported on a deployment in which FMP was used to provide power and signal to 23 new 5G radios at a stadium, allowing a single centralized electrical closet and uninterruptible power supply to serve equipment over distances exceeding 2,000 meters using copper and fiber cable.

In April 2024, the FMP Alliance was established as an open industry association to promote interoperability and adoption of Class 4 power systems. Founding members included Belden, Cisco Systems, Panduit, Prysmian Group, and VoltServer.

The National Electrical Contractors Association (NECA) published NECA 726, Standard for Installing and Maintaining Class 4 Fault-Managed Power Systems, to provide industry guidance for safe installation and maintenance practices.
