= Insulation monitoring device =

Electrical equipment

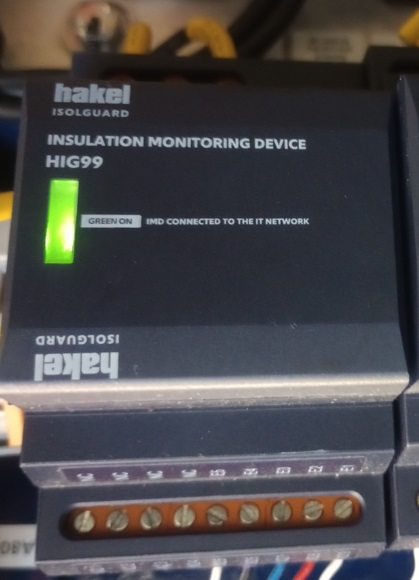
Insulation monitoring device

An insulation monitoring device monitors the ungrounded system between an active phase conductor and earth. It is intended to give an alert (light and sound) or disconnect the power supply when the resistance between the two conductors drops below a set value, usually 50 kΩ (sample of IEC standard for medical applications). The main advantage is that the ungrounded or floating system allows a continuous operation of important consumers such as medical, chemical, military, etc.

Some manufacturers of monitors for these systems are capable of handling VFDs (Variable Frequency (Speed) Drives). Most, however are not due to issues with the DC-portions of the VFDs.

Most monitors work by injecting low level DC on the line and detecting. Some manufacturers use a patented AMP-monitoring principle (Adapted Measuring Pulse)

== Insulation Monitoring Devices (IMD) according to IEC 61557-8 ==
This part of IEC 61557 specifies requirements for insulation monitoring devices (IMD), which permanently monitor the insulation resistance R_{F} to earth of unearthed a.c. IT systems, of a.c. IT systems with galvanically connected d.c. circuits having nominal voltages up to 1 000 V a.c., as well as of unearthed d.c. IT systems with voltages up to 1 500 V d.c. independent from the method of measuring.

According to 61557-8: Insulation monitoring devices must be able to monitor both symmetrical and asymmetrical insulation faults according to their specified measuring principle. A symmetrical fault in insulation occurs when the insulation resistance of all conductors in the network to be monitored is (approximately) evenly reduced. An unsymmetrical fault in insulation occurs when the insulation resistance, e.g. of one conductor is reduced much more than that of the remaining conductor(s). Relays, which use the unbalance voltage (3 voltmeter method), are not insulation monitoring devices according to this standard. Under special network conditions, a combination of several measurement methods may be necessary to fulfill the monitoring task, including an asymmetry monitoring.

== Terminology ==
Terminology differs by region and by market segment.

- For the system type different terms are used: "IT system" (lat. Isolation Terra) vs. "floating system" vs. "ungrounded system".
- For the monitoring device different terms are used: "Insulation monitoring device" vs. "ground fault relay" vs. "ground fault detector" vs. "LIM" (Line Isolation Monitor)

== Standards ==
- IEC 61557-8:2014, "Electrical safety in low voltage distribution systems up to 1 000 V a.c. and 1 500 V d.c. - Equipment for testing, measuring or monitoring of protective measures - Part 8: Insulation monitoring devices for IT systems"
- IEC 61557-9:2014, "Electrical safety in low voltage distribution systems up to 1000 V a.c. and 1500 V d.c. - Equipment for testing, measuring or monitoring of protective measures - Part 9: Equipment for insulation fault location in IT systems"

== Literature ==
- Wolfgang Hofheinz: Protective Measures with Insulation Monitoring VDE Application of Unearthed IT Power Systems in Industry, Mining, Railways, Marine/ Oil and Electric/Rail Vehicles, ISBN 978-3-8007-2958-6, E-Book: ISBN 978-3-8007-4106-9
