= Wind power in Croatia =

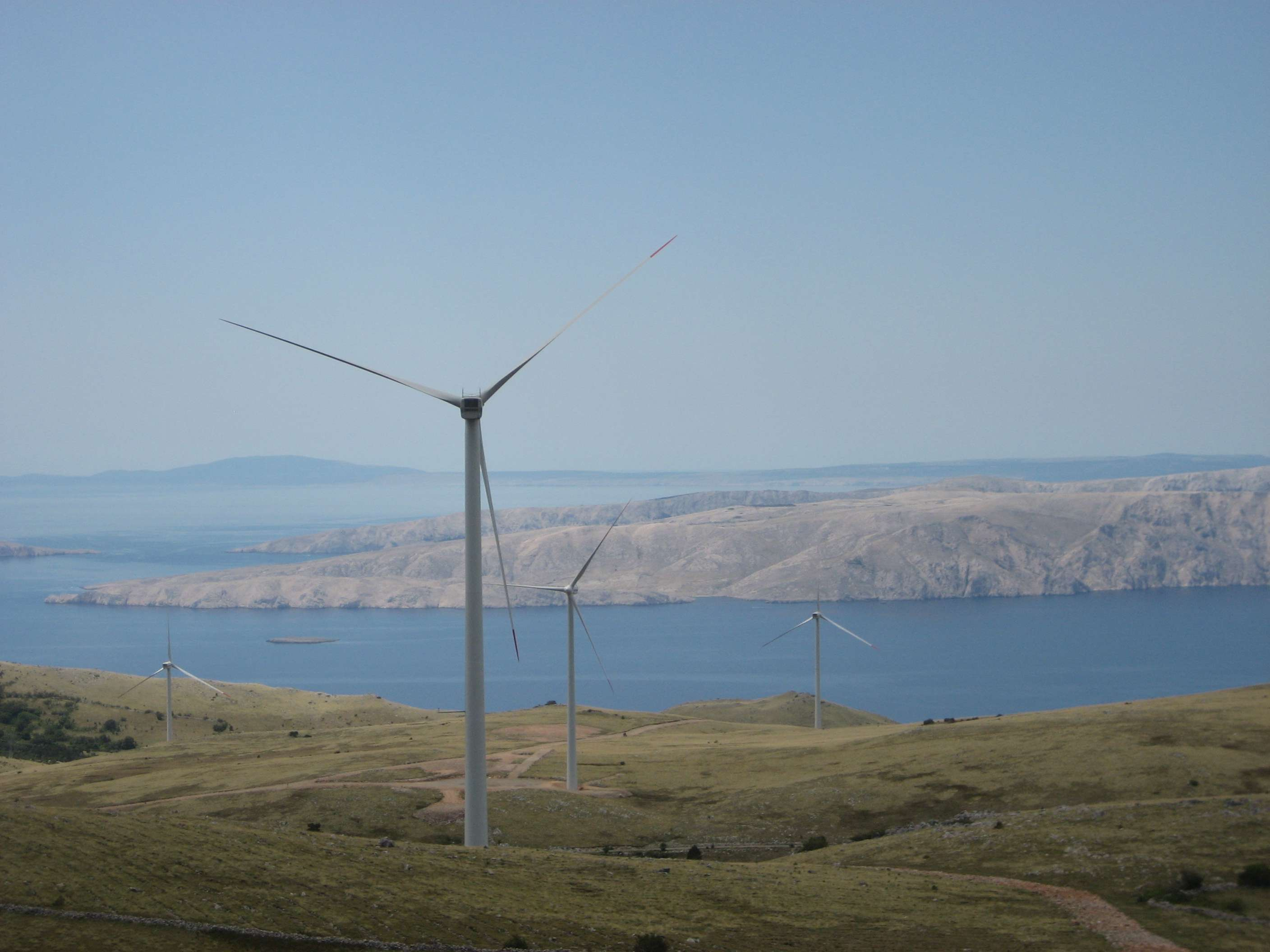
Windpark near Senj, Croatia

Wind power in Croatia has been growing since the first wind farm was installed in the country in 2004. During 2021, the energy produced from wind farms amounted to 1,904 GWh. The total wind power grid-connected capacity in Croatia was 1,375 MW as of 2025.

== History ==
The first wind farm was installed on the island of Pag in 2004. In 2006 another farm opened near Šibenik. On July 1, 2007 the Croatian Government enacted five bylaws on incentives to electricity generation from renewable resources, including feed-in tariffs.

Currently in Croatia there's a total of 364 wind turbines which generate total of 970.15 MW or electric energy, but with new turbines coming on-line all the time, it is expected that by mid 2020s total installed power will reach 3,200 MW, As of early 2020 Croatia generates around 28.3% renewable energy, Government hopes Croatia could generate around 37.5% renewable energy from wind and solar by 2030 and has adopted new strategy to achieve that target. By the end of 2021 renewable energy in Croatia is expected to generate around 1060 MW from Wind and Solar alone or around 32% of all energy consumption from renewable energy source, Croatia exceeded EU's renewable energy targets and exceed that by a wide margin. In 2020 country generated 28.3% of all its energy from the renewable sources of energy, installed capacity at the end of 2020 includes 89 MW Solar farms and these are set to double in 2021 to 184 MW installed capacity, 803.1 MW Wind farm are set to increase to at least 875 MW by end of 2021, and other sources such as biomass and other sources will exceed 2020 figure of total 3,226 MW installed renewable energy generation by significant margin. At present rate of growth and planned investments over next 5-7 year period, energy generated from Wind and solar should easily reach 40% of total energy consumption in Croatia with 50% highly probable, achieving targets set by Germany, Sweden, Norway, Denmark, Finland and Austria. Although Croatian Government has set modest targets in terms of renewable energy share of total energy consumption, initially 20% by 2020 and now modest 37.5% by 2030 or 54% by 2050, the country is rapidly approaching targets set for 2050, at current rate of expansion of renewable sources in Croatia, it is quite possible by 2035 Croatia will meet its 2050 targets, some 15 years ahead.

== List of wind farms ==
Wind farm	Production capacity (MW)	Annual production (GWh)	Wind turbines	Year of commissioning	Source
VE Senj	156	530	39 x Shanghai Electric – 4.0 MW	2021	
VE Krš-Pađene	142	480	48 x Nordex	2021	
VE Korlat	58	170	18 x Nordex – 3.2 MW	2021	
VE Lukovac	48	110	7 x GE Energy – 2.85 MW; 9 x GE Energy – 3.2 MW	2017	
VE Poštak	44.2	100	13 × Siemens – 3.4 MW	2017	
VE Danilo	43.7	100	19 × Enercon – 2.3 MW	2014	
VE Vrataruša	42	125	14 × Vestas – 3 MW	2010	
VE Zelengrad	42	110	14 × Vestas – 3 MW	2014	
VE Ogorje	42	100	14 × Vestas – 3 MW	2015	
VE Kamensko-Voštane	40	114	14 × Siemens – 3 MW	2013	
VE Bruška	36.8	122	16 × Siemens – 2.3 MW	2011	
VE Ponikve	36.8	122	16 × Enercon – 2.3 MW	2012	
VE Rudine	34.2	85	12 × GE Energy – 2.85 MW	2015	
VE Katuni	34.2	95	12 × GE Energy – 2.85 MW	2016	
VE Ljubač	32.4	96	9 x Nordex – 3.6 MW	2022	
VE Jelinak	30	81	20 × Acciona – 1.5 MW	2013	
VE Glunča	20.7	53	9 x Enercon – 2.3 MW	2016	
VE Pometeno brdo	20	50	15 × Končar – 1 MW; 2 × Končar – 2.5 MW	2015	
VE Jasenice	11.5	44	5 x Enercon – 2.3 MW	2020	
VE Trtar-Krtolin	11.2	28	14 × Enercon – 0.8 MW	2007	
VE Crno brdo	10.5	27	7 × Leitwind – 1.5 MW	2011	
VE Orlice	9.6	25	3 x Enercon – 0.8 MW; 8 x Enercon – 0.9 MW	2009	
VE Velika Popina	9.2	26	4 × Siemens – 2.3 MW	2011	
VE Zadar 4	9.2	30	4 × Siemens – 2.3 MW	2013	
VE Ravne 1	5.95	15	7 × Vestas – 0.85 MW	2004	
In total	970.15	2,838	364	2004–2022	

== See also ==
- Renewable energy in the European Union
- Renewable energy development
- Energy in Croatia
- Renewable energy by country
