= Marija Pejčinović Burić =

Croatian politician (born 1963)

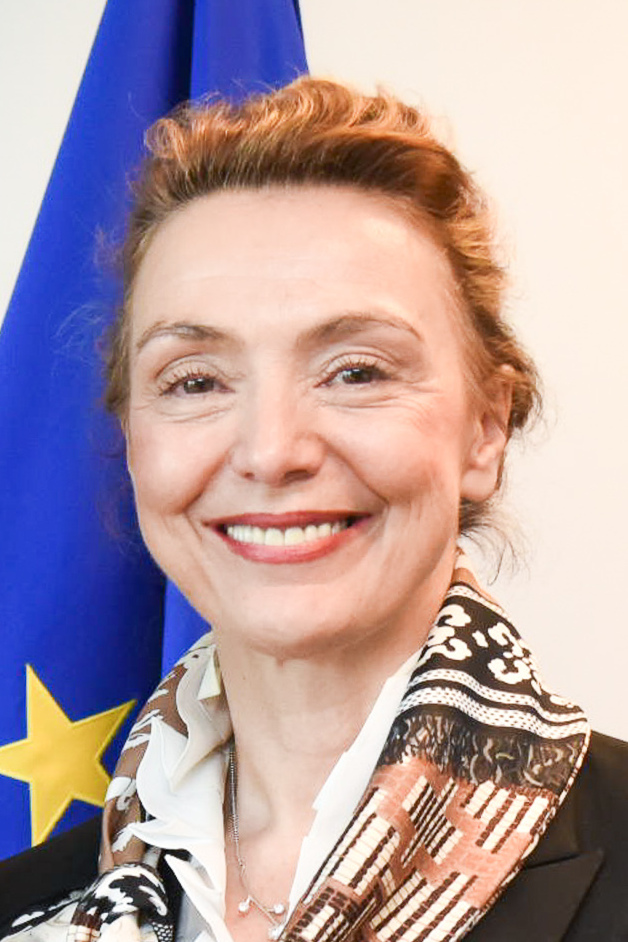
- Pejčinović Burić in 2020

Secretary General of the Council of Europe
- In office 18 September 2019 – 18 September 2024
- Preceded by: Thorbjørn Jagland
- Succeeded by: Alain Berset

First Deputy Prime Minister of Croatia
- In office 19 June 2017 – 19 July 2019
- Prime Minister: Andrej Plenković
- Preceded by: Davor Ivo Stier
- Succeeded by: Davor Božinović

Minister of Foreign and European Affairs
- In office 19 June 2017 – 19 July 2019
- Prime Minister: Andrej Plenković
- Preceded by: Davor Ivo Stier
- Succeeded by: Gordan Grlić-Radman

President of the Committee of Ministers of the Council of Europe
- In office 18 May 2018 – 21 November 2018
- Preceded by: Anders Samuelsen
- Succeeded by: Timo Soini

Personal details
- Born: 9 April 1963 (age 63) Mostar, PR Bosnia and Herzegovina, FPR Yugoslavia (modern Bosnia and Herzegovina)
- Party: Croatian Democratic Union
- Education: University of Zagreb; College of Europe

Marija Pejčinović Burić (pronounced [mǎrija pejtʃǐːnovitɕ bûːritɕ]; born 9 April 1963) is a Croatian politician of the centre-right Croatian Democratic Union party who served as Minister of Foreign and European Affairs and First Deputy Prime Minister of Croatia from 2017 to 2019. She was the third woman to hold the post of foreign minister, following Kolinda Grabar-Kitarović and Vesna Pusić. Pejčinović Burić previously served as a Member of Parliament during its Sixth Assembly (2008–2011), representing the 6th electoral district.

On 26 June 2019, she was elected as the 14th Secretary General of the Council of Europe, defeating Belgium's foreign minister Didier Reynders by 159 votes to 105. Pejčinović Burić's term began on 18 September 2019 and concluded on 18 September 2024, when she was succeeded by former Swiss President and Interior Minister, Alain Berset.

== Education and early career ==
Pejčinović Burić graduated in Economics from the University of Zagreb in 1985.

After graduating, Pejčinović Burić worked as a trade expert associate for Končar Inženjering in Zagreb between 1988 and 1991. In 1991, she was appointed Secretary General of the Europe House Zagreb by her boyfriend Ljubomir Čučić (at a time secretary general of the EuropeanMovement Croatia), and later Deputy Secretary General of the European Movement Croatia. In 1994, she obtained a Master of Science in European Studies from the College of Europe (campus Natolin), after which she went back to work for Končar Inženjering. In 1997, she was appointed director of corporate communications for the Zagreb-based pharma company Pliva.

== Political career ==
=== Career in the public sector ===
In 2000, Pejčinović Burić was appointed Assistant Minister at Croatia's Ministry of European Integration. In 2001 she was included in the negotiating team for the EU-Croatia Stabilisation and Association Agreement. From 2003 onwards she worked as lecturer on European integration at the seminars of the Croatian Diplomatic Academy.

In 2004, Pejčinović Burić was appointed State Secretary at the Ministry of European Integration and the following year as State Secretary for European Integration at the Ministry of Foreign Affairs and European Integration, both under the leadership of minister Miomir Žužul in the government of Prime Minister Ivo Sanader. She served as National Coordinator for Instrument for Structural Policies for Pre-Accession (ISPA) programs (2004-2006), National Coordinator for Assistance Programmes and Co-operation with the EU as well as member of the working group on the free movement of capital of Croatia's EU accession negotiations (2005-2006). From 2006 Pejčinović Burić was member of Croatia's EU accession negotiations team, and negotiator for the acquis chapters on External Relations, Foreign, Security and Defence Policy, Institutions and Other Issues, as well as chairperson for Croatia in the EU-Croatia Stabilisation and Association Committee and chairperson of the Croatia - Baden-Württemberg Mixed Commission (2006-2008).

=== Member of Parliament, 2008–2011 ===
In 2008, Pejčinović Burić was elected to the Parliament of Croatia for the centre-right Croatian Democratic Union (HDZ) party, representing the 6th electoral district. She held the parliamentary seat until the 2011 elections. During her time in parliament, she served on the Committee on European Integration and the Committee on Foreign Affairs. In addition to her committee assignments, she was a member of the Croatian delegation to the Parliamentary Assembly of the Council of Europe and chaired the Croatian – USA Parliamentary Friendship Group.

From 2012 until 2013, Pejčinović Burić lectured on the Lisbon Treaty at the seminars of Croatia's State School for Public Administration. From 2013, she worked for a few years as private consultant on EU, the United Nations Development Programme (UNDP) and bilaterally funded projects in the candidate and potential candidate countries, as well as in European Neighbourhood countries. She also provided consultancies on European integration for the Government of Serbia.

On 17 November 2016, Pejčinović Burić came back into service as State Secretary in the Ministry of Foreign and European Affairs, under the leadership of minister Davor Ivo Stier in the government of Prime Minister Andrej Plenković.

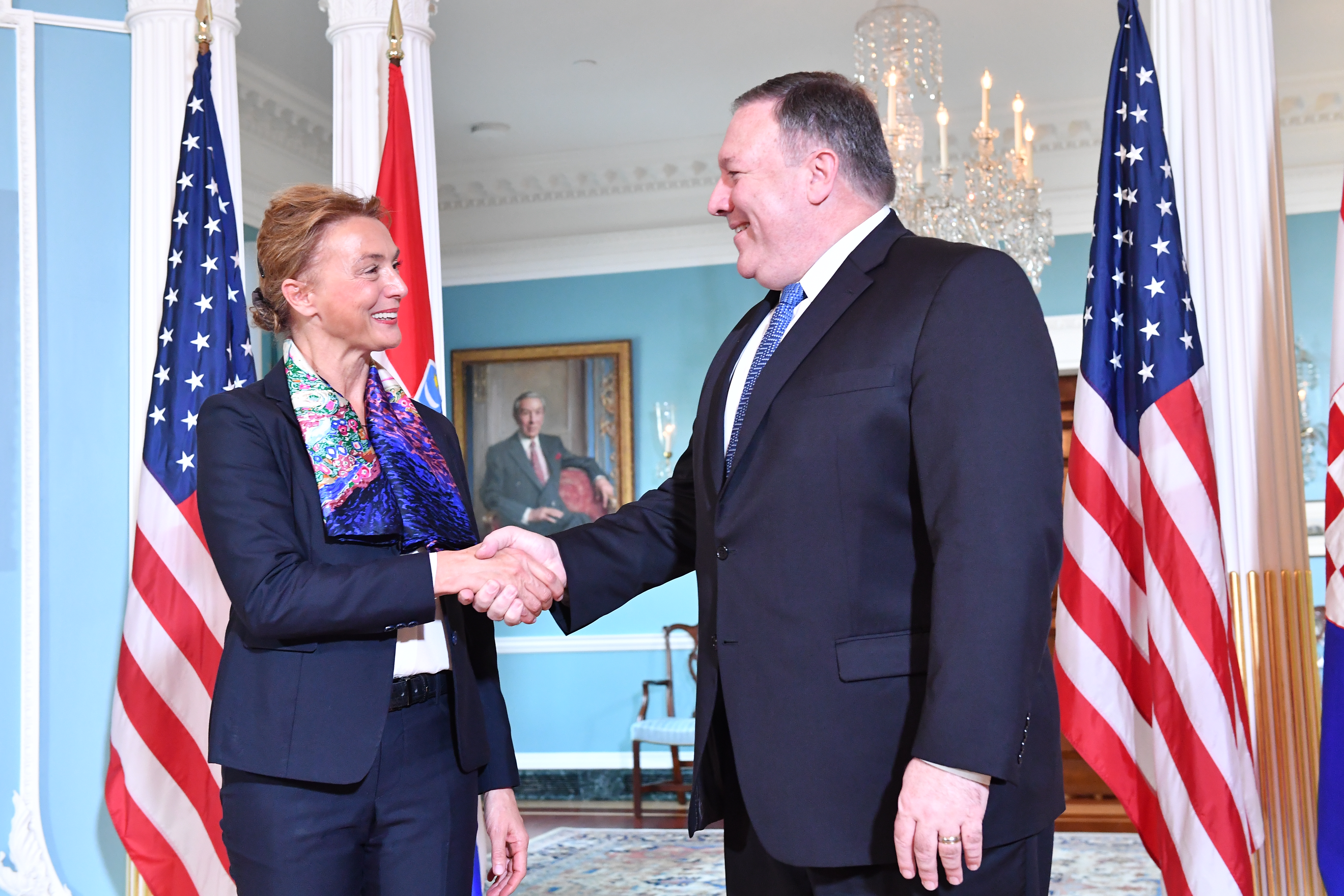
Burić meets with U.S. Secretary of State Michael R. Pompeo at the Department of State on September 12, 2018.

=== Minister of Foreign and European Affairs, 2017–2019 ===
In June 2017 Pejčinović Burić was appointed by Prime Minister Andrej Plenković as new Foreign Affairs Minister of Croatia, replacing Davor Ivo Stier after his resignation. In this capacity, she served as chairwoman of the Committee of Ministers of the Council of Europe for a six-month term in 2018. From 2017 until 2019, she also co-chaired the European People's Party (EPP) trade ministers meetings alongside Jyrki Katainen, vice-president of the European Commission.

In 2019, Pejčinović Burić announced her candidacy to succeed Thorbjørn Jagland as Secretary General of the Council of Europe.

== Secretary General of the Council of Europe ==
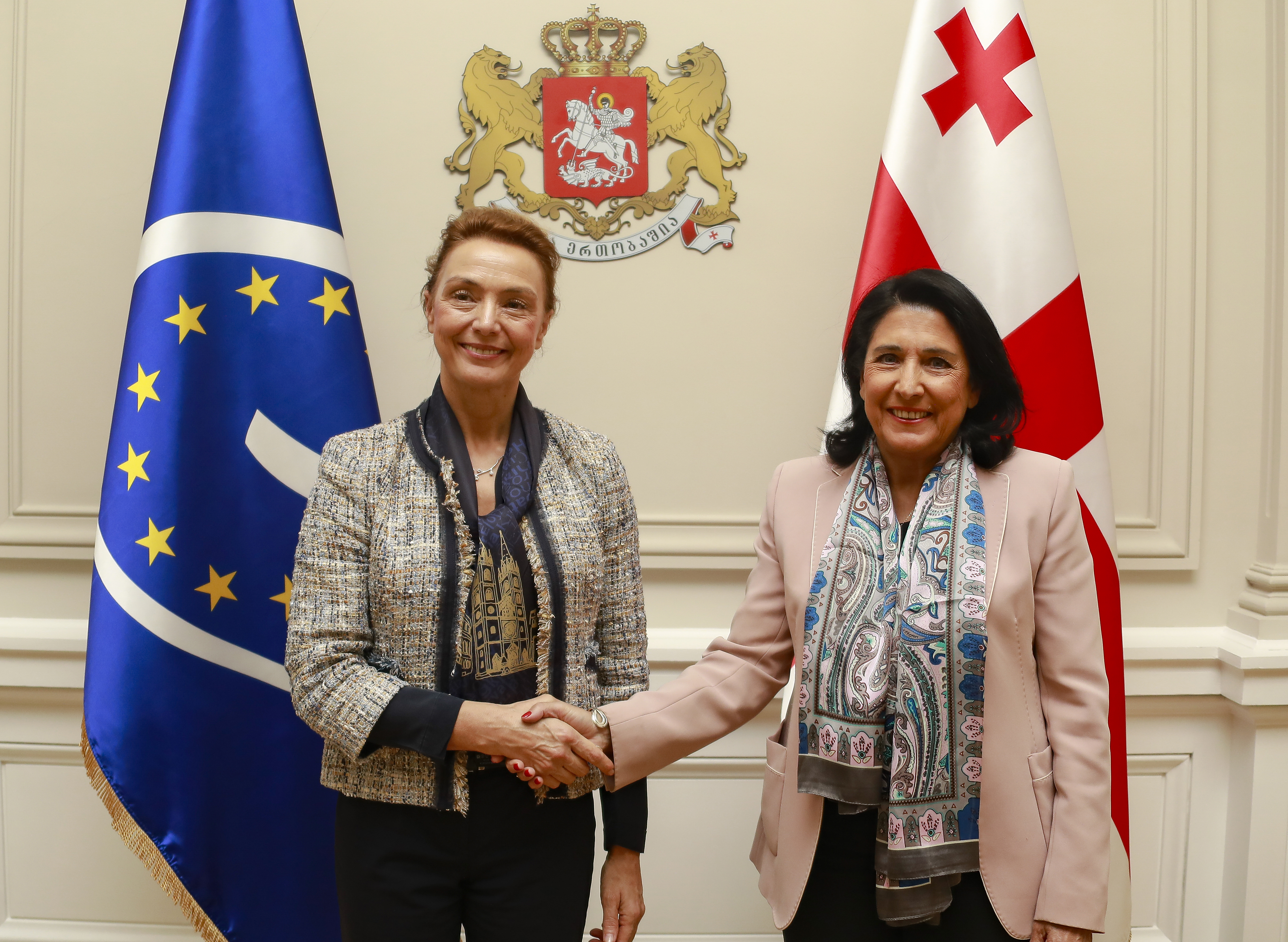
Pejčinović Burić with Georgian president Salome Zourabichvili in November 2019

On 26 June 2019, the Parliamentary Assembly of the Council of Europe voted to select the organization's 14th Secretary General, with the candidates being foreign minister Pejčinović Burić and her Belgian counterpart Didier Reynders. Pejčinović Burić went on to defeat Reynders by 159 votes to 105. She was formally sworn in on 18 September 2019.

Burić was present together with the President of Moldova Maia Sandu during the signing of the Council of Europe Action Plan for the Republic of Moldova 2021–2024 on 19 April 2021 at Strasbourg, France. She discussed with Sandu issues on human rights, politics and the COVID-19 pandemic in the country, with Burić expressing her support for Sandu's anti-corruption efforts.

== Other activities ==
- Centre for European Policy Studies (CEPS), Member of the Board of Directors (since 2016)

Political offices
Preceded by Davor Ivo Stier	First Deputy Prime Minister of Croatia; 2017–2019	Succeeded by Davor Božinović
Preceded by Davor Ivo Stier	Minister of Foreign and European Affairs; 2017–2019	Succeeded by Gordan Grlić-Radman
Diplomatic posts
Preceded by Thorbjørn Jagland	Secretary General of the Council of Europe; 2019–present	Incumbent
