= Distribution Transformer Monitor =

A Distribution Transformer Monitor (DTM) is a specialized hardware device that collects and measures information relative to electricity passing into and through a distribution transformer. The DTM is typically retrofitted onto pole top and pad mount transformers. A pole top (above ground) or pad mount (below ground) transformer commonly powers anywhere from 5-8 homes in the US and is the last voltage transition in stepping down voltage before it gets to the home or business. The conventional placement of Distributed Temperature Monitoring (DTM) devices is typically observed at the terminals of transformers. However, there are instances where these devices are directly affixed to the secondary power lines.

DTM apparatus commonly comprises precision-centric sensors, either of the non-piercing or piercing variety, in addition to communication modules integrated on board for seamless data transmission. Adequate provisions for power supply are also incorporated within the DTM setup. The captured data from the DTM unit is relayed to a central data collection engine and/or the established Supervisory Control and Data Acquisition (SCADA) / Meter Data Management (MDM) system, where pertinent information pertaining to the transformer is stored and made accessible to users. Often, analytical platforms come into play to decipher the data gleaned and reported by the DTM, thereby enhancing the comprehension of the acquired information.

== Overview ==
The Distribution Transformer Monitoring (DTM) system, often referred to as an intra-grid sensor, occupies a distinctive position within the distribution grid. It is capable of providing both real-time and historical data about the transformers it monitors. Beyond individual transformer monitoring, DTMs constitute crucial information access points within the grid's architecture. When deployed in a network across the distribution grid, these devices offer multiple data points. For electric utility operators, these data points can range from basic bellwether measurements to comprehensive insights into intra-grid conditions and performance, depending on the deployment density.

The strategy for deploying DTM devices varies according to the specific needs and objectives of the utility in question. Deployments may be surgical, meaning strategically limited to key areas of the grid, or they can be comprehensive, covering larger grid sections such as line segments, specific circuit feeders, or entire substations. The decision on the placement and density of DTM deployments is influenced by the targeted data requirements and operational goals of the respective electric utility.

Remote Over-The-Air (OTA) updates/upgrades are supported by certain DTM device offerings. This OTA capability, when supported, allows the operator to perform remote configuration and/or executable code (i.e., Firmware) updates of the DTM device(s) without the need for costly truck rolls or unit replacement. By supporting OTA Firmware updates/upgrades, providers can progressively broaden and deepen the suite of data points captured by the DTM device, making it reasonably future-proof, thus escalating value and relevance to the utility operator throughout the lifespan of the DTM device(s).

== Applications ==
DTM sensors transmit timely, accurate intra-grid readings for Voltage, Energy, Current, and Temperature, thus empowering a long list of derived performance and power quality understandings for operations personnel. These fundamental data points provide direct relevance to electric utility operators. Additionally, these data points can be extrapolated to reveal enhanced grid performance and asset health information. Given the physical location of the DTM within the heart of the distribution grid, in addition to the DTM reporting frequency capability, the versatility of this intra-grid sensor is expansive.

Utilities across the U.S. are beginning to turn to transformer technologies to improve distribution reliability and efficiency, as well as customer service and operating costs.

Examples of applications derived from direct and/or indirect information presented by the DTM include:

- Asset management and Condition monitoring (AMCM)
- Preventive Grid Asset Maintenance recognition
- Power Theft identification
- Demand response assistance
- Voltage optimization
- Outage notification/Restoration enhancement
- Distributed Energy Resource (DER) Monitoring (i.e., bi-directional energy monitoring, voltage impacts, current impacts, etc.)
- Transformer under-sizing/over-loading recognition (e.g., electric vehicle charging station impacts, hydroponic marijuana grow houses, etc.)
- Transformer under-sizing (i.e., unnecessary added energy loss, accelerated premature failure, etc.)
- Abnormal transformer voltage characteristics
- Transformer-related temperature monitoring
- Transformer life expectancy estimation
- Phase Imbalance recognition
- Populate Artificial Intelligence Platforms (foresee/forecast emerging intra-grid problems that human recognition cannot identify)
- Facilitate Strategic Battery Storage Location Efforts (i.e., leverage DER-induced Reverse Energy monitoring to locate present and future battery placements)
- Identify Geographic Information System (GIS) Mapping errors

== Health Concerns ==
Given the physical deployment position of the DTM (i.e., on the distribution transformer), there are no known health concerns related to this family of intra-grid sensors. DTM devices are created with user/installer safety in mind and otherwise bear no known measurable environmental impact.

== Business case justification ==
Utility spending on asset management and grid monitoring technology is to hit almost $50 billion by 2023, according to a new study from Navigant Research. Given the pioneering stage of the DTM technology, significant business case information is limited in availability for public review. Arguments against DTM deployment commonly assert that the secondary transformer value of $1000.00 to $2000.00 US (average) does not justify applying a retrofit DTM to monitor the transformer assets’ performance. However, the DTM value is based upon a combination of features/benefits that include not only the transformer condition monitoring importance, but also a series of data visibility and reconciliation features from within the heart of the distribution grid that is otherwise unavailable to the electric operator (see Applications).

In essence, while the Advanced Metering Infrastructure (AMI) or smart meter providers supply a series of data points to utilities, the DTM offers another dimension of real-time and historical data access for the grid operator and is capable of detecting information that AMI assets cannot capture and/or report with the necessary frequency to the operator. Each utility must evaluate, among other things, their unique grid management needs, their levels of unidentifiable losses that can be remediated/mitigated by DTM deployment, their Demand Response savings potential through Volt/VAR and conservation voltage reduction (CVR) related practices supported by DTM devices, and their need for real-time and/or historic data from within the heart of the distribution grid when formulating their business case justification. Investment decisions relating to DTM deployments involve a collection of monetary benefits that include savings for the utility through decreased operations costs, reduced power outages, lessened power outage durations, reduced peak demand costs, and recoverable power theft losses; and indirect financial benefits associated with improved power delivery and quality to rate payers, reduced truck rolls which lessen service costs in addition to yielding decreased environmental impacts, improvement of the utility's Key Performance Indicators (e.g., SAIDI, SAIFI, CAIDI, etc.), and improved stakeholder/shareholder value through enhanced bottom line fiscal performance by the utility.

To date, smart grid providers have presented electric utility operators with management and control tools for substations, and have introduced Advanced Metering Infrastructure (AMI, or smart meters) to improve data access at the beginning and endpoints within the distribution grid. However, the expansive and most vulnerable segment of the grid remains the section between substations and endpoint meters—comprising over 6 million line miles (US grid), and 40+ million distribution transformers (US grid) -- which is now collectively coined the "heart of the grid".

Presently, the “heart of the grid” area is somewhat devoid of a sufficient density of versatile, cost-effective sensors, thereby leaving operators with limited visibility into this critical area. To further evolve from a traditional reactionary management and problem resolution state within the “heart of the grid” space, to a more proactive posture that is congruent with the purpose and value of a ‘smart grid’, the emergence of the DTM is timely. While efforts have been made to leverage substation and endpoint meter data, along with supporting algorithms to speculate and postulate occurrences and needs within the “heart of the grid”, it is evident that grid operators require precision-accurate, timely information from within this expansive segment of the grid in order to proactively and efficiently manage its performance. The need to effectively combine all three critical points of measure (i.e., substations, endpoint meters, and DTM data from within the “heart of the grid”) may be collectively required to advance a comprehensive smart grid experience.

Why Distribution Transformer Monitors are fundamental for creating Grid Modernization—Achieving valuable results that Advanced Meter Infrastructure cannot reliably address:

1. Advanced Metering Infrastructure (AMI), Automated Meter Reading (AMR), and/or Manual Meter reads accurately and reliably represent endpoint data only. If any power is tapped before the endpoint meter (i.e., pre-meter tapping), accurate detection of this power diversion is difficult or nearly impossible without the use of a reconciliation point upstream—preferably at the distribution transformer. By accurately capturing unique data at the distribution transformer, DTM devices provide necessary reconciliation points between the substation and endpoint meters, thus enabling utility operators to effectively detect power diversion occurring in front of the endpoint meter. Without a reliable reconciliation point at the distribution transformer, the utility operator's power theft detection system remains porous, inefficient, and unreliable.
2. If AMI alone was a complete solution for diversion detection/identification, then AMI-installed utilities would seldom experience more than 1-3% loss from otherwise unavoidable technical losses. According to the United States Energy Information Administration (US EIA) most power distribution utilities report annual energy losses of nearly 5% or more. DTM devices and associated Data Analytics have the functionality to allow the utility operators to quickly identify intra-grid anomalies. AMI is a component in the diversion detection and solution process, but without a reliable reconciliation point at the distribution transformer, the detection system remains porous and inefficient. Many utilities, even those with AMI, actually suffer from the necessary availability of timely, granular, accurate intra-grid information that is necessary for improved energy loss detection, and enhanced Grid Modernization.
3. Energy measurements at the distribution transformer allow for ongoing validation of the AMI meters to ensure accurate meter performance, and to reveal improper metering issues within the distribution grid.
4. If customer meters yield "reasonable consumption readings" whether through AMI, AMR, or Manual meter reads, they will likely go without being investigated. But, when a DTM is deployed upstream, it records power consumption disparity for the entire downstream segment that is serviced by each respective transformer. This allows operators to locate less-obvious, but still costly power diversion instances.
5. For prosecution purposes, the evidence presented by a DTM in addition to AMI, AMR or Manual Reads is superior to having only meter reading data, whenever diversion is discovered, and remediation and/or prosecution is sought.
6. The DTM allows for enhanced desktop surveillance for power theft, thereby helping to keep utility personnel safe from the dangers of exploratory field efforts to locate potential power diversion occurrences. Using the DTM, operators can pinpoint losses from their desks, and dispatch the proper personnel (possibly even law enforcement) to address each particular situation.
7. With AMI or AMR deployed, utility meter-reader personnel are no longer visiting their customer's property; thus operators no longer have "eyes in the field" to spot nefarious behaviors. The DTM provides a cost-effective, non-invasive, reliable source for much-needed visibility into the grid.
8. DTM's offer valuable outage detection alerts via last-gasp reporting capability, thereby helping to pinpoint outage locations for utility operators, and accelerating power restoration for customers.
9. Transformer loading/overloading information is superior when captured by the DTM (vs. the projected or algorithmic loading estimations produced via accumulated AMI or AMR statistics). In addition, the DTM accurately and reliably captures other metrics related to transformer health and intra-grid conditions; such as but not limited to temperature data, percentage of rated load, duration of actual load, voltage, and current information, etc....
10. The DTM allows for the detection, quantification, and location of additional costly intra-grid losses occurring between the transformer and the endpoint meters (e.g., certain technical losses, and non-technical losses), such as but not limited to the ability to identify poorly functioning and/or poorly calibrated endpoint meters.
11. The DTM enables operators to accurately quantify the amount of Distributed Energy Resource (DER) inspired Reverse Energy being passed into the grid at the distribution transformer level. This is critical as Reverse Energy can adversely impact intra-grid voltages, and unplanned loading/overloading, which collectively or individually can result in grid safety and reliability risks.
12. The DTM uniquely enables the identification of unplanned grid-edge loading/overloading created by Electric Vehicle (EV) charging stations, Cryptocurrency mining, Legalized Hydroponic marijuana grow operations, ongoing power theft, etc. The transformer-related loading/overloading impacts associated with such grid-edge activities (primarily occurring in the residential sectors) is commonly unknown by operators (i.e., operators typically do not know where, when, or how much-unplanned loading/overloading is created by most grid-edge activities). This reality presents serious grid Reliability, Resilience, and Fire/Wildfire risks for all stakeholders.
13. Although AMI deployment has been advancing in many markets, Power Theft is typically increasing in spite of this smart meter deployment effort. Since AMI or AMR installations typically result in no utility personnel visiting customer locations following installation, power thieves know they can perform pre-meter taps, and likely steal power indefinitely without fear of utility detection. Increasing power theft cost (while AMI deployment continues) is further validation of the importance of DTM technology being leveraged by operators as a critical intra-grid reconciliation point, thereby helping to identify costly power theft occurrences.
14. Operators now have to contend with instances where endpoint meters are being stolen from locations or jurisdictions, and then are being installed at unauthorized locations by perpetrators. Endpoint meters may be swapped out in this manner on either a temporary basis or a permanent basis. This unauthorized practice results in inaccurate meter data being reported to the utility, which may result in added losses, and it results in inaccurate loading/overloading views regarding the upstream Distribution Transformer(s).
15. Commonly, the Geographic Information System (GIS) mapping of utility assets is antiquated, due to perpetual changes occurring within the distribution grid. Because of the antiquated GIS data, AMI, AMR, or Manual Read endpoint meter association to upstream transformers is likely to be inaccurate. With just one endpoint meter being inaccurately assigned in the GIS mapping to the wrong upstream transformer, all endpoint meter information (AMI or otherwise) becomes unreliably accurate regarding the associated upstream transformer(s). Thus, operators cannot reliably predict or know the actual loading/overloading, voltage, and/or current conditions regarding the upstream transformer. This is another reason that accurate, reliable transformer information provided by the DTM is valuable to operators.
16. DTM devices provide Automated Alert messages to operators. This feature creates a "Hands-Free" Grid Watchdog environment where operators are not required to expend large amounts of money to consistently monitor intra-grid conditions. Rather, the DTM can be programmed/re-programmed on the fly, each device individually re-programmable, thus allowing operators to focus on multiple points of interest throughout the lifespan of the DTM devices. Automated Alerts are typically created when the DTM devices detect high/low readings that our occurring outside of the utility's pre-programmed tolerances, and/or rapid outage notifications, as cited above. This feature automatically produces actionable information for operators, vs. trying to discern less reliable, less granular, less timely, and/or potentially antiquated endpoint meter data. Only with DTM can comprehensive intra-grid conditions be reliably and consistently detected, revealed, and reported to operators in a timely manner.
17. DTM device readings can “fill in the blanks” whenever an AMI meter in a group of meters on the same transformer fails to report properly for any reason. Assuming there is no diversion, the DTM can provide the utility with the substantially accurate missing consumption information, helping to assure the customer can be billed more accurately vs. the typical estimation systems in use today.
18. DTM-coupled with AMI can verify/measure problems between the DT and Meter, such as voltage drops that could leave the home running below-rated voltages. An AMI meter will report the low voltage, but the DTM can verify whether the voltage supplied at the DT is operating nominally or not.
19. The DTM can be installed without a required power outage experienced by downstream customers. When compared to the concept of replacing an aged/failing/overloaded transformer with a new, or 'smart' transformer, the reality of a forced downstream power outage is imperative. But, by installing a DTM, operators can accurately understand the condition and the associated demand burdens being inflicted upon each DTM-monitored transformer. This will enable operators to reduce the quantity of transformers that may otherwise need to be replaced or prematurely fail. In essence, deploying DTM can create an "instant smart transformer" out of an existing standard transformer. And, this "instant smart transformer" can then act to proactively apprise operators of intra-grid conditions for a lesser cost than a new smart transformer installation will require, in addition to the fact that a DTM deployment does not require an outage for installation, but a new smart transformer would require a multi-hour power outage requirement.
20. DTM devices commonly have the ability to report key intra-grid information directly to the utility operator's existing SCADA, MDM, ADMS, ONS, etc. systems. This seamless transfer of unique intra-grid data is achieved via DNP3, FTP, CSV, and/or web services. Thus, the DTM can be seamlessly used to substantially improve the operator's intra-grid understandings, and the intra-grid data can be used to facilitate automated operations actions, based upon actual, reliable information that AMI (endpoint metering) cannot.
21. Using Over-The-Air (OTA) technology, DTM devices can be routinely upgraded as necessary, and/or as technology advancements unfold. This ability creates an ongoing 'future-proof' benefit whereby DTM capability can be expanded; thus alleviating the concern of the DTM devices becoming antiquated prior to their anticipated lifespan (e.g., commonly 10–15 years)
22. DTM devices typically have the flexibility to report intra-grid information via cellular or RF Mesh backhaul. Most cellular networks offer a more robust backhaul capability whereby maximum intra-grid information payload can be passed onto the operator. When using RF Mesh backhaul technology, less bandwidth is typically available than with cellular networks, thus reducing the data payload capability of the DTM devices. There are various cost/benefit decisions that are applicable to proper backhaul selection for each operator.
23. Given the unique, timely, granular, and accurate intra-grid information that is presented by DTM, meaningful value is provided to the Planning, Operations, and Budgeting departments within most utility operators. The result is a more reliable, more resilient, more cost-effective, and more energy-efficient grid operation being facilitated by DTM.

== See also ==
- Distribution Transformer
- Smart Grid
- Demand Response
- Distributed Generation
- SCADA (Supervisory Control And Data Acquisition)
- MDM (Meter Data Management)
- SAIDI (System Average Interruption Duration Index)
- SAIFI (System Average Interruption Frequency Index)
- CAIDI (Customer Average Interruption Duration Index)
- Electric Power Distribution
