= Gordan Grlić-Radman =

Croatian diplomat and politician (born 1958)

- Grlić-Radman in 2025

Minister of Foreign and European Affairs
- Incumbent
- Assumed office 19 July 2019
- Prime Minister: Andrej Plenković
- Preceded by: Marija Pejčinović Burić

Personal details
- Born: 6 June 1958 (age 68) Prisoje, PR Bosnia and Herzegovina, FPR Yugoslavia (modern Bosnia and Herzegovina)
- Party: Croatian Democratic Union
- Children: 3
- Education: University of Zagreb

Gordan Grlić-Radman (born 6 June 1958) is a Croatian diplomat and politician serving as Minister of Foreign and European Affairs since July 2019.

== Early life and education ==
Grlić-Radman was born in Prisoje near Tomislavgrad, PR Bosnia and Herzegovina, FPR Yugoslavia in 1958. He studied at the XIV Gymnasium in Zagreb until 1977 and got a bachelor's degree at the Faculty of Agriculture of the University of Zagreb in 1982.

In 1991, Grlić-Radman also completed a two-year degree at the Institut für Kaderschule management school in Bern, Switzerland. In 2002, he graduated in international relations from the Faculty of Political Science of the University of Zagreb, where he obtained a PhD in 2007 with a dissertation on "Neutrality and New European Security Architecture".

== Professional career ==
Grlić-Radman started his career in business, working in Switzerland for Melior-Haefliger AG from 1984 to 1991. In those years he was active in the Croatian diaspora as president of the Croatian Cultural Community in Switzerland (1984–1988) and co-sponsor of the Croatian-Swiss Business Consult with Davor Pavuna.

From 1991 to 1992, Grlić-Radman worked as Business Secretary of the Faculty of Medicine in Zagreb (headed by Mate Granić, whom he befriended) and volunteered for the Office for Refugees and Displaced Persons of the Government of Croatia (working with diaspora) and for the Croatian Health Service (Humanitarian Aid).

== Diplomatic career ==
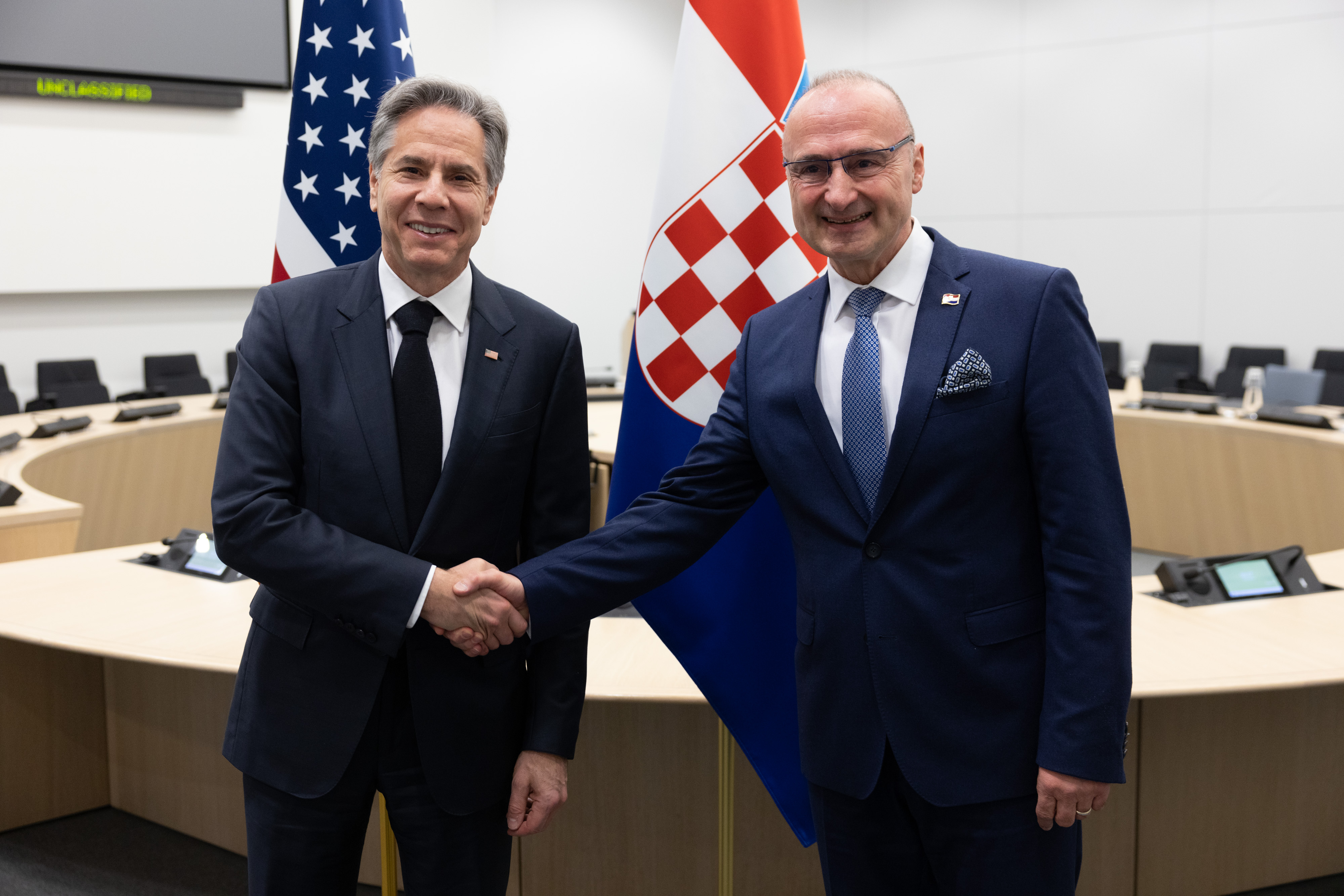
Grlić-Radman with U.S. Secretary of State Antony Blinken, 5 April 2023

In 1992 and later, Grlić-Radman helped set up the diplomatic and consular missions of newly independent Croatia in Bern, Geneva and Zürich. Grlić-Radman then served in the Croatian embassies to Bulgaria (1994–1996) and Hungary, headed by Zdenko Škrabalo (1996–1997). From 1997 to 2012, he worked with Mate Granić at the Croatian Foreign Ministry, among other things as Head of the Central European Department (2004–2009) and Secretary of the Danube Commission (2011–2014). From 2010 to 2012 he headed the Center for International Studies.

In 2012, Grlić-Radman was appointed by Davor Ivo Stier as the Ambassador to Hungary. In October 2017, he was appointed as Ambassador to Germany.

On 19 July 2019, Grlić-Radman was appointed to replace Marija Pejčinović Burić as Minister of Foreign and European Affairs in the Cabinet of Andrej Plenković.

On 2 November 2023, Grlić-Radman greeted German foreign minister Annalena Baerbock with a kiss at an EU ministers' meeting in Berlin. He was subsequently criticised in Croatian media, with women's rights activist Rada Boric calling his behavior "highly inappropriate". Grlić-Radman said his actions were a "warm, human approach to a colleague" but acknowledged that it was probably "an awkward moment" and apologised "to whoever took it that way."

On 24 February 2024, Grlić-Radman described Serbian President Aleksandar Vučić as a Russian “satellite” in the Balkans during an interview on N1, adding that Vucic must decide whether to side with Russia or the European Union “because it is impossible and uncomfortable sitting on two chairs at the same time.” Vučić denied the allegation, saying that Grlić-Radman "brutally interferes in the internal affairs of Serbia, but as usual he lies and insults the Serbian people and threatens its citizens.” The Serbian foreign ministry issued a note of protest saying that it expected Croatian officials to “refrain from statements that represent interference in the internal affairs of Serbia and will lead a policy of reconciliation and good-neighborly relations between the two states.”

== Personal life ==
Grlić-Radman is married and father of three children. He is a practising Roman Catholic. He speaks German, English, Bulgarian, and Hungarian but not fluently.

Political offices
Preceded by Marija Pejčinović Burić	Minister of Foreign and European Affairs; 2019–present	Incumbent
