= Miro Kovač =

Croatian diplomat and politician

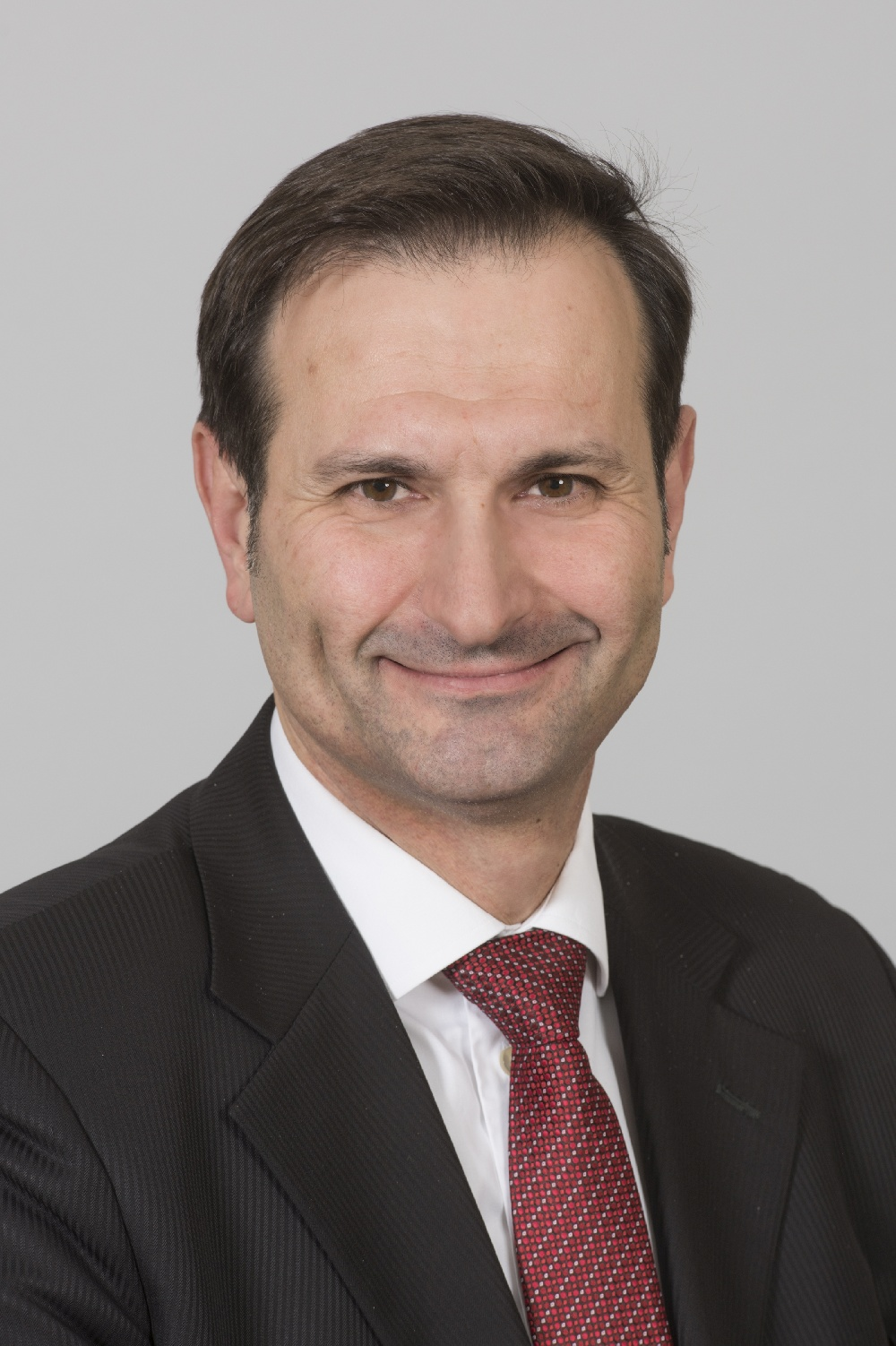

Minister of Foreign and European Affairs
- In office 22 January 2016 – 19 October 2016
- Prime Minister: Tihomir Orešković
- Preceded by: Vesna Pusić
- Succeeded by: Davor Ivo Stier

Personal details
- Born: 20 September 1968 (age 58) Split, SR Croatia, SFR Yugoslavia (modern Croatia)
- Party: Croatian Democratic Union
- Children: 3
- Education: University of Zagreb; University of Sorbonne Nouvelle Paris 3

Miro Kovač (born 20 September 1968) is a Croatian historian, diplomat and politician who served as the Minister of Foreign and European Affairs in the Cabinet of Tihomir Orešković from 22 January 2016 until 19 October 2016. He is member of the conservative Croatian Democratic Union (HDZ) party.

== Early life and education ==
Miro Kovač was born on 20 September 1968 in Split as the oldest of four children. He began his tertiary education at the University of Zagreb and completed it at the University of Sorbonne Nouvelle Paris 3 in Paris, where he earned his master's degree with a thesis on the national and European policies of the member states of the European Union, as well as a doctorate on the history of international relations with a thesis on the role of France in the creation of the Kingdom of Yugoslavia.

== Career ==
In 1995, Kovač began working in the Office of the President of Croatia, in the Department of Information where he worked until 1999 when he assumed the position of assistant adviser for Euro-Atlantic integration. He began his diplomatic career in 2001 as a counsellor at the Croatian Embassy in Brussels. In 2003, Kovač became a minister counsellor at the Croatian Embassy in Paris. When the Croatian Democratic Union (HDZ) came into power, after the 2003 elections, Kovač assumed the position of Assistant Minister of Foreign Affairs, and in 2005 the Head of Diplomatic Protocol of the Ministry of Foreign Affairs. In 2006, Kovač was appointed to the position of ambassador. From 2008 until 2013 he served as the Croatian Ambassador to Germany.

Kovač was appointed to the position of international Secretary of HDZ by its then-president Tomislav Karamarko in 2014. After his mandate in Germany expired, state officials had intended to appoint him the new Croatian Ambassador to Poland, but he refused and returned to Croatia in order to help HDZ in the upcoming presidential and parliamentary elections.

During the 2014–15 presidential elections he was the campaign manager for President Kolinda Grabar-Kitarović. His successor is Davor Ivo Stier, a former diplomat, MEP and international secretary of the HDZ.

== Personal life ==
Kovač is married with three children. He speaks Croatian, English, German, and French fluently and has a basic understanding of Italian and Dutch.

== Publications ==
- "La France, La création du royaume »Yougoslave« et la question Croate, 1914-1929", Bern, Berlin, Bruxelles, Frankfurt a. M., New York, Oxford, Vienna: Peter Lang, 2001., p. 398.
- "Raspadanje Austro-Ugarske i rađanje Kraljevine SHS u svjetlu francuske politike (od listopada do prosinca 1918.)" (Break up of the Austro-Hungarian Empire and birth of the Kingdom of Yugoslavia in the light of French politics (from October to December 1918)), Časopis za suvremenu povijest, no. 1, 2003., p. 141-172.
- "Francuska i hrvatsko pitanje, 1914.-1929." (France and Croatian question, 1914–1929), Zagreb: Dom i svijet, 2005., p. 363
- "La Croatie et l'Union Européenne, 1990-2004", in: Lukić, Renéo, La politique étrangère de la Croatie de son indépendance à nos jours, 1991–2006, Laval: Presses universitaires de l'Université de Laval, 2006, p. 316

Political offices
Preceded by Vesna Pusić	Minister of Foreign and European Affairs; 2016	Succeeded by Davor Ivo Stier
