= Pad-mounted transformer =

Ground mounted transformer

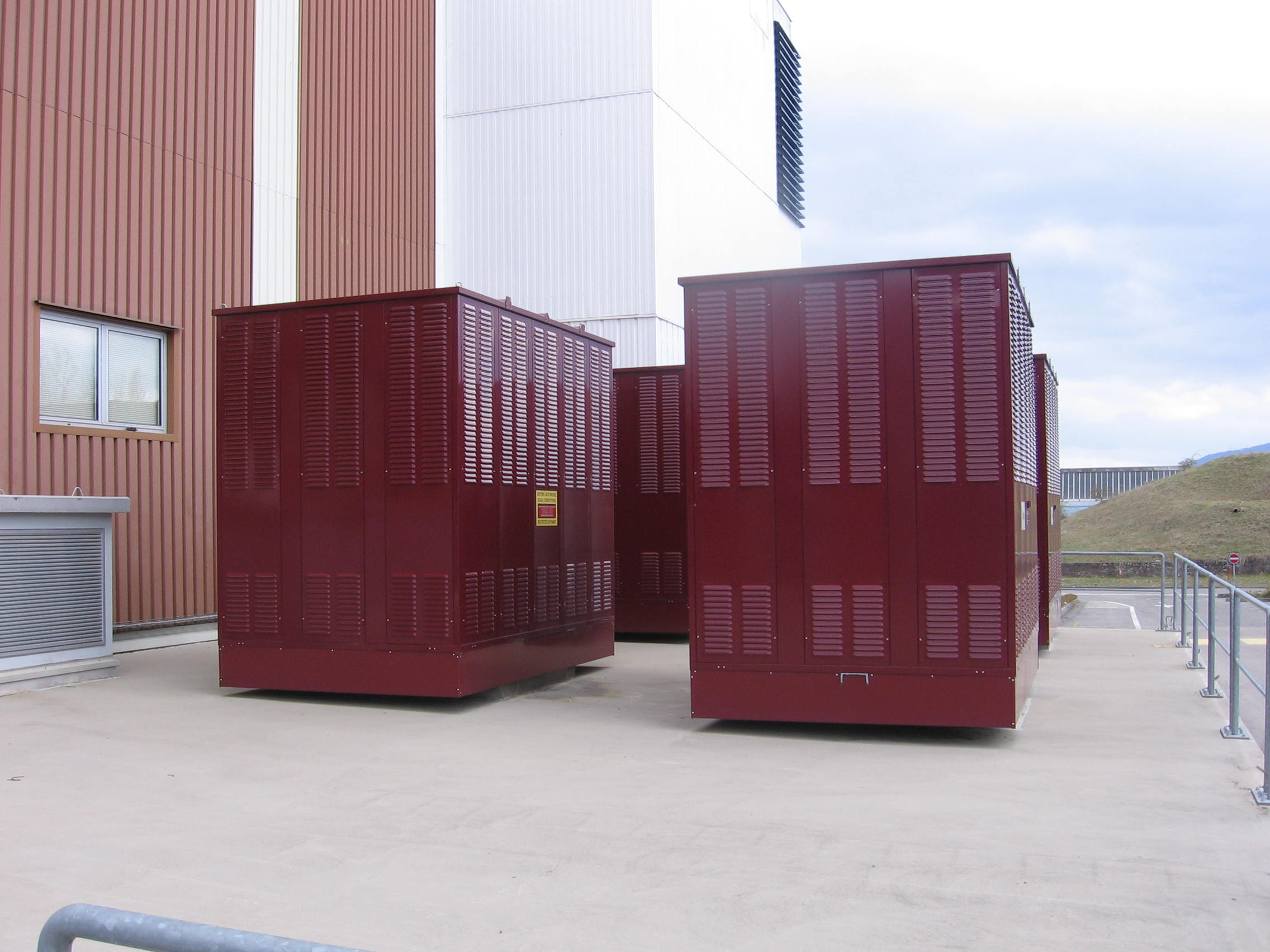
Large pad-mount transformers supplying power to a computer data center. No live wires are exposed.

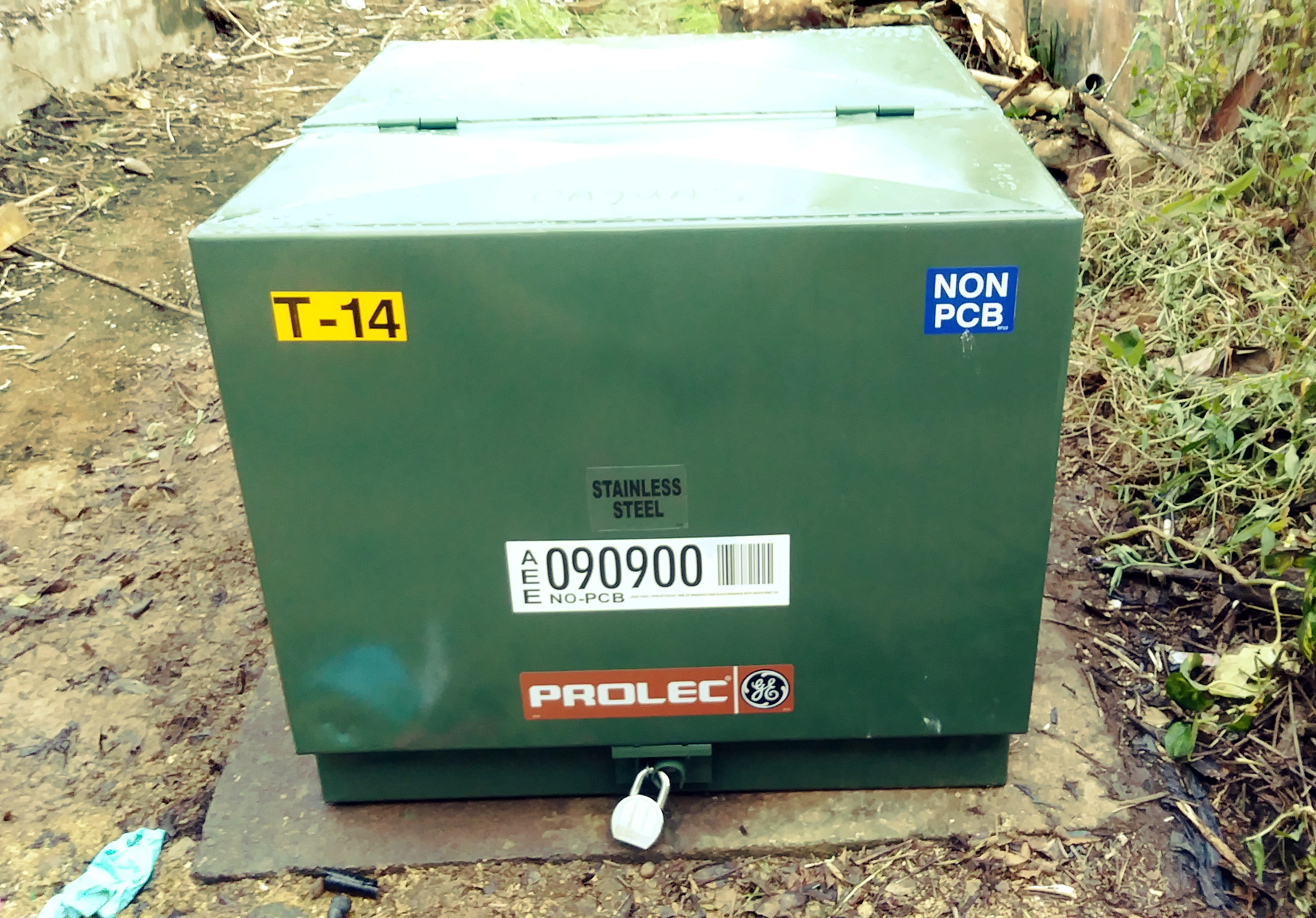
Padmounted transformers in Caguas, Puerto Rico.

A padmount or pad-mounted transformer is a ground-mounted electric power distribution transformer in a locked steel cabinet mounted on a concrete pad. Since all energized connection points are securely enclosed in a grounded metal housing, a padmount transformer can be installed in places that do not have room for a fenced enclosure. Padmount transformers are used with underground electric power distribution lines at service drops, to step down the primary voltage on the line to the lower secondary voltage supplied to utility customers. A single transformer may serve one large building or many homes.

Pad-mounted transformers are made in power ratings from around 15 to around 5000 kVA and often include built-in fuses and switches. Primary power cables may be connected with elbow connectors, which can be operated when energized using a hot stick and allows for flexibility in repair and maintenance.

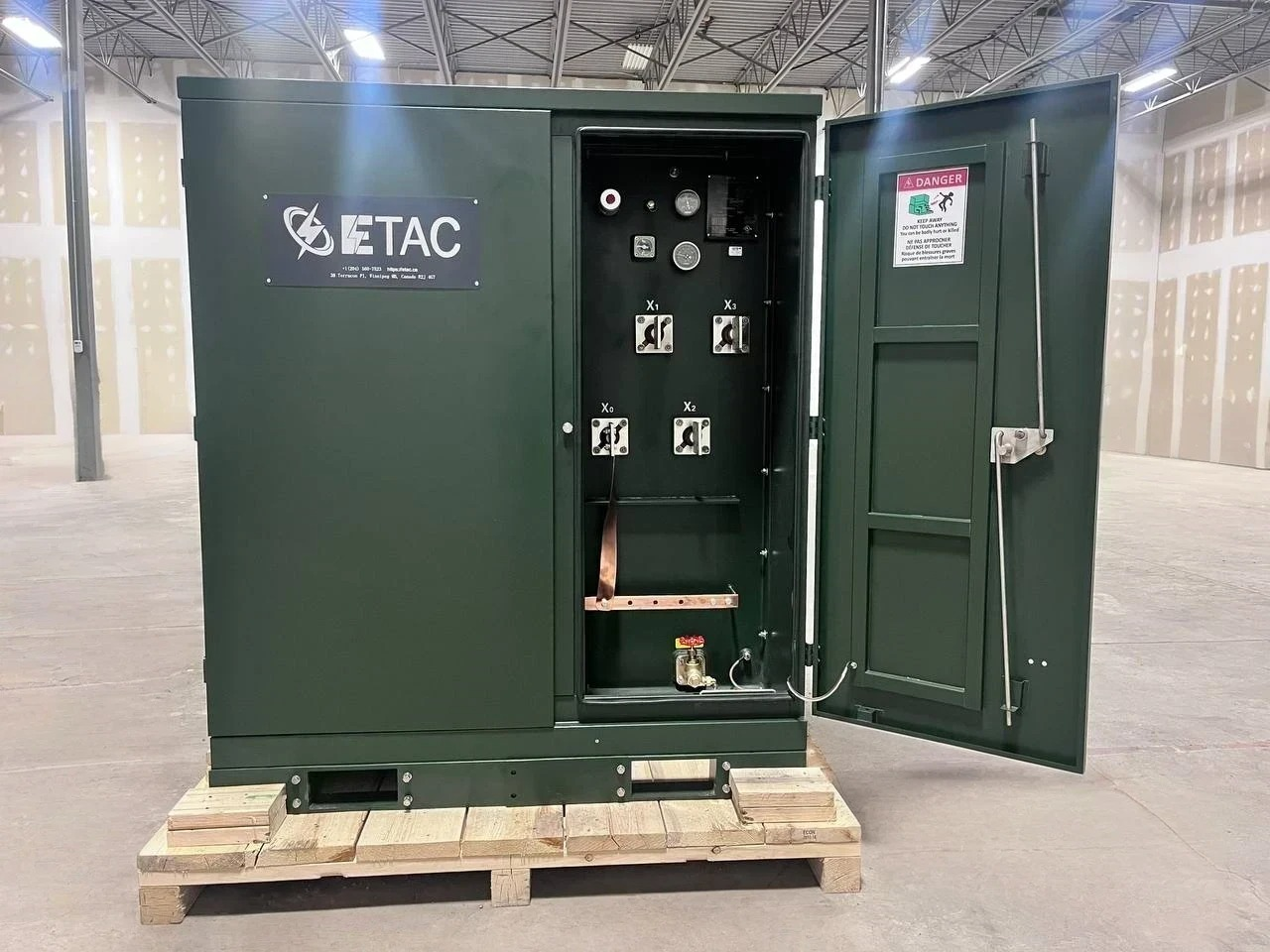
Pad-mounted distribution transformer with radial feed configuration. 500 kVA, 27.6 kV primary and 600Y/347 V secondary. Photographed in Winnipeg, Canada, 2025.

== Design ==
Pad-mount transformers are available in various electrical and mechanical configurations. Pad-mount transformers operate on medium-voltage distribution systems, up to about 35 kV. The low-voltage winding matches the customer requirement and may be single-phase or three-phase (pad-mounted transformers for commercial buildings use in the United States).

Pad-mount transformers are (nearly always) oil-filled units and so must be mounted outdoors only. The core and coils are enclosed in a steel oil-filled tank, with terminals for the transformer accessible in an adjacent lockable wiring cabinet. The wiring cabinet has high and low-voltage wiring compartments. High and low-voltage underground cables from below enter the terminal compartments directly. The wiring cabinet is bolted closed with one or more tamper resistant pent-head bolts to deter casual access. Sidewalls of the wiring cabinet have doors to expose the high and low voltage wiring compartments.

Pad-mount transformers have self-protecting fuses consisting of a bayonet mount fuse placed in a high voltage compartment, with a backup high energy current limiting fuse in series to protect against secondary faults and transformer overload. The bayonet mount fuse protects against secondary faults and transformer overload and is a field replaceable device. The backup current-limiting fuse operates only during transformer failure; therefore, it is not field replaceable. These transformers also serve the conventional low voltage fusing requirements.

The use of a polymeric cable and load break elbows enable switching and isolation to be carried out in the HV chamber in what is known as a "dead front" environment, i.e., all terminations are fully screened and watertight.

Single- and three-phase pad-mounted transformers are used in underground industrial and residential power distribution systems, where there is a need for safe, reliable, and aesthetically appealing transformer design. Their enclosed construction allows the installation of pad-mount transformers in public areas without protective fencing. Pad-mount transformers are usually located on the street easements and supply multiple households in residential areas.In North America, pad-mounted distribution transformers are typically designed in accordance with IEEE Std C57.12.34 or CSA C227.4, which define performance, enclosure integrity, switching configurations, and test procedures for medium-voltage underground applications.

While most traditional pad-mount transformers are fixed on a concrete 'pad,' today, small single-phase designs are also available with the transformer already mounted on a 'polypad' base to be mounted on hard ground, connected, and switched on.

== Standards ==
American National Standards Institute /Institute of Electrical and Electronics Engineers (ANSI/IEEE)

- ANSI C57.12.00 – Standard General Requirements for Liquid-Immersed Distribution, Power, and Regulating Transformers
- ANSI C57.12.22 – Standard for Transformers - Pad-Mounted, Compartmental-Type, Self-Cooled, Three-Phase Distribution Transformers with High-Voltage Bushings, 2500 kVA and Smaller: High Voltage, 34,500Grd/19,920 Volts, and Below; Low-Voltage, 480 Volts, and Below - Requirements
- ANSI C57.12.26 (Withdrawn) – Standard for Transformers-Pad-Mounted, Compartmental-Type, Self-Cooled, Three-Phase Distribution Transformers for Use with Separable Insulated High-Voltage Connectors, 34,500 Grd/19,920 Volts and Below; 2500 kVA and Smaller
- ANSI C57.12.28 – Standard for Switchgear and Transformers, Pad-Mounted Equipment – Enclosure Integrity

National Electrical Manufacturers Association (NEMA) Standards

- NEMA TR 1-1993 (R2000) – Transformers, Regulators and Reactors, Table 0-2 Audible Sound Levels for Liquid-Immersed Power Transformers.
- NEMA 260-1996 (2004) – Safety Labels for Pad-Mounted Switchgear and Transformers Sited in Public Areas
