= Končar – Engineering =

Končar – Engineering Ltd. for production and services
- Type: limited liability company
- Founded: 6 February 1991.
- Headquarters: Fallerovo šetalište 22, Zagreb, Croatia
- Owner: Končar – Electrical Industry Inc.
- Number of employees: 360
- Website: www.koncar-ket.hr

Končar – Engineering Ltd. for production and services (in Croatian: Končar – Inženjering d.o.o. za proizvodnju i usluge; abbreviated name KONČAR - KET) is a limited liability company based in Zagreb. Since its foundation in 1991, company has established itself as a respectable engineering company whose core activity is the construction and reconstruction of complex buildings and plants on a "turnkey" basis in the power industry, railway infrastructure, and automation and management.

== Products and services ==
- Construction and revitalization of Hydro Power Plants
- Electrical substation;
- Plants and equipment intended for Thermal power station;
- Railway Infrastructure
- Automation and control

== Organisation charter ==
- Electric power (Hydroelectric and thermal power plants, Transformer stations, Dispatch centers)
- Renewable energy sources (Solar power plants, Small hydropower plants, Cogeneration plants, Wind power plants)
- Railway infrastructure (Electric traction plants, signaling and safety systems)
- Automation and control (Automation, regulation, control and protection, Remote control systems, Electronic monitoring and telecommunications)

== References, buyers and export countries ==
The Company has been continuously present on the global market with:

- More than 100 hydro power plants, 50 thermal power plants and 100 diesel power plants in the world
- More than 300 transformer substations of 72.5 to 420 kV
- More than 3000 distribution transformer substations of up to 38 kV of various types
- More than 40 electric traction substations of 25 kV (50 Hz) and more than 40 sectionalising plants of 25 kV (50 Hz)
- Several reactive power compensation plants 25 kV, 1ph
- 14 micro-computer controlled level crossings
- More than 100 remote control systems
- More than 120 water pumping stations in Egypt, Iraq and Algeria
- Several industrial power generation plants
- More than 1000 vessels equipped with electrical equipment and complete electrical plants

Largest domestic buyers:

- HEP (CROATIAN POWER AUTHORITY), ZET (ZAGREB ELECTRIC TRAMCAR)
- HŽ (CROATIAN RAILWAYS), INA (CROATIAN OIL INDUSTRY), HAC (CROATIAN MOTORWAYS)

Recent exporting countries: Albania, Austria, Bosnia And Herzegovina, Canada, Colombia, Costa Rica, Egypt, France, Greece, Germany, Hungary, Iceland, India, Iraq, Kenya, Macedonia, Netherlands, Nigeria, Peru, Romania, Rwanda, Slovenia, Serbia, Sweden, Turkey, Zambia.
