= Distribution transformer =

Final stage in power distribution to users

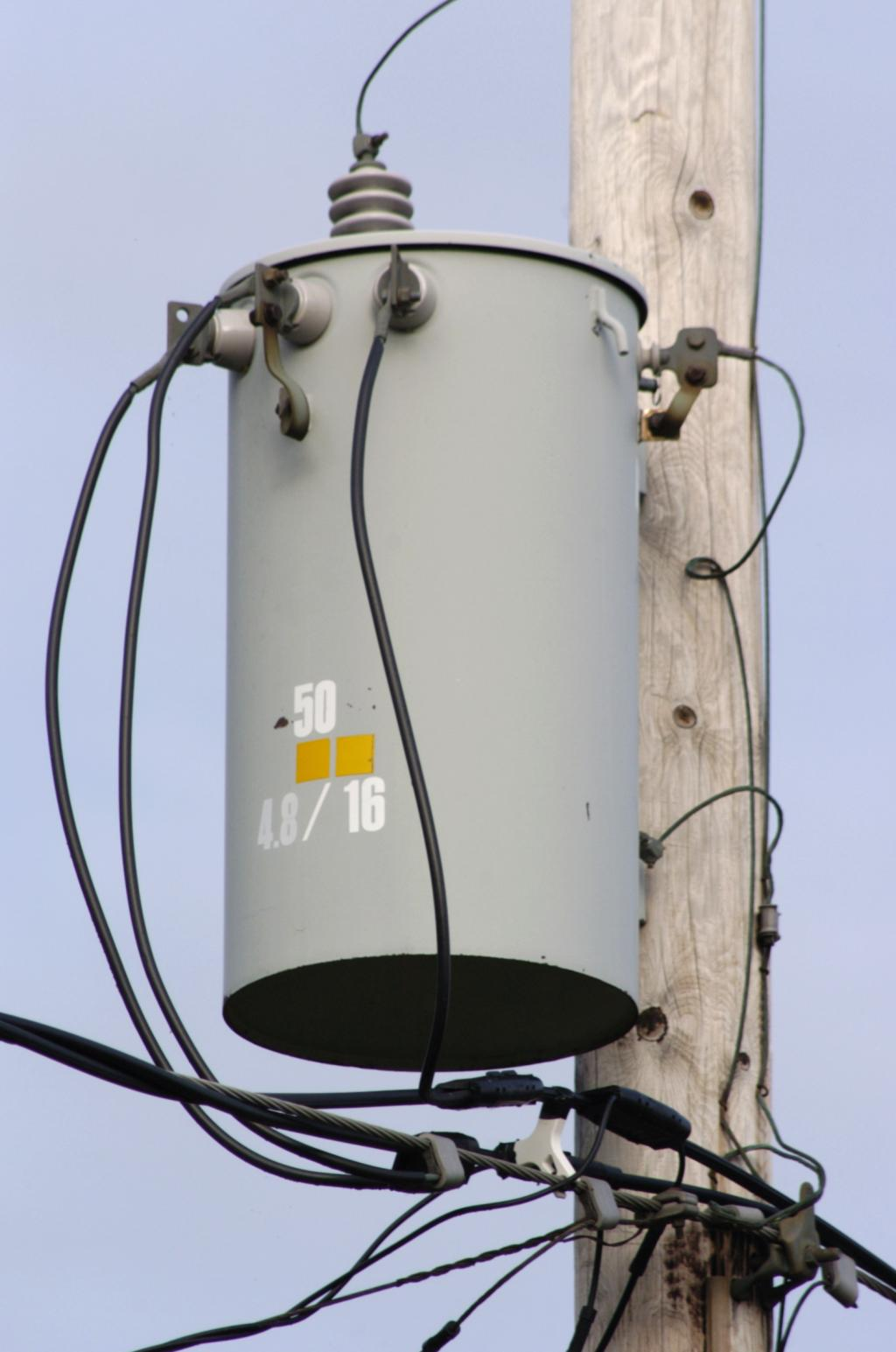
Single-phase distribution transformer in Canada

A distribution transformer or service transformer is a transformer that provides a final voltage reduction in the electric power distribution system, stepping down the voltage used in the distribution lines to the level used by the customer. The invention of a practical, efficient transformer made AC power distribution feasible; a system using distribution transformers was demonstrated as early as 1882.

If mounted on a utility pole, they are called pole-mount transformers. When placed either at ground level or underground, distribution transformers are mounted on concrete pads and locked in steel cases, thus known as distribution tap pad-mounted transformers.

Distribution transformers typically have ratings less than 200 kVA, although some national standards allow units up to 5000 kVA to be described as distribution transformers. Since distribution transformers are energized 24 hours a day (even when they don't carry any load), reducing iron losses is vital in their design. They usually don't operate at full load, so they are designed to have maximum efficiency at lower loads. To have better efficiency, voltage regulation in these transformers is kept to a minimum. Hence, they are designed to have small leakage reactance.

== Types ==
Distribution transformers are classified into different categories based on factors such as:

- Mounting location – pole, pad, underground vault
- Type of insulation – liquid-immersed or dry-type
- Number of phases – single-phase or three-phase
- Voltage class
- Basic impulse insulation level (BIL).

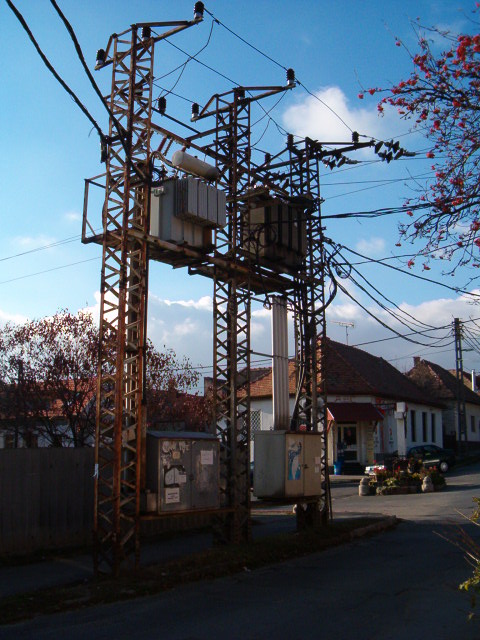
Two three-phase transformers in Hungary

== Use ==
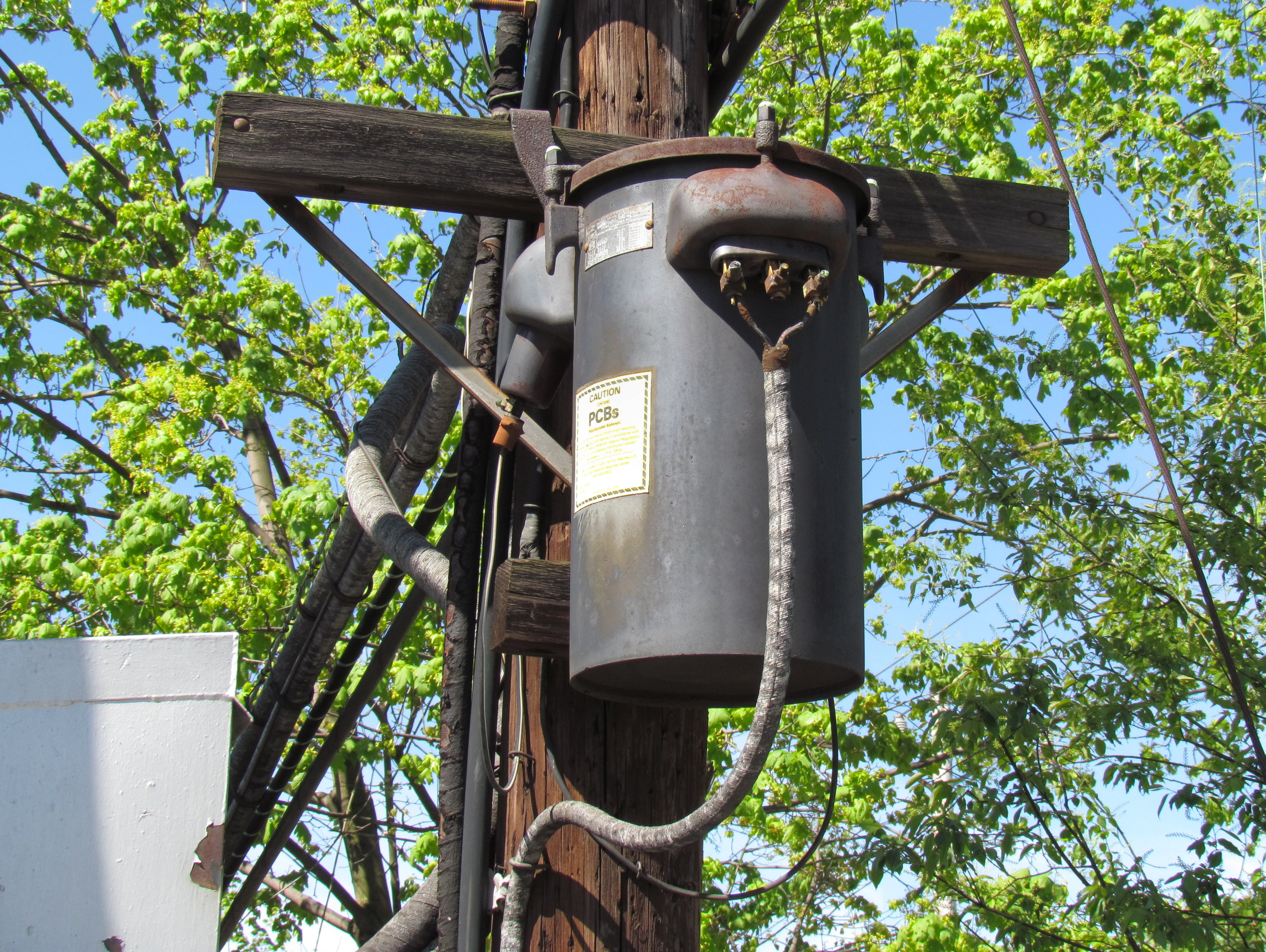
Railroad signal power supply transformer (CP-SLOPE interlocking) in west of Altoona with a warning label indicating that it contains PCBs.

Distribution transformers are normally located at a service drop, where wires run from a utility pole or underground power lines to a customer's premises. They are often used for the power supply of facilities outside settlements, such as isolated houses, farmyards, or pumping stations at voltages below 30 kV. Another application is the power supply of the overhead wire of railways electrified with AC. In this case, single-phase distribution transformers are used.

The number of customers fed by a single distribution transformer varies depending on the number of customers in an area. Several homes may be fed from a single transformer in urban areas; depending on the mains voltage, rural distribution may require one transformer per customer. A large commercial or industrial complex will have multiple distribution transformers. In urban areas and neighborhoods where primary distribution lines run underground, padmount transformers, and locked metal enclosures are mounted on a concrete pad. Many large buildings have electric service provided at primary distribution voltage. These buildings have customer-owned transformers in the basement for step-down purposes.

Distribution transformers are also found in wind farm power collection networks, where they step up power from each wind turbine to connect to a substation that may be several miles (kilometers) distant.

== Connections ==
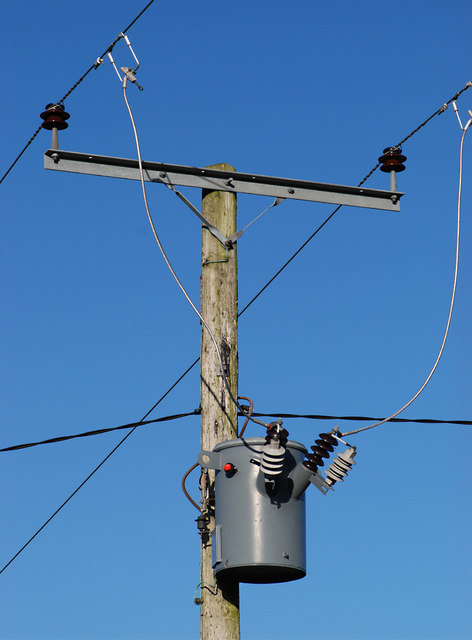
Phase-to-phase transformer in Britain

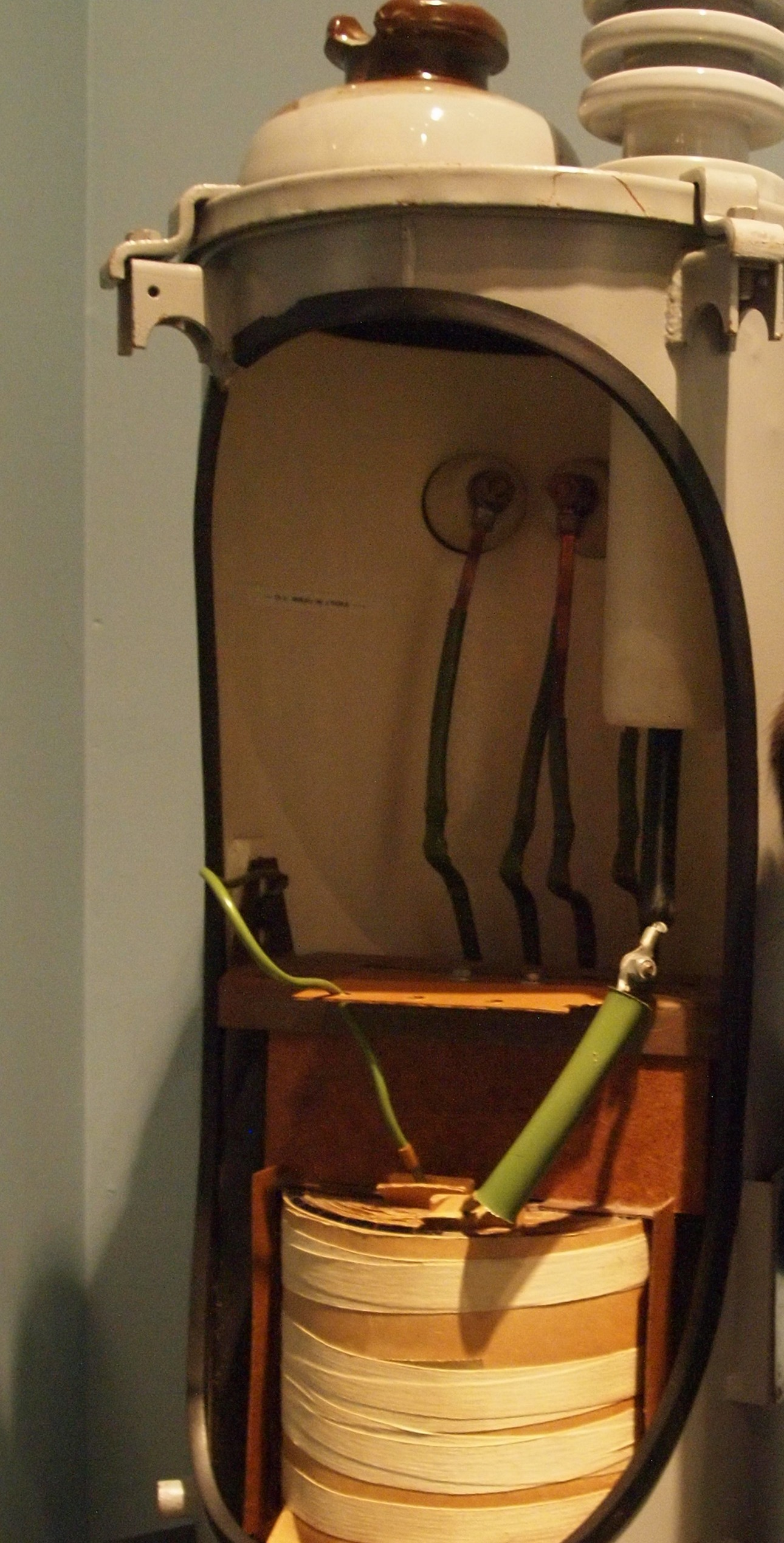
Primary line on the right toward the front and secondary lines in the back of this single-phase transformer

Both pole-mounted and pad-mounted transformers convert the overhead or underground distribution lines' high primary voltage to the lower secondary or utilization voltage inside the building. The primary distribution wires use the three-phase system. Main distribution lines always have three "hot" wires plus an optional neutral. In the North American system, where single-phase transformers connect to only one phase wire, smaller lateral lines branching off on side roads may include only one or two hot phase wires. When only one phase wire exists, a neutral will always be provided as a return path. Primaries provide power at the standard distribution voltages used in the area; these range from as low as 2.3 kV to about 35 kV depending on local distribution practice and standards, often 11 kV (50 Hz systems) and 13.8 kV (60 Hz systems) are used, but many other voltages are standard. For example, in the United States, the most common voltage is 12.47 kV, with a line-to-ground voltage of 7.2 kV. It has a 7.2 kV phase-to-neutral voltage, exactly 30 times the 240 V on the split-phase secondary side.

=== Primary ===
The high-voltage primary windings are brought out to bushings on the top of the case.

- Single-phase transformers, generally used in the North American system, are attached to the overhead distribution wires with two different types of connections:
  - Wye – A wye or phase-to-neutral transformer is used on a wye distribution circuit. A single-phase wye transformer usually has only one bushing on top, connected to one of the three primary phases. The other end of the primary winding is connected to the transformer case, which is connected to the neutral wire of the wye system and is also grounded. A wye distribution system is not preferred because the transformers present unbalanced loads on the line that cause currents in the neutral wire and then the ground. However, with a delta distribution system, the unbalanced loads can cause variations in the voltages on the 3-phase wires.
  - Delta – A delta or phase-to-phase transformer is used on a delta distribution circuit. A single-phase delta transformer has two bushings connected to two of the three primary wires, so the primary winding sees the phase-to-phase voltage; this avoids returning primary current through a neutral that must be solidly grounded to keep its voltage near earth's potential. Since the neutral is also provided to customers, this is a significant safety advantage in a dry area like California, where soil conductivity is low. The main disadvantage is higher cost, e.g., needing at least two insulated "hot" phase wires even on a branch circuit. Another minor disadvantage is that if only one of the primary phases is disconnected upstream, the downstream side will remain live as the transformers try to return current. It could be a hazard to line workers.
- Three-phase transformers, used for residential service in the European system, have three primary windings attached to all three primary phase wires. The windings are almost always connected in a wye configuration, with the ends connected and grounded.

The transformer is always connected to the primary distribution lines through protective fuses and disconnect switches. For pole-mounted transformers, this is usually a fused cutout. An electrical fault melts the fuse, and the device drops open to give a visual indication of trouble. Lineworkers can also manually open it while the line is energized using insulated hot sticks. In some cases, completely self-protected transformers are used, which have a circuit breaker built in, so a fused cutout isn't needed.

=== Secondary ===
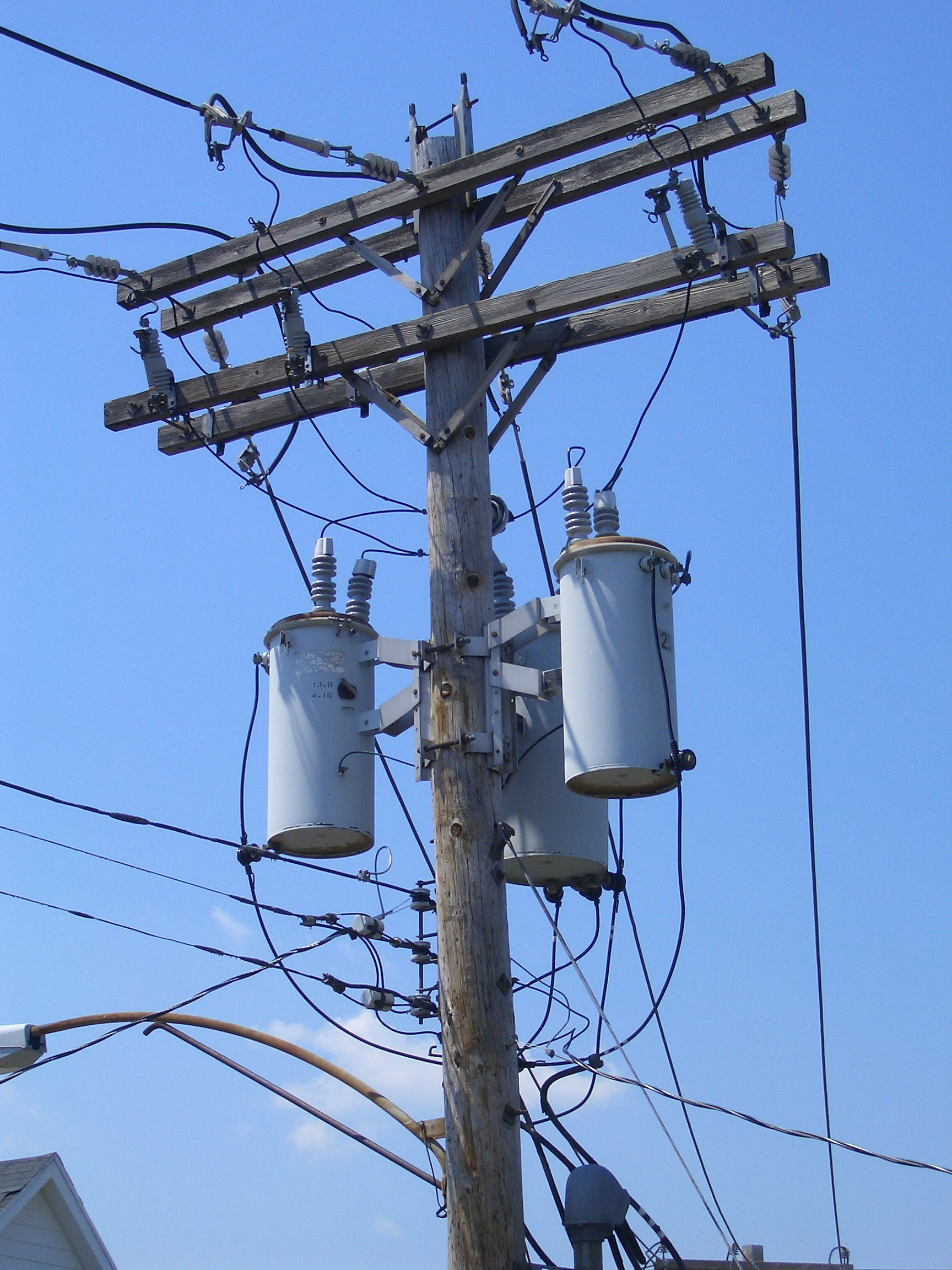
A "transformer bank", widely used in North America: three single-phase transformers connected to make a 3-phase transformer.

The low-voltage secondary windings are attached to three or four terminals on the transformer's side.

- In North American residences and small businesses, the secondary is often the split-phase 120/240-volt system. The 240 V secondary winding is center-tapped, and the center neutral wire is grounded, making the two end conductors "hot" compared to the center tap. These three wires run down the service drop to the building's electric meter and service panel. Connecting a load between the hot wire and the neutral gives 120 volts, which is used for lighting circuits. Connecting both hot wires gives 240 volts for heavy loads such as air conditioners, ovens, dryers, and electric vehicle charging stations. Two, single-phase transformers are sometimes attached to a single utility pole with their secondaries wired in parallel. This allows greater (single phase) capacity than could be obtained from either transformer alone.
- In Europe and other countries using its system, the secondary is often the three-phase 400Y/230 system. There are three 230 V secondary windings, each receiving power from a primary winding attached to one of the primary phases. One end of each secondary winding is connected to a neutral wire, which is grounded. The other end of the three secondary windings and the neutral are brought down the service drop to the service panel. 230 V loads are connected between any of the three-phase wires and the neutral. Because the phases are 120 degrees from each other, the voltage between any two phases is sqrt(3) * 230V = 400V, compared to the 2 * 120V = 240V in the North American split phase system. While three-phase power is almost unheard of in individual North American residences, it is common in Europe for heavy loads such as kitchen stoves, air conditioners, and electric vehicle chargers.

== Construction ==
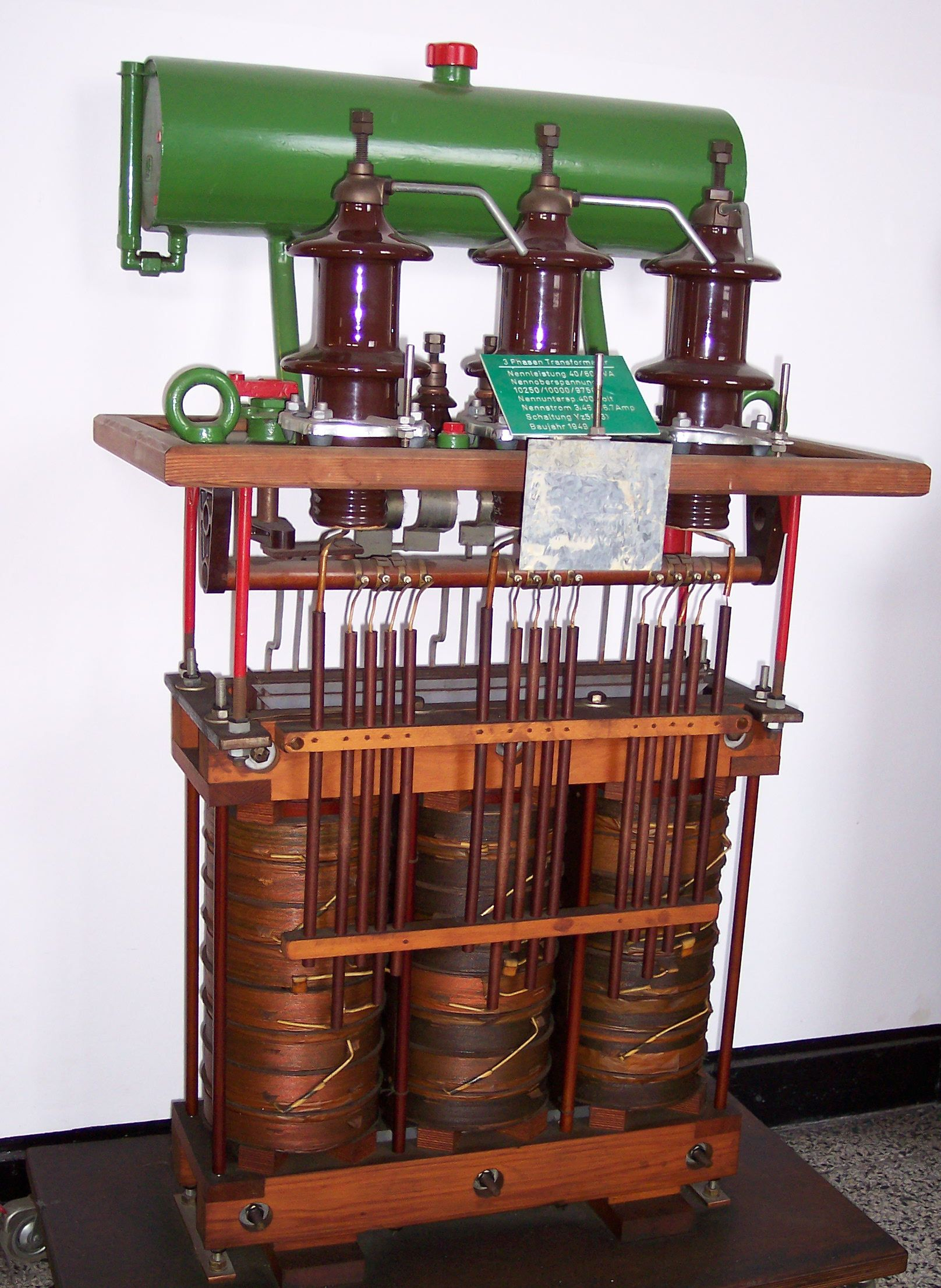
Oil-cooled three-phase distribution transformer, similar to one in above photo, with housing off, showing construction.

Distribution transformers consist of a magnetic core made from laminations of sheet silicon steel (transformer steel) stacked and either glued together with resin or banded together with steel straps, with the primary and secondary wire windings wrapped around them. This core construction is designed to reduce core losses and dissipation of magnetic energy as heat in the core, an economically important cause of power loss in utility grids. Two effects cause core losses: hysteresis loss in the steel and eddy currents. Silicon steel has low hysteresis loss, and the laminated construction prevents eddy currents from flowing in the core, which dissipates power in the resistance of the steel. The efficiency of typical distribution transformers is between about 98 and 99 percent. Where large numbers of transformers are made to standard designs, a wound C-shaped core is economical to manufacture. A steel strip is wrapped around a former, pressed into shape, and then cut into two C-shaped halves re-assembled on the copper windings.

The primary coils are wound from enamel-coated copper or aluminum wire, and the high-current, low-voltage secondaries are wound using a thick ribbon of aluminum or copper. The windings are insulated with resin-impregnated paper. The entire assembly is baked to cure the resin and then submerged in a powder-coated steel tank, which is then filled with transformer oil (or other insulating liquid), which is inert and non-conductive. The transformer oil cools and insulates the windings and protects them from moisture. The tank is temporarily evacuated during manufacture to remove any remaining moisture that would cause arcing and is sealed against the weather with a gasket at the top.

Formerly, distribution transformers for indoor use would be filled with a polychlorinated biphenyl (PCB) liquid. Because these chemicals persist in the environment and adversely affect on animals, they have been banned. Other fire-resistant liquids such as silicones are used where a liquid-filled transformer must be used indoors. Certain vegetable oils have been applied as transformer oil; these have the advantage of a high fire point and are completely biodegradable in the environment.

Pole-mounted transformers often include accessories such as surge arresters or protective fuse links. A self-protected transformer consists of an internal fuse and surge arrester; other transformers have these components mounted separately outside the tank. Pole-mounted transformers may have lugs allowing direct mounting to a pole or may be mounted on cross-arms bolted to the pole. Aerial transformers, larger than around 75 kVA, may be mounted on a platform supported by one or more poles. A three-phase service may use three identical transformers, one per phase.

Transformers engineered for below-grade applications may be designed for periodic submersion, particularly in areas with high water tables or flood risks.

Distribution transformers may include an off-load tap changer, which slightly adjusts the ratio between primary and secondary voltage to bring the customer's voltage within the desired range on long or heavily loaded lines.

Pad-mounted transformers have secure locked, bolted, and grounded metal enclosures to discourage unauthorized access to live internal parts. The enclosure may also include fuses, isolating switches, load-break bushings, and other accessories as described in technical standards. Pad-mounted transformers for distribution systems typically range from around 100 to 2000 kVA, although some larger units are also used.

== Placement ==
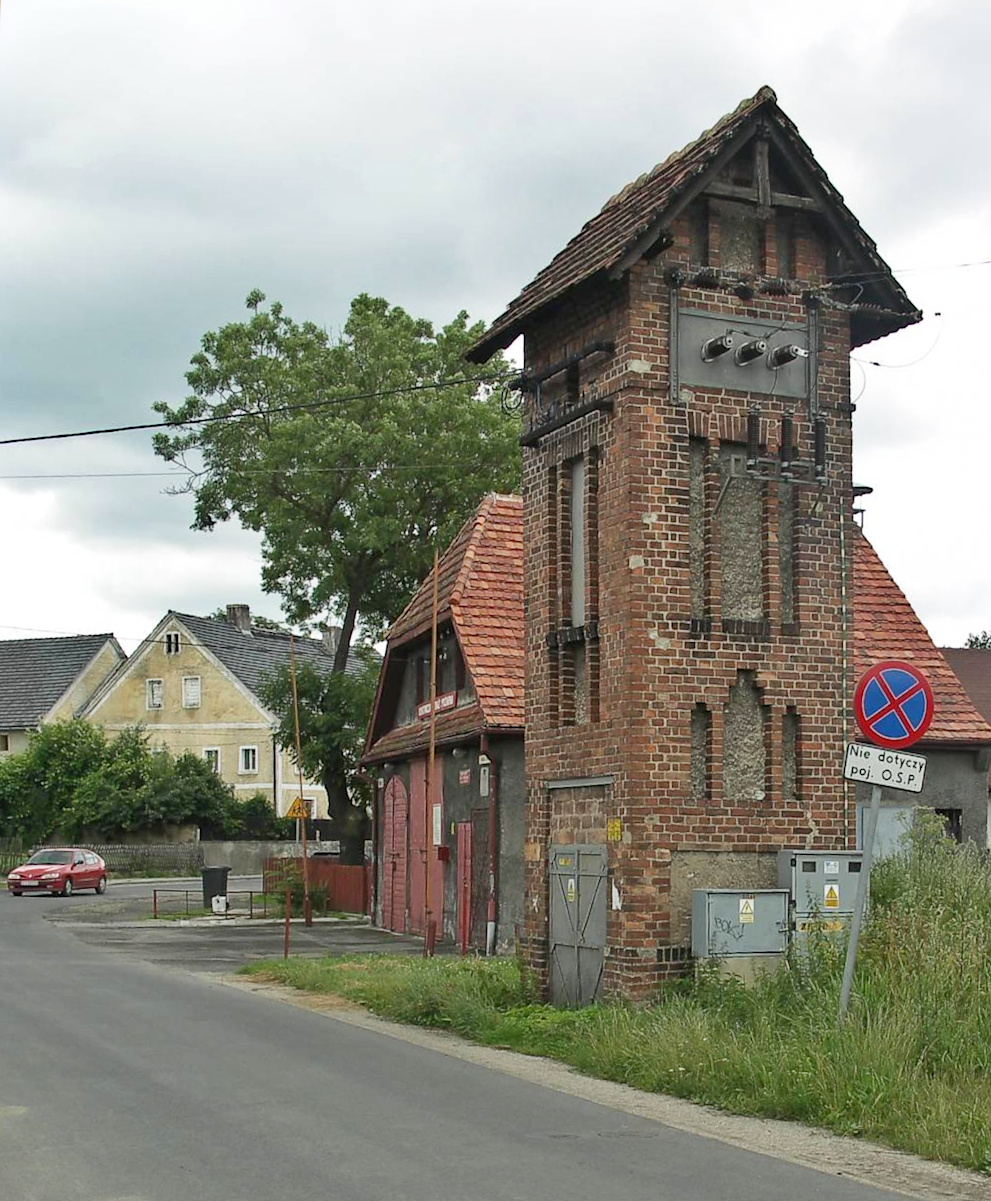
Distribution substations inside a small tower-like building are common in Europe. Near Jelenia Góra, Poland

In the United States, distribution transformers are often installed outdoors on wooden poles.

In Europe, it is most common to place them in buildings. If the feeding lines are overhead, these look like towers. If all lines running to the transformer are underground, small buildings are used. In rural areas, sometimes distribution transformers are mounted on poles, and the pole is usually made of concrete or iron due to the weight of the transformer.

== See also ==
- Bushing (electrical)
- Transformer types
- Current transformer
- Distribution Transformer Monitor

== Bibliography ==
- Bakshi, V.B.U.A. (2009). Transformers & Induction Machines. Technical Publications. ISBN 9788184313802.
- De Keulenaer, Hans; Chapman, David; Fassbinder, Stefan; McDermott, Mike (2001). The Scope for Energy Saving in the EU through the Use of Energy-Efficient Electricity Distribution Transformers (PDF). 16th International Conference and Exhibition on Electricity Distribution (CIRED 2001). Institution of Engineering and Technology. doi:10.1049/cp:20010853.
- Harlow, James H. (2012). Electric Power Transformer Engineering, Third Edition, Volume 2. CRC Press. ISBN 978-1439856291.
- Pansini, Anthony J. (2005). Guide to Electrical Power Distribution Systems. The Fairmont Press, Inc. ISBN 088173506X.
- Shoemaker, Thomas M.; Mack, James E. (2012). The Lineman's and Cableman's Handbook (12th ed.). McGraw Hill. ISBN 9780071742580.
