= Davor Ivo Stier =

Croatian-Argentine politician (born 1972)

Davor Ivo Stier MEP
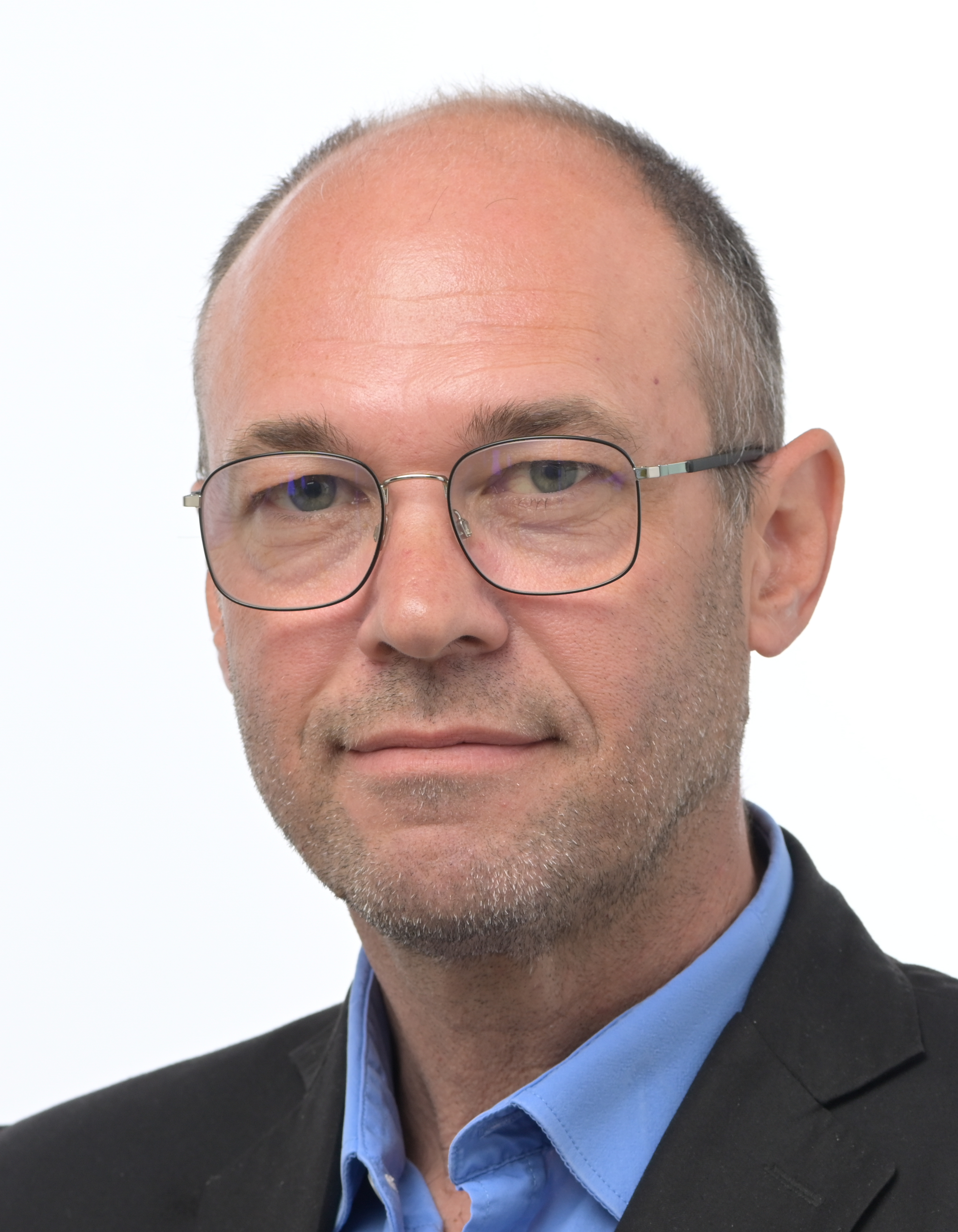
- Official portrait, 2024

Member of the European Parliament
- Incumbent
- Assumed office 16 July 2024
- Constituency: Croatia
- In office 1 July 2013 – 12 October 2016
- Constituency: Croatia

Deputy Prime Minister of Croatia
- In office 19 October 2016 – 19 June 2017
- Prime Minister: Andrej Plenković
- Preceded by: Tomislav Karamarko; Božo Petrov
- Succeeded by: Marija Pejčinović Burić

Minister of Foreign and European Affairs
- In office 19 October 2016 – 19 June 2017
- Prime Minister: Andrej Plenković
- Preceded by: Miro Kovač
- Succeeded by: Marija Pejčinović Burić

Personal details
- Born: 6 January 1972 (age 54) Buenos Aires, Argentina
- Party: Croatian Democratic Union
- Education: Pontifical Catholic University of Argentina
- Awards: Order of Duke Branimir (2014)

Davor Ivo Stier (Croatian pronunciation: [dâvor ǐːvo ʃtîːr]; born 6 January 1972) is a Croatian-Argentine politician and diplomat serving as member of the European Parliament since July 2024, having previously served from 2013 to 2016. He was a member of the Croatian Parliament in multiple terms, as well as the Minister of Foreign and European Affairs and Deputy Prime Minister of Croatia from 2016 to 2017.

== Family and studies ==
Stier was born in Buenos Aires, Argentina and lived in the middle-class Flores district (the same of Pope Francis) in a Croatian expatriate family originating from Samobor. His paternal grandfather, Ivan Stier, was an Ustaše colonel and aide to Vjekoslav Luburić. Like many high-ranking regime members, Stier fled to South America after World War II. His maternal grandfather, Milorad Lukač, was one of the leading emigrant politicians of the Croatian Peasant Party. Stier's father was a doctor and his mother, Marija Lukač, was a professor of philosophy at the Pontifical Catholic University of Argentina.

Stier first visited Croatia in 1990 at age 18 through a Croatian Heritage Foundation program. He returned three weeks before the fall of Vukovar as a correspondent for the Argentine newspaper El Cronista and Radio America. After going back to Argentina in February 1992, he earned a degree in political science and international relations from the Pontifical Catholic University of Argentina, followed by a degree in journalism.

== Political career ==
Stier returned to Croatia in 1996 at the invitation of the Ministry of Foreign Affairs, after which he worked in the Croatian embassies in Washington, D.C. and Brussels, and by 2009 was foreign policy adviser to Prime Minister Ivo Sanader.

At the 2011 parliamentary elections, Stier was elected a member of the Croatian Parliament. He became a member of the Interparliamentary Cooperation Committee and the Committee for European Integration, and was appointed Vice-Chairman of the Foreign Policy Committee. He was also nominated a member of the Croatian Parliament delegation at the NATO Parliamentary Assembly and the Croatian Parliament delegation at the Joint Parliamentary Committee of the Republic of Croatia. Stier was one of the closest associates of Jadranka Kosor and her adviser and delegate for Euro-Atlantic cooperation. During the Slovenian-Croatian diplomatic freeze, Stier was the main participant in the behind-the scenes diplomacy effort and mediator between Kosor and the Slovenian Prime Minister Borut Pahor. In the May 2012 HDZ leadership contest, Stier supported Tomislav Karamarko but was later opposed to the disciplinary proceedings against Jadranka Kosor in February 2013, after the party decided to sanction her because of her appearances in the media.

In September 2012, Stier asked the Croatian government to desist from ratification of the state border dispute between Croatia and Bosnia and Herzegovina, claiming that in so doing Croatia would have agreed to participate in blackmail politics and linked European Union membership to border issues. He accused Bosnia and Herzegovina's Transport Minister, Damir Hadžić, of blackmailing the Croatian government by stating that Bosnia and Herzegovina would not allow the construction of the Pelješac bridge unless Croatia ratified the border agreement. Two months later, in June, Stier stated that "Croatia must strongly take up the issue of the constituency of the Croatian people in Bosnia and Herzegovina not only on paper but also in practice." He estimated that the Federation of Bosnia and Herzegovina was "a de facto Bosniak entity" and announced the possibility of Bosnia and Herzegovina being reformed according to the Belgian model. He also said that Croatia would use Croatia's accession to the European Union to resolve the Croat issue in Bosnia and Herzegovina.

Following Croatia's EU accession, in the first elections to the European Parliament in Croatia in April 2013, Stier won 14 005 votes on the list of the HDZ coalition that was composed of HSP AS and BUZ. With 5.75% of votes cast, he became one of the first Members of the European Parliament from Croatia. At the session of the European Parliament's Foreign Policy Committee in July 2013, Stier requested that the European Union more strongly support the right of the Croatian people in BiH to equality with other constituent peoples and thus internationalized the "Croatian issue" in BiH. In an interview forVečernji list in the same month, Stier stated that Croats in BiH are an indispensable and decisive factor in the Europeanization of Bosnia and Herzegovina, while the role of the European Union in Bosnia and Herzegovina is crucial and that cooperation with Russia and Turkey is welcome.

In the second election for the European Parliament in Croatia in May 2014, Stier again won a 26,432-vote mandate as a candidate on the list of HDZ's coalition composed of HSS, HSP AS, BUZ, ZDS and HDS. In 2015, Stier published the book A New Croatian Paradigm: an Essay on Social Integration and Development (Nova hrvatska paradigma: ogled o društvenoj integraciji i razvoju)

Stier was Deputy Prime Minister of Croatia and the 13th Minister of Foreign and European Affairs in the Cabinet of Andrej Plenković from 19 October 2016 until his resignation on 19 June 2017. In May 2017, while serving as Minister of Foreign and European Affairs, Stier drew significant media attention for participating in the "Walk for Life", an anti-abortion march in Zagreb. He left the cabinet after the collapse of the HDZ-Most coalition and the new coalition with the Croatian People's Party.

Stier was a member of the Croatian Parliament in the 10th and 11th composition and the chairman of the EPP Group in the Parliamentary Assembly of the Council of Europe, as well as the chairman of Croatia's delegation. In the 2024 European Parliament election in Croatia, Stier was elected MEP and returned to the European Parliament.

== Personal life ==
Stier lives in Samobor with his wife and three children.

== See also ==
- List of foreign ministers in 2017

Political offices
Preceded by Božo Petrov	First Deputy Prime Minister of Croatia; 2016–2017	Succeeded by Marija Pejčinović Burić
Preceded by Miro Kovač	Minister of Foreign and European Affairs; 2016–2017	Succeeded by Marija Pejčinović Burić
