= Pothead =

High-voltage electrical connection device

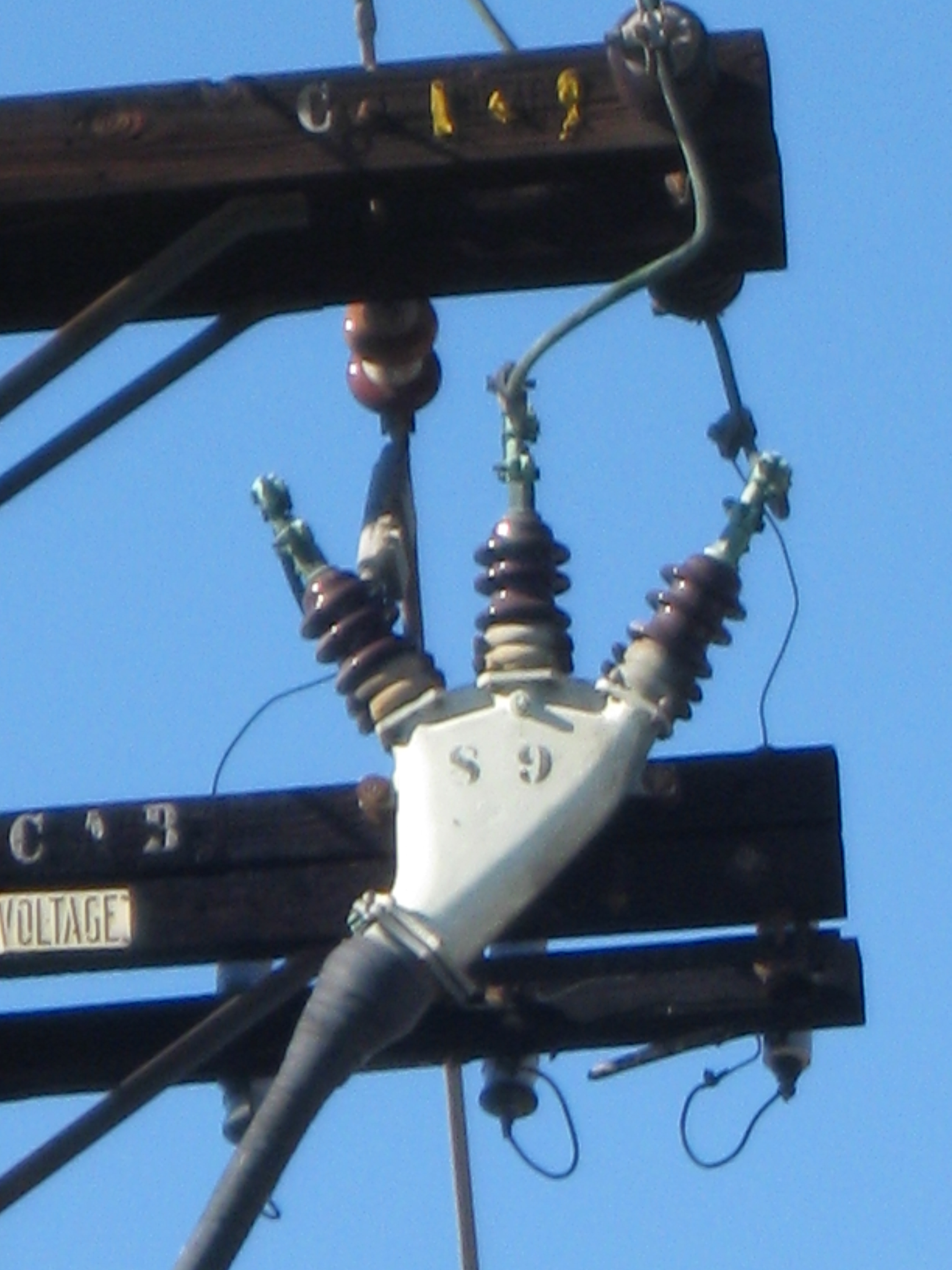
A three phase electric circuit terminated with a pothead

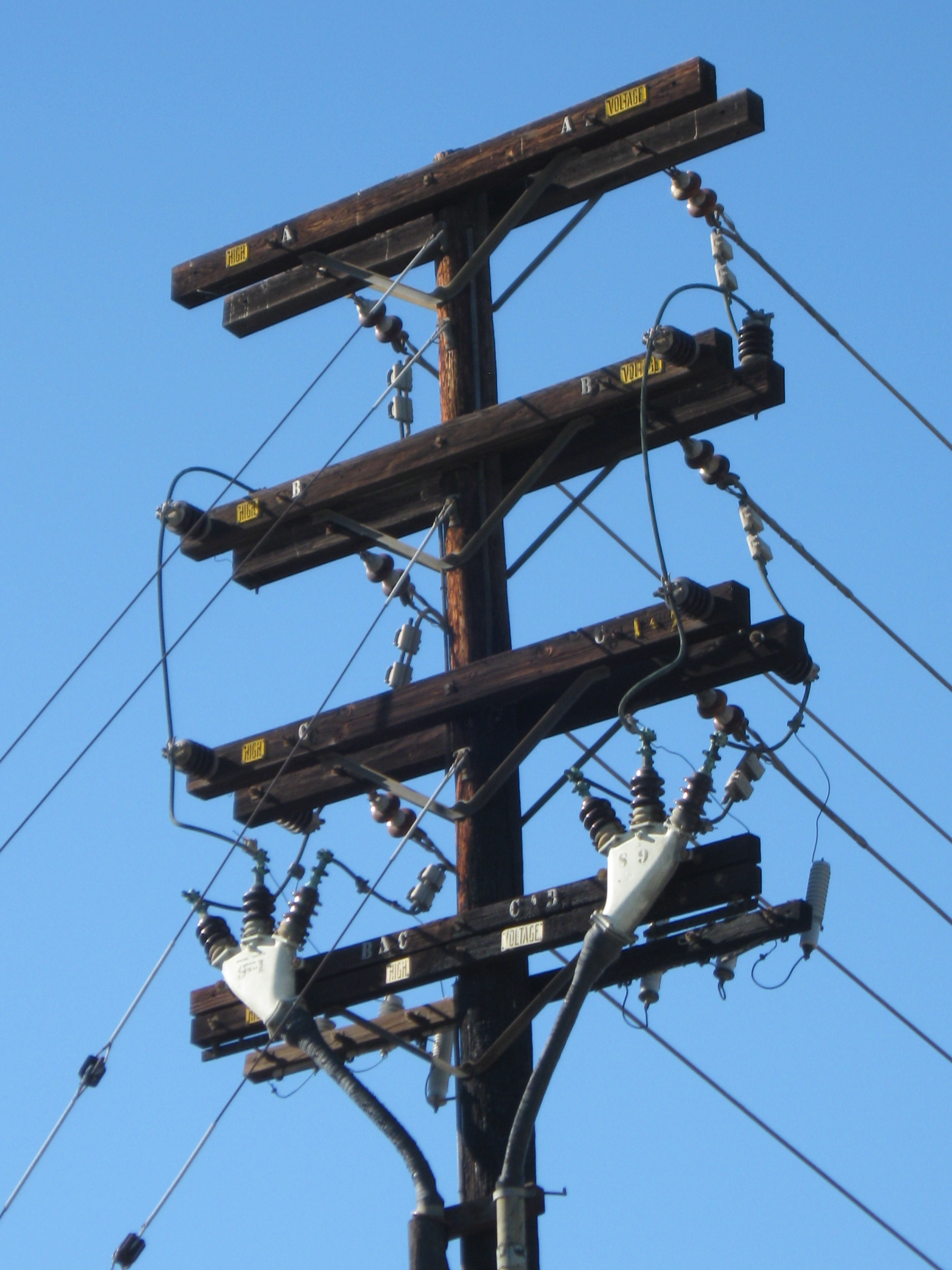
Crossarms with two three phase electric circuits terminated with potheads

A pothead is a type of insulated electrical terminal used for transitioning between overhead line and underground high-voltage cable or for connecting overhead wiring to equipment like transformers. Its name comes from the process of potting or encapsulation of the conductors inside the terminal's insulating bushing.

== Description ==
Potheads are used where higher-voltage power lines go underground, generally voltages of 600 volts or greater. They are used mostly for service drops for commercial and industrial buildings. For lower voltages such as those used for residential service drops, another weather seal called a weatherhead is used.

The device consists of a molded plastic housing that attaches to the end of an electrical conduit that carries the underground cables up the utility pole to the crossarm. Multiple bushing insulators project from the plastic body, each ending at an electrical terminal. Each overhead wire is connected to a bushing terminal from which the current passes through a rod down the center of the bushing to the interior of the housing, where it is connected to a wire from the conduit. Thus the device allows the overhead conductors to pass into the conduit while serving as a seal to keep out water. The purpose of the bushings, which have corrugations moulded into their surfaces, is to provide enough creepage distance along their surface to prevent leakage current from the high voltage terminal from flowing to the grounded metal conduit.

== Superseded ==
Pothead was once defined in Institute of Electrical and Electronics Engineers (IEEE) Std 48-1962 "Standards for Potheads." This standard was superseded by IEEE Std 48-1975 "IEEE Standard Test Procedures and Requirements for High-Voltage Alternating-Current Cable Terminations," and "pothead" was dropped from usage. The current standard is IEEE Std 48–2020.

What was once called a pothead is now called a "Class I High-Voltage Cable Termination," which must meet these requirements:

1. Electrical stress control
2. Insulation between the conductors and ground
3. An environmental seal

== Alternatives ==
Formerly, medium- and high-voltage cables (from about 2.5 kV and above) were terminated with hand-made "stress cones" composed of multiple layers of insulating tape, semi-conductive tape, and insulating putty. By tapering the layers of tape carefully, the potential gradient from the inside of the cable to free air was reduced so as not to cause electrical breakdown and tracking along the surface of the termination. Current practice for these terminations is to use a pre-molded rubber stress cone, which can be slipped over the cable end and shrunk to fit snugly around the exposed cable insulation. This saves considerable installation labor and reduces the chance of errors.

High voltage terminations conforming to IEEE Std 48-1990 and not requiring potting compound are illustrated below:

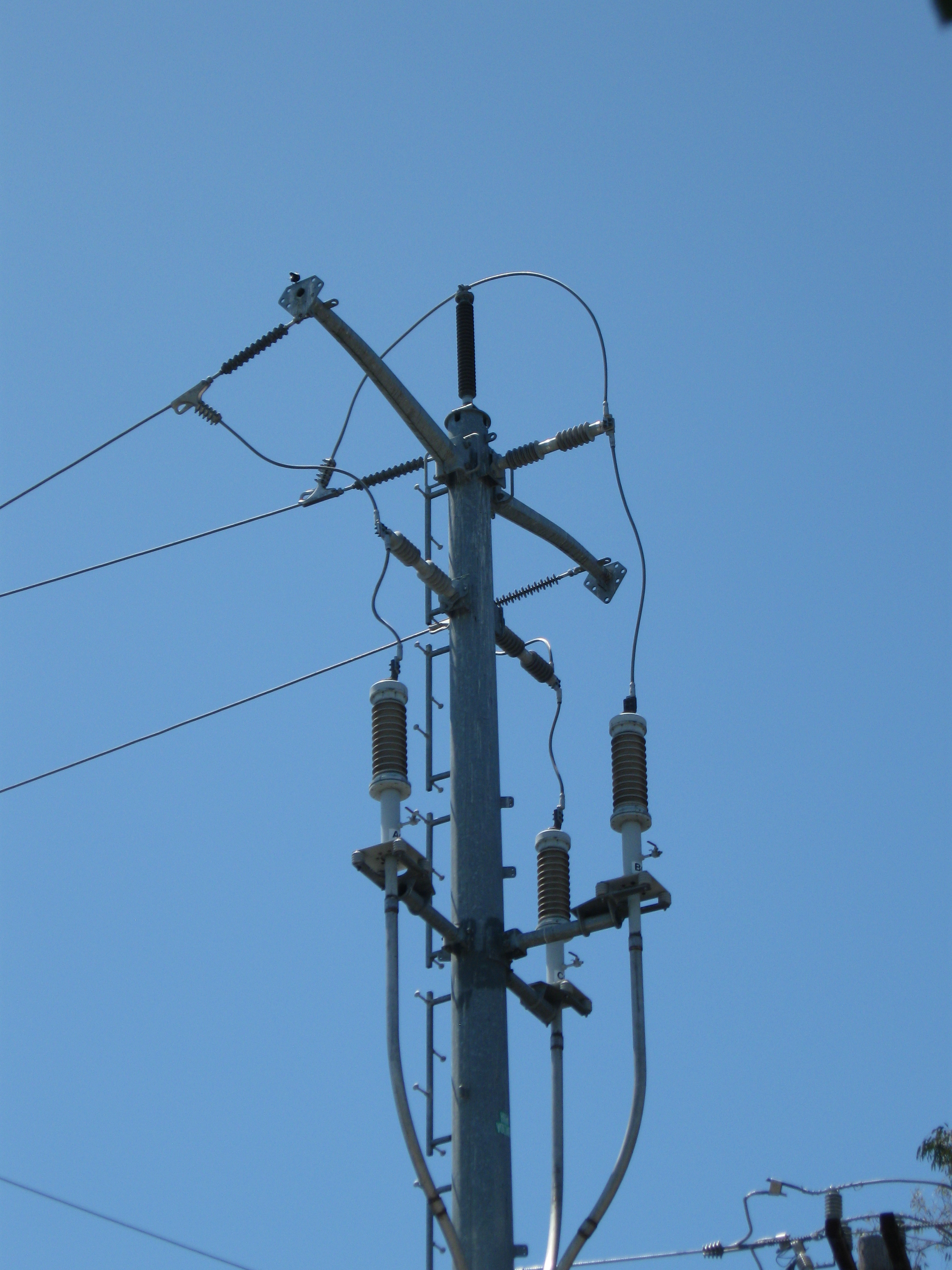
Transition of a 60kv powerline between overhead and underground

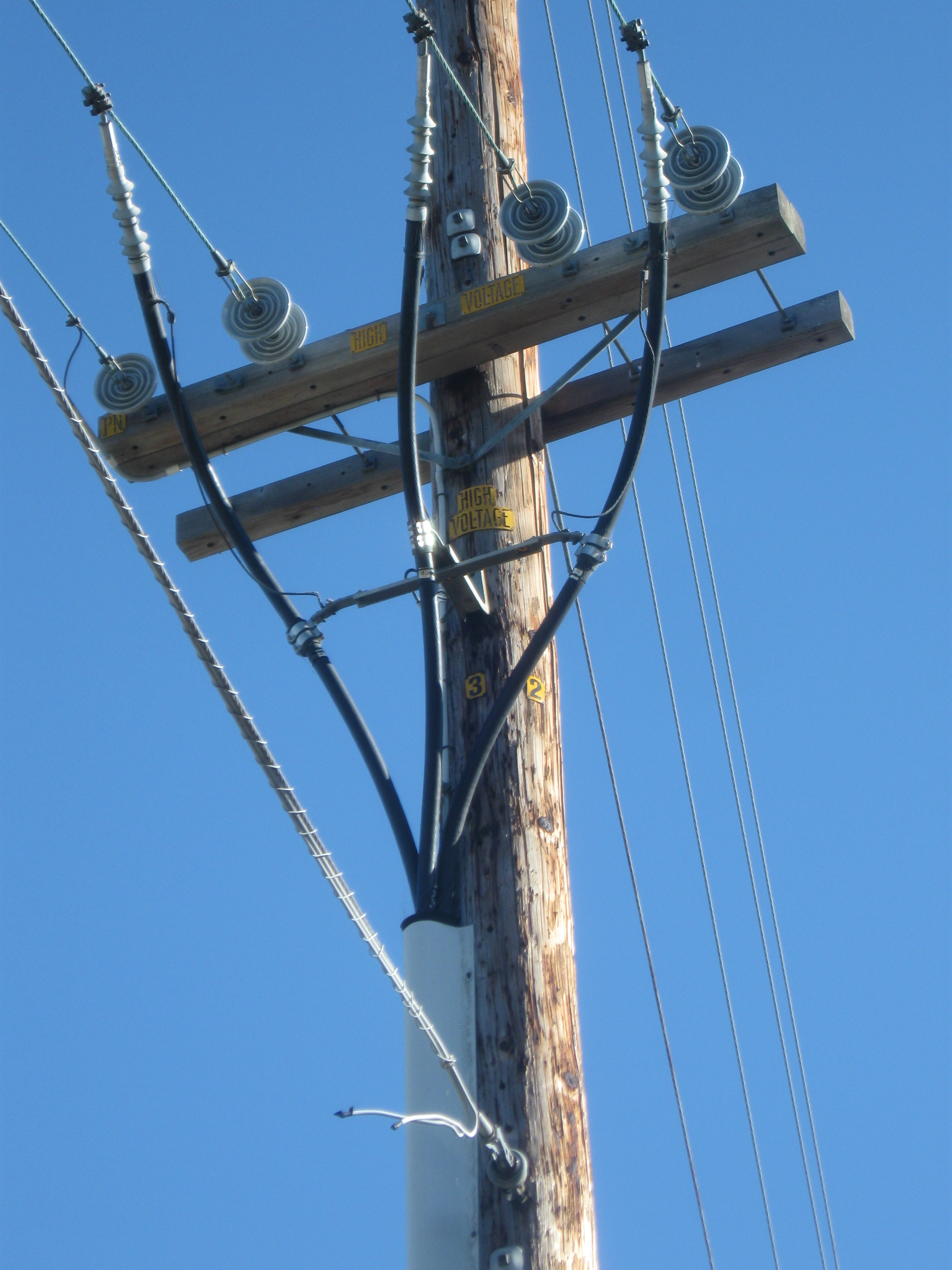
Transition of a 4160 Volt powerline from overhead to underground

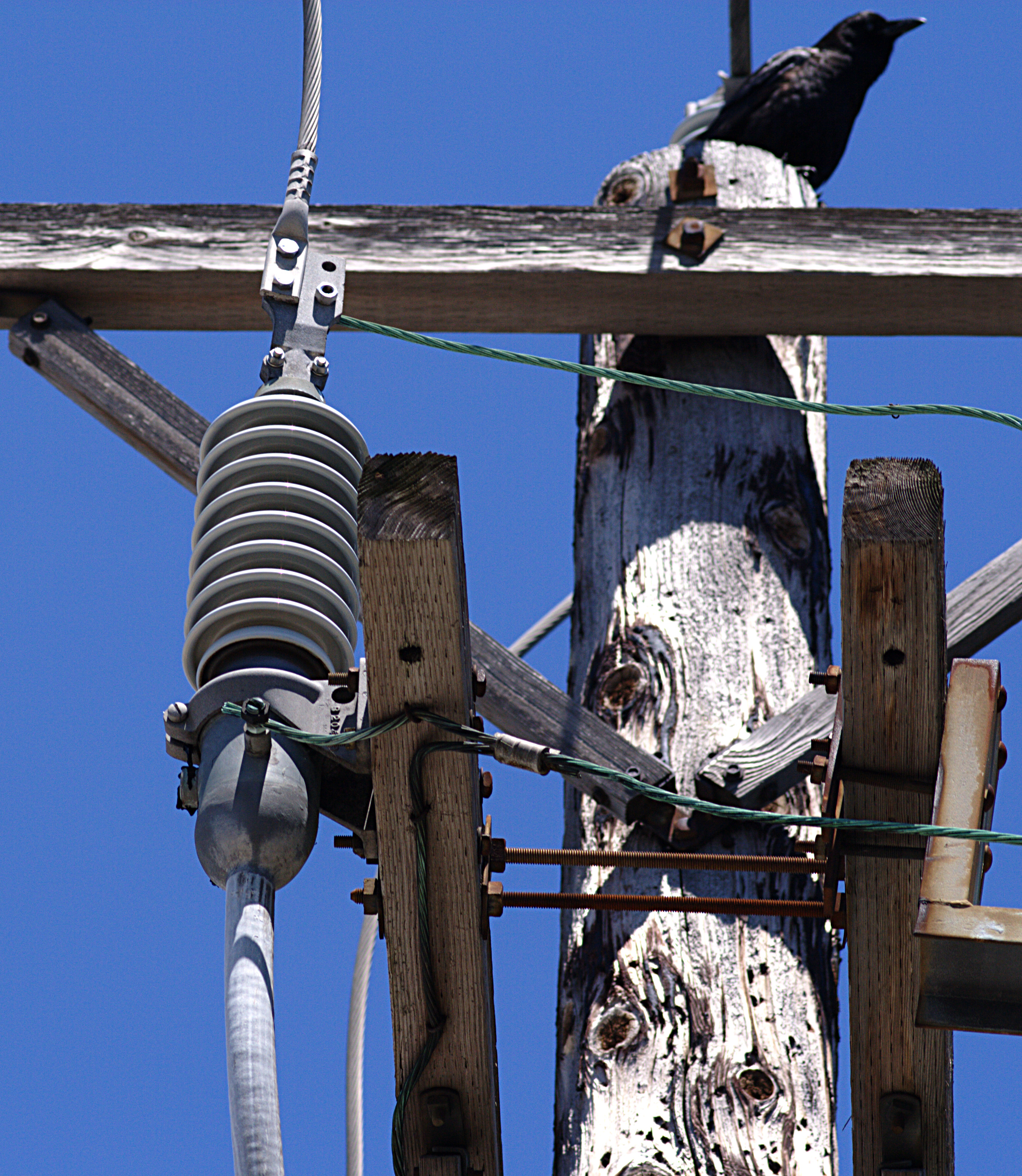
Pothead for one phase

== See also ==
- Weatherhead
