= Spot network substation =

High-reliability electrical installation

Layout of a spot low-voltage network

In electricity distribution networks, spot network substations (network transformers) are used in interconnected distribution networks. They have the secondary network (also called a grid network) with all supply transformers bussed together on the secondary side at one location. Spot networks are considered the most reliable and most flexible arrangement of connecting power to all types of loads. Switching can be done without interrupting the power to the loads.

== Description ==
Electricity distribution networks are typically of two types, radial or interconnected. A radial network arranges the station and branches like a tree with no connection to any other supply. This is typical of long rural lines with isolated load areas. In general, a radial distribution network has more power failures than an interconnected distribution network.

In a secondary network the transformers are distributed across an area (e.g. in streets) and have multiple supplies. The transformers are wired together on the secondary side. The system is arranged so that nearby transformers do not use the same feeder. In case of an issue with a feeder (or transformer) the load is fed by nearby transformers, so there is no interruption, although a voltage drop for said load may then be present. A fault on the secondary side may cause damage to the transformers before the primary-side protection system detects and clears the fault.

A spot network is basically a secondary network condensed to a point. Several transformers have multiple supplies and their secondaries are bussed together. Besides a region-wide blackout, they are vulnerable to a bus fault, which is extremely rare. The simplest case is where each transformer connects to one feeder and vice versa ("unit system"). High-voltage switching can be used to handle more cases, e.g., working transformer but faulty feeder or the reverse.

Network protectors (reverse current relays) are used to detect any open circuits that are letting the electrical current flow back towards its source.

== Examples ==
In large cities, many electric utility companies use grid feeders to make interconnected distribution networks to serve the downtown core. The interconnected network has multiple connections to the points of supply. Some of New York City's downtown areas are powered by submersible network transformers of 500 to 2,500 kVA. Usually these transformers are in vaults below metal grates in the sidewalks.

Urban (spot) network transformer substations can be used to make interconnected distribution networks to serve a single facility. These substations may consist of two to eight or more primary transformers connected to the same secondary bus to provide reliable facility power. Examples of such single facilities include airports, hospitals, major data processing centers (especially those using uninterruptible power supplies), and sports arenas that regularly broadcast nationally televised events. St. Jude Children's Research Hospital in Memphis, Tennessee has eight primary transformers that are connected to the same secondary bus. The FedExForum in Memphis has a network of four primary transformers connected to the same secondary bus. In some arrangements with four transformers, any of the transformers can carry all of its connected loads. The Toronto Pearson International Airport is electrically fed by four grid feeders, each capable of carrying the entire 20+ MW load.
