= Drop (telecommunication) =

Part of a device directly connected to internal station facilities

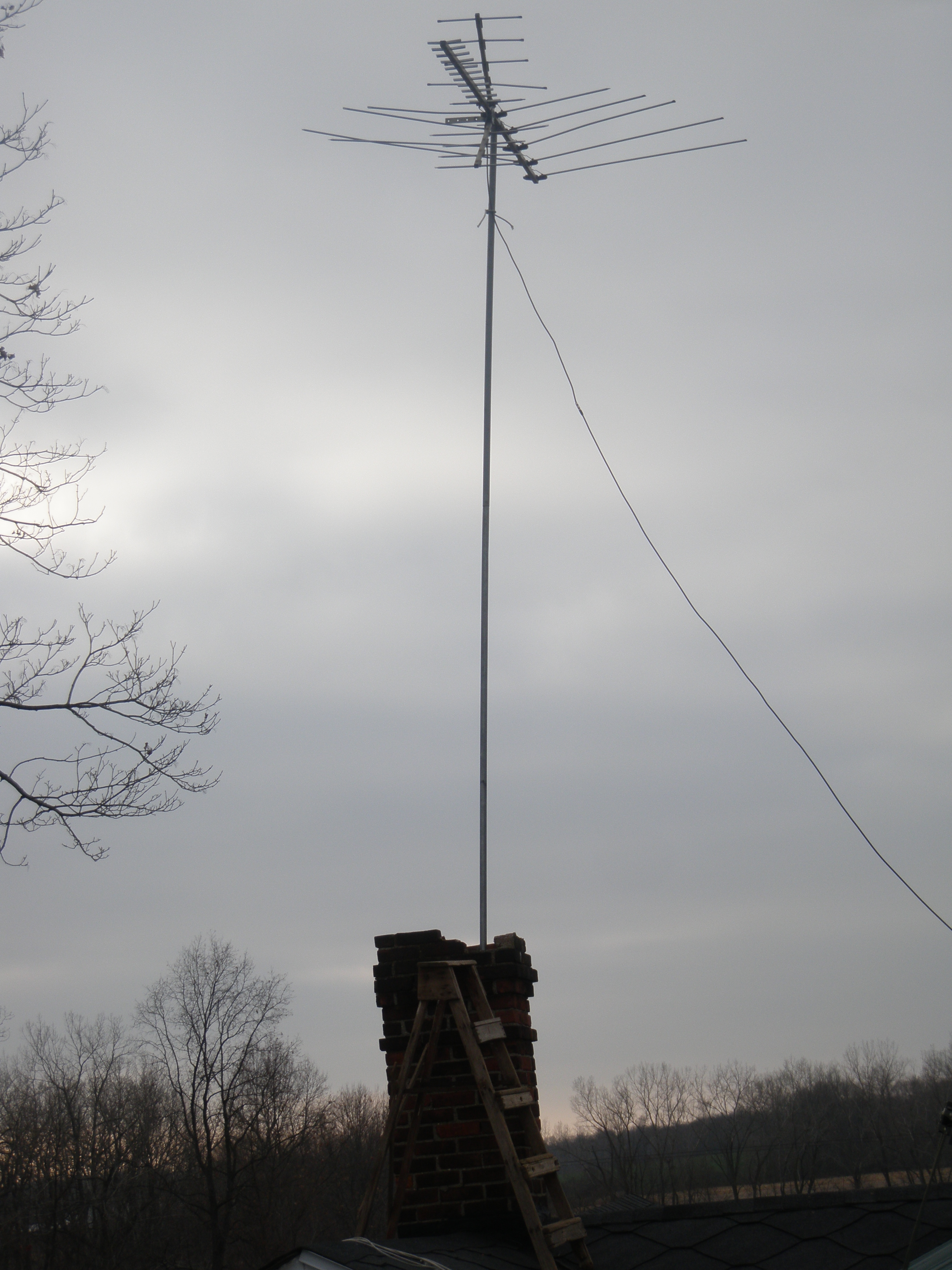
A TV antenna with a long downlead visible at right

In a communications network, a drop is the portion of a device directly connected to the internal station facilities, such as toward a telephone switchboard, toward a switching center, or toward a telephone exchange. A drop can also be a wire or cable from a pole or cable terminus to a building, in which case it may be referred to as a downlead. These cables may be reinforced to withstand the tension (due to gravity and weather) of an aerial drop (i.e., hanging in air), as in "messenger" type RG-6 coaxial cable, which is reinforced with a steel messenger wire along its length.

== See also ==
- Service drop

== Sources ==
- Federal Standard 1037C, in support of MIL-STD-188
