= Weatherhead =

Service drop entry point

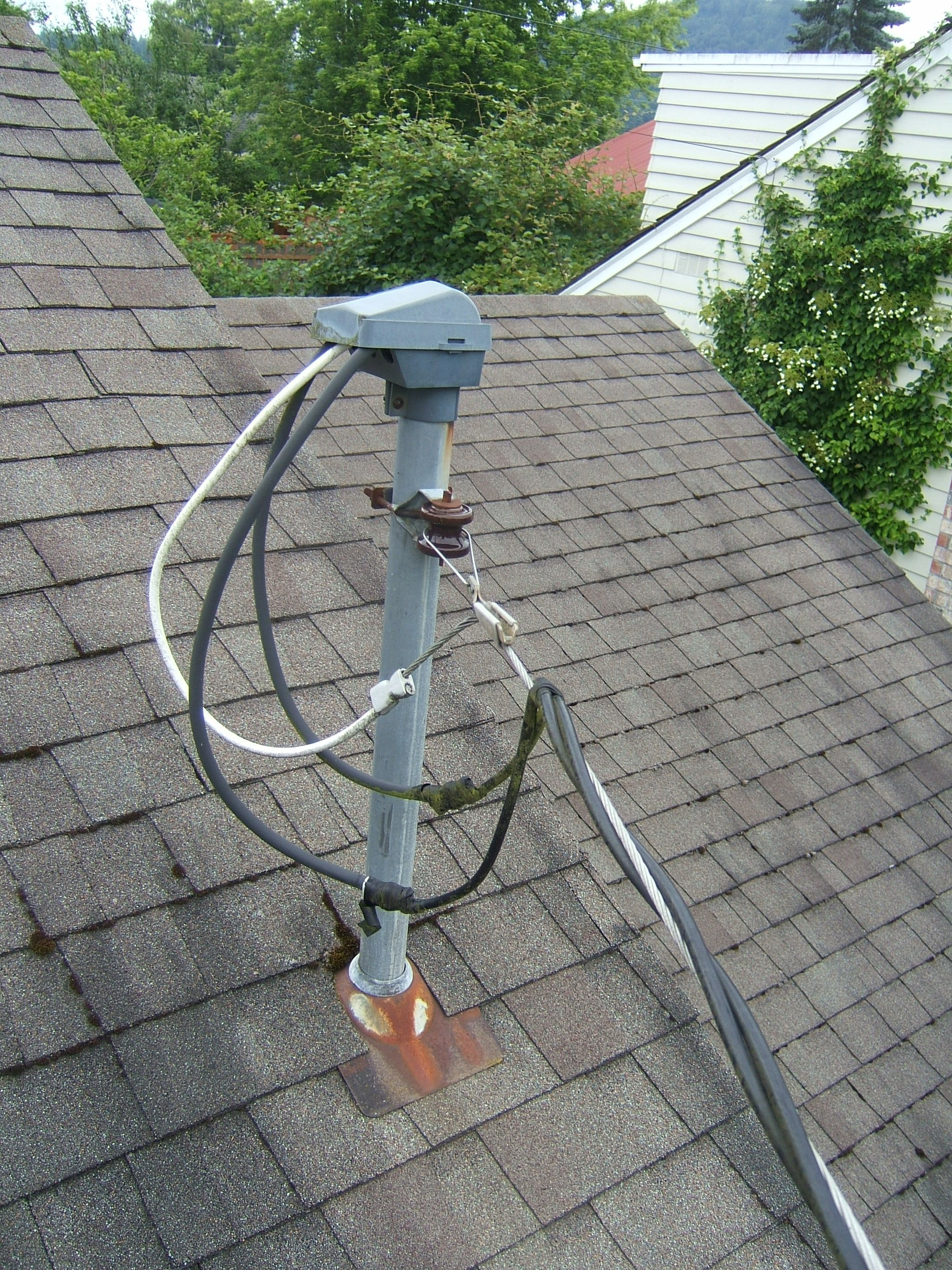
A weatherhead on a residence in Mount Vernon, Washington, US

A weatherhead, also called a weathercap, service head, service entrance cap, or gooseneck (slang) is a weatherproof service drop entry point where overhead power or telephone wires enter a building, or where wires transition between overhead and underground cables. At a building the wires enter a conduit, a protective metal pipe, and the weatherhead is a waterproof cap on the end of the conduit that allows the wires to enter without letting in water. It is shaped like a hood, with the surface where the wires enter facing down at an angle of at least 45°, to shield it from precipitation. A rubberized gasket makes for a tight seal against the wires. Before they enter the weatherhead, a drip loop is left in the overhead wires, which permits rain water that collects on the wires to drip off before reaching the weatherhead.

A weatherhead termination is only used at low voltages (up to 600 volts), since higher distribution voltages require more insulation between conductors and metal enclosures. Higher-voltage connections are made through a pothead.

Weatherheads are required by electrical codes or building codes. They are also used on utility poles where overhead power lines enter a conduit to pass underground.
