= Service drop =

Overhead electrical line running from a utility pole

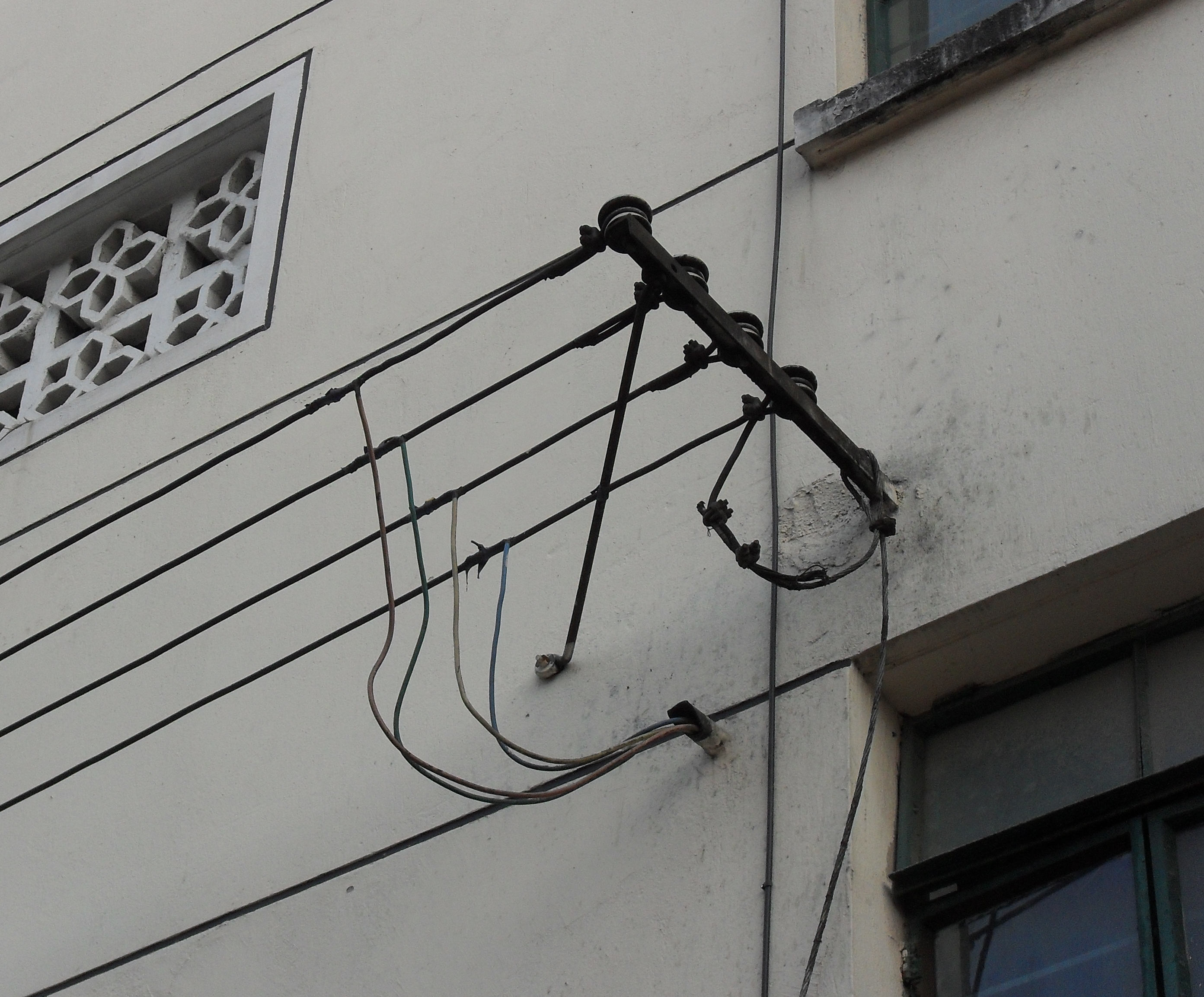
A three phase 400Y/220 volt service drop in China

In electric power distribution, a service drop is an overhead electrical line running from a utility pole to a customer's building or other premises. It is the point where electric utilities provide power to their customers. The customer connection to an underground distribution system is usually called a "service lateral". Conductors of a service drop or lateral are usually owned and maintained by the utility company, but some industrial drops are installed and owned by the customer.

At the customer's premises, the wires usually enter the building through a weatherhead that protects against entry of rain and snow, and drop down through conduit to an electric meter which measures and records the power used for billing purposes, then enters the main service panel. The utility's portion of the system ends, and the customer's wiring begins, at the output socket of the electric meter. The service panel will contain a "main" fuse or circuit breaker, which controls all of the electric current entering the building at once, and a number of smaller fuses/breakers, which protect individual branch circuits. There is always provision for all power to be cut off by operating either a single switch or small number of switches (maximum of six in the United States, for example); when circuit breakers are used this is provided by the main circuit breaker.

== Residential ==
=== North American ===
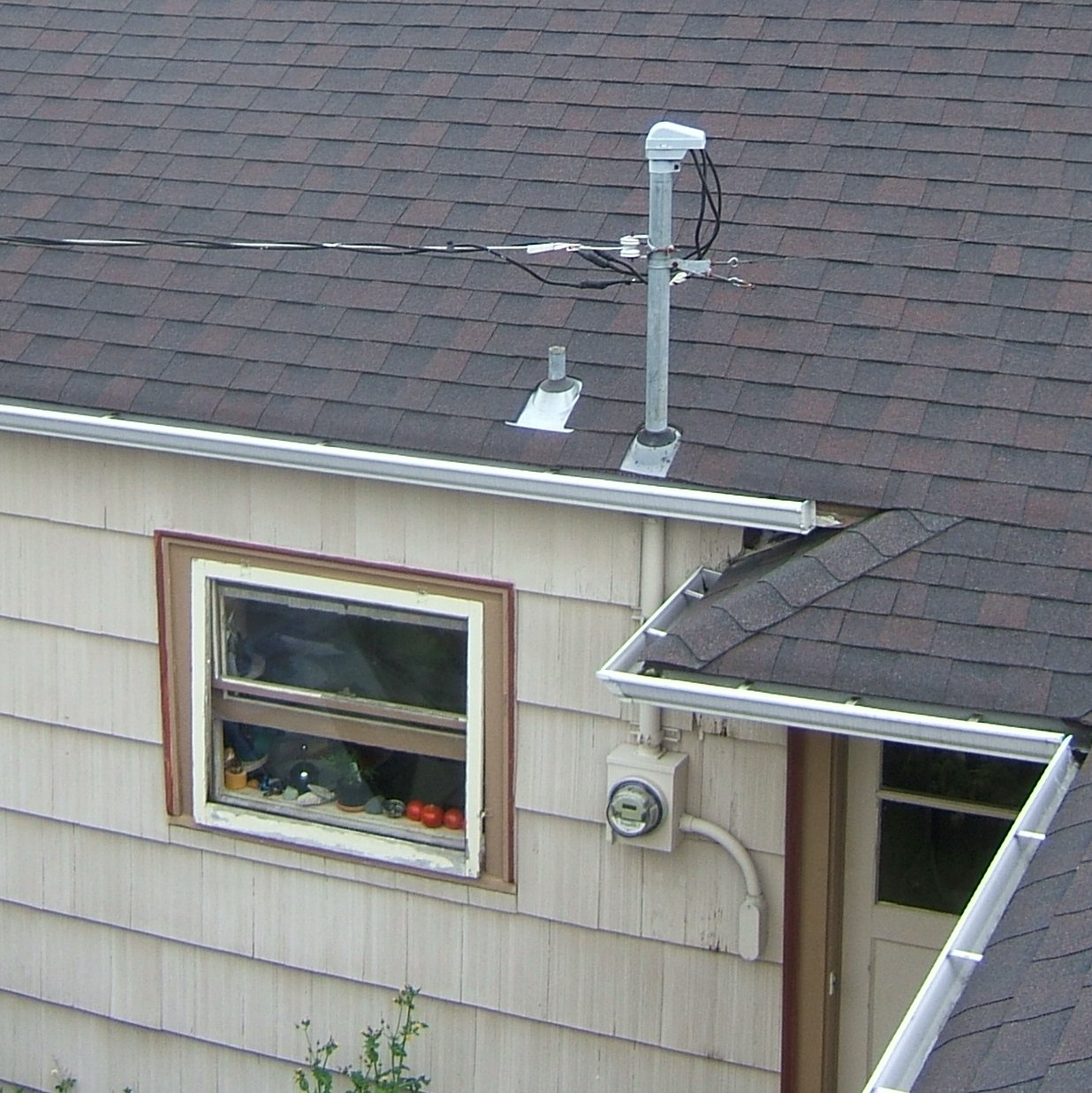
A 240/120 V split-phase service drop providing power to a residence in USA. The three wires from the utility pole enter through a weatherhead (top) into a vertical conduit, which routes them to the electric meter (bottom). From there they pass through the wall of the house to the electric panel and Main Fuses or Circuit Breakers inside.

In North America, the 120/240 V split phase system is used for residential service drops. A pole-mounted single phase distribution transformer usually provides power for one or two residences. The secondary winding of the transformer provides 240 volts between its ends and is center tapped. The service drop, to a weatherhead on the premises being supplied, is made up of a neutral line connected to the transformer's center tap and two lines connected to the ends of the winding which provide 120V with respect to the neutral line. When these lines are insulated and twisted together, they are referred to as a triplex cable which may contain a supporting messenger cable in the middle of the neutral conductor to provide strength for long spans. The neutral line from the pole is connected to a ground near the service panel; often a conductive rod driven into the earth. The service drop provides the building with two 120 V lines of opposite phase, so 240 V can be obtained by connecting a load between the two 120 V conductors, while 120 V loads are connected between either of the two 120 V lines and the neutral line. 240 V circuits are used for high-demand devices, such as air conditioners, water heaters, clothes dryers, ovens and boilers, while 120 V circuits are used for lighter loads such as lighting and ordinary small appliance outlets.

=== European ===
In many European countries and other countries that use European systems, three-phase service drops are often used for domestic residences. The use of three-phase power allows longer service drops to serve multiple residences, which is economical with the higher density of housing in Europe. The service drop consists of three phase wires and a neutral wire which is grounded. Each phase wire provides around 230 V to loads connected between it and the neutral. Each of the phase wires carries 50 Hz alternating current which is 120° out of phase with the other two. Several slightly different voltage standards have been used in the past as well: 220Y380, 230Y400 and 240Y415, with plans for future "harmonization" towards 230Y400. In this notation, the first number is the voltage between a phase wire and neutral, and the second number, after the "Y", is the line voltage (between any two-phase wires).

Other countries, such as the UK and Ireland, generally provide a single phase and neutral per house, with every third house on the same phase.

=== Australian ===
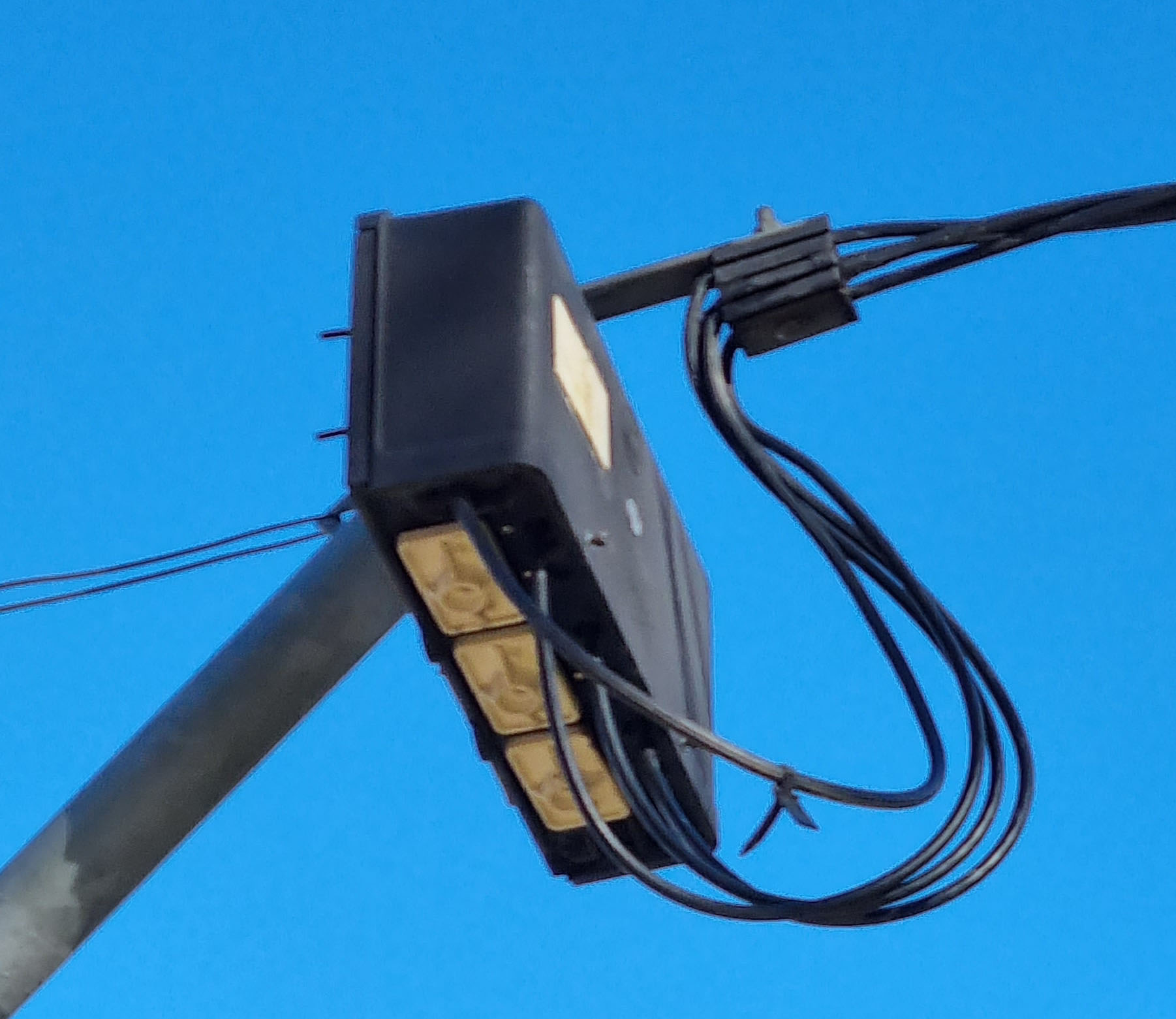
Australian three-phase fused "point of attachment" for electrical service to a premises

In Australian service drops, to avoid having unprotected cables within the building up to the service panel main switch, a fuse for each phase is provided at the point-of-attachment, at the weatherhead - called a "raiser bracket" in Australia - or on the outside of the building.

One or more removable ceramic "fuse holders", containing an appropriately sized service fuse for each phase protects all cables beyond this point. These fuses may be removed and replaced by the supply authority in the event of a fault causing them to "operate".

This box is termed a "Fused Overhead Line Connector Box" (FOLCB).

== Commercial and industrial ==
Commercial and industrial service drops can be much bigger, and are usually three phase. In the US, common services are 120Y/208 (three 120 V circuits 120 degrees out of phase, with 208 V line-to-line), 240 V three-phase, and 480 V three-phase. 600 V three-phase is common in Canada, and 380-415 V or 690 V three-phase is found in European and many other countries. Generally, higher voltages are used for heavy industrial loads, and lower voltages for commercial applications.

In North America where single-phase distribution transformers for service drops are the norm, three-phase service drops are often constructed using three single-phase transformers, wired in a Y configuration. This is called a transformer bank.

== Underground ==
Service conductors for a customer may be run underground, from a padmount transformer to a customer's meter.

== See also ==
- Drop (telecommunication)
