= Low-voltage network =

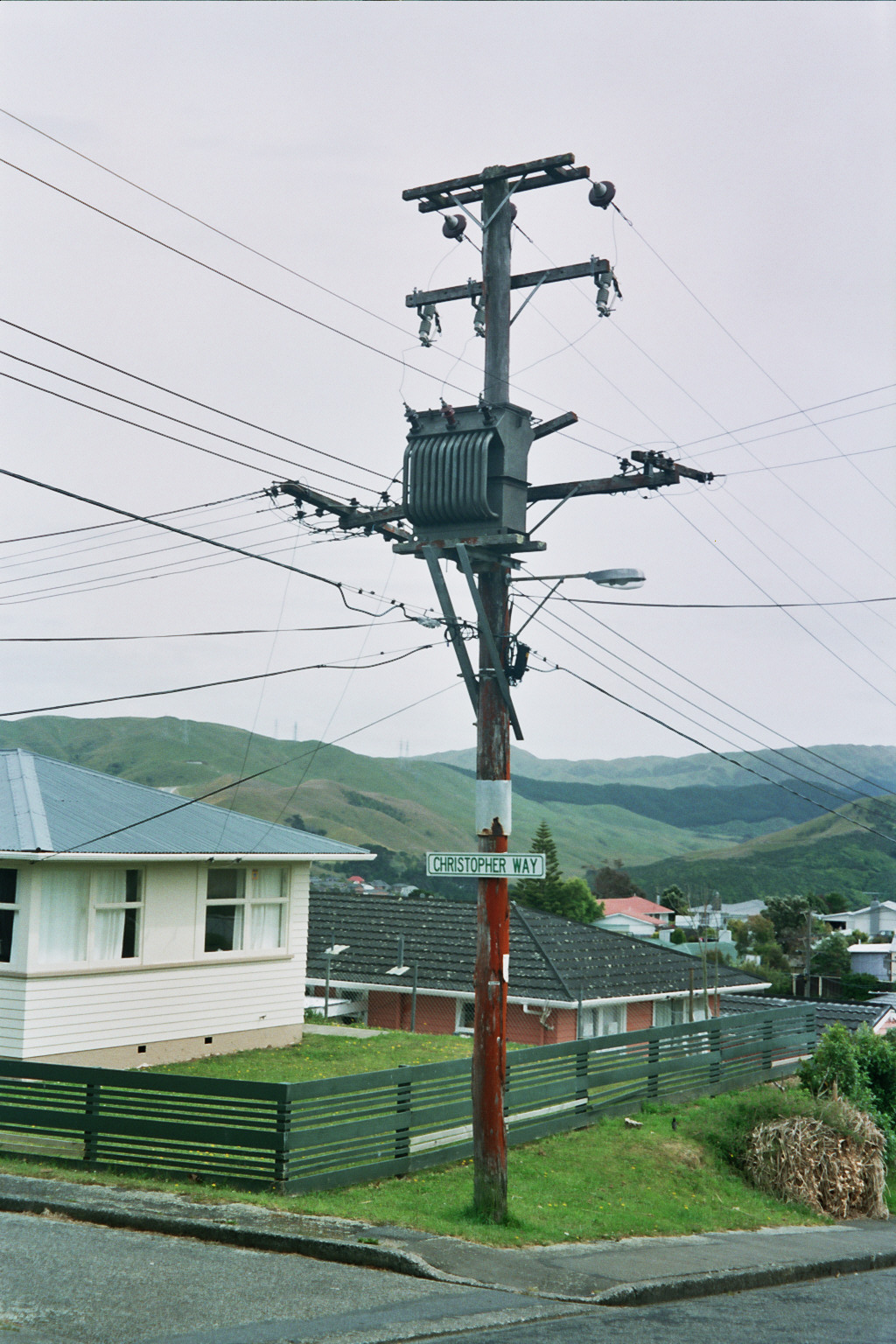
A pole-mounted three-phase distribution transformer. Low-voltage feeders distributing power to households are placed below the transformer

A low-voltage network or secondary network is a part of electric power distribution which carries electric energy from distribution transformers to electricity meters of end customers. Secondary networks are operated at a low voltage level, which is typically equal to the mains voltage of electric appliances.

Most modern secondary networks are operated at AC rated voltage of 100–127 or 220–240 volts, at the frequency of 50 or 60 hertz (see mains electricity by country). Operating voltage, required number of phases (three-phase or single-phase) and required reliability dictate topology and configuration of the network. The simplest form are radial service drop lines from the transformer to the customer premises. Low-voltage radial feeders supply multiple customers. For increased reliability, so-called spot networks and grid networks provide supply of customers from multiple distribution transformers and supply paths. Electric wiring can be realized by overhead power lines, aerial or underground power cables, or their mixture.

== Overview ==
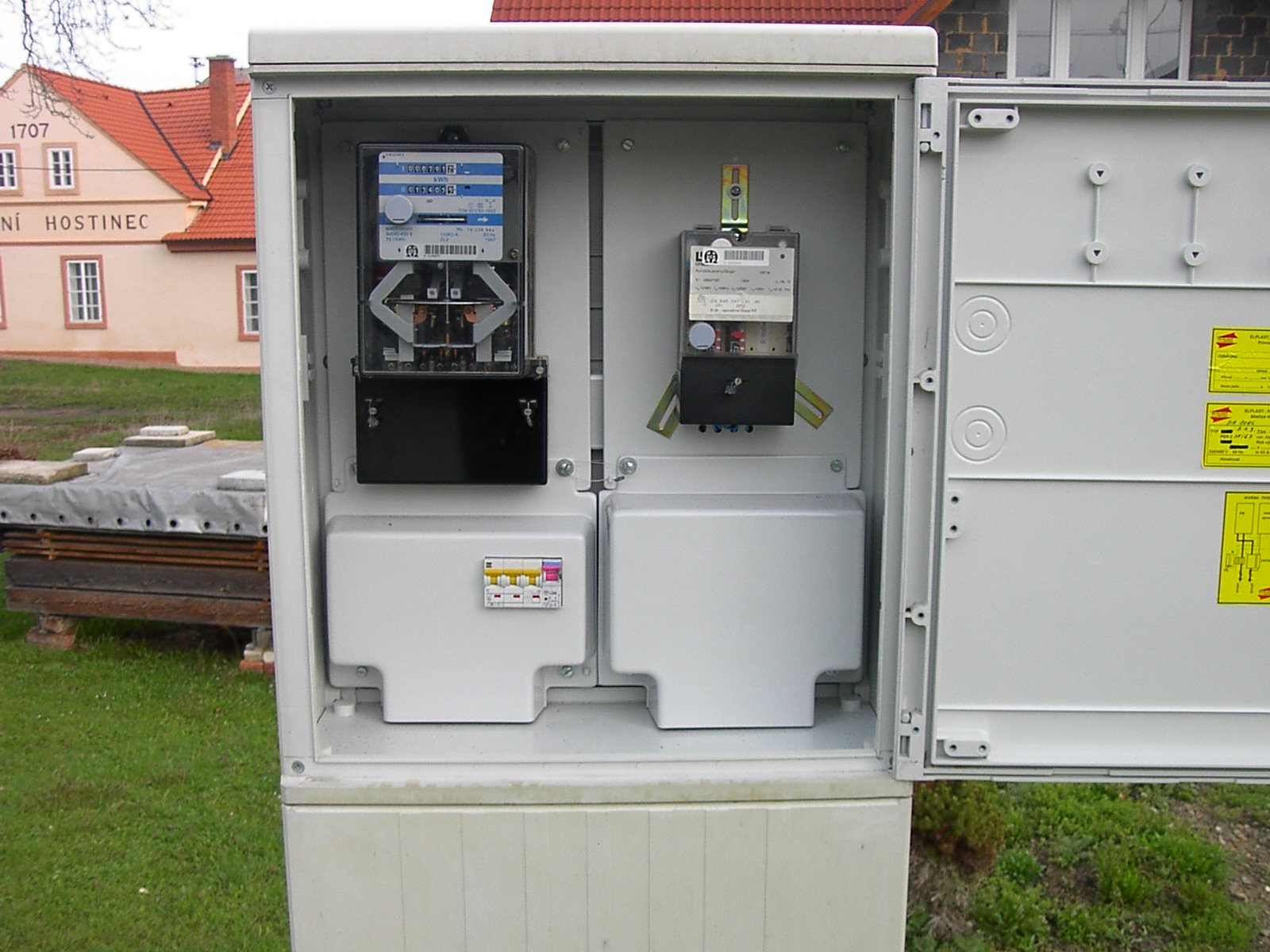
A house cable connection cabinet equipped with a meter, a time switch and a circuit breaker

Electric power distribution systems are designed to serve their customers with reliable and high-quality power. The most common distribution system consists of simple radial circuits (feeders) that can be overhead, underground, or a combination. From the distribution substation, feeders carry the power to the end customers, forming the medium-voltage or primary network, operated at a medium voltage level, typically 5–35 kV. Feeders range in length from a few kilometers to several tens of kilometers. As they must supply all customers in the designated distribution area, they often curve and branch along the assigned corridors. A substation typically supplies 3–30 feeders.

Distribution transformers or secondary transformers, placed along feeders, convert the voltage from the medium to a low voltage level, suitable for direct consumption by end customers (mains voltage). Typically, a rural primary feeder supplies up to 50 distribution transformers, spread over a wide region, but the figure significantly varies depending on configuration. They are sited on pole tops, cellars or designated small plots. From these transformers, low-voltage or secondary network branches off to the customer connections at customer premises, equipped with electricity meters.

== Design considerations ==
Typical layouts of European (left) and North American (right) distribution system

Most of differences in the layout and design of low-voltage networks are dictated by the mains voltage rating. In Europe and most of the world 220–240 V is the dominant choice, while in North America 120 V is the standard.

ANSI standard C84.1 recommends a +5%, −2.5% tolerance for the voltage range at a service point. North American LV networks feature much shorter secondary connections, up to 250 feet (80 m), while in European design they can reach up to 1 mile (1,600 m). North American distribution transformers must be therefore placed much closer to consumers, and are smaller (25–50 kVA), while European ones can cover larger areas and thus have higher ratings (300–1000 kVA); only the remote rural areas in European design are served by single-phase transformers.

As the low-voltage distribute the electric power to the widest class of end users, another main design concern is safety of consumers who use the electric appliances and their protection against electric shocks. An earthing system, in combination with protective devices such as fuses and residual current devices, must ultimately ensure that a person must not come into touch with a metallic object whose potential relative to the person's potential (which is, in turn, equal to the ground potential unless insulating mats are used) exceeds a "safe" threshold, typically set at about 50 V.

== Topology ==
=== Radial networks ===
Typical layouts of radial low-voltage networks

Radial operation is the most widespread and most economic design of both MV and LV networks. It provides a sufficiently high degree of reliability and service continuity for most customers. In American (120 V) systems, the customers are commonly supplied directly from the distribution transformers via relatively short service drop lines, in star-like topology. In 240 V systems, the customers are served by several low-voltage feeders, realized by overhead power lines, aerial or underground power cables, or their mixture; in an overhead network, service drops are drawn from pole tops to roof connections. In a cable network, all necessary connections and protection devices are typically placed in pad-mounted cabinets or, occasionally, manholes (buried T-joint connections are prone to failures).

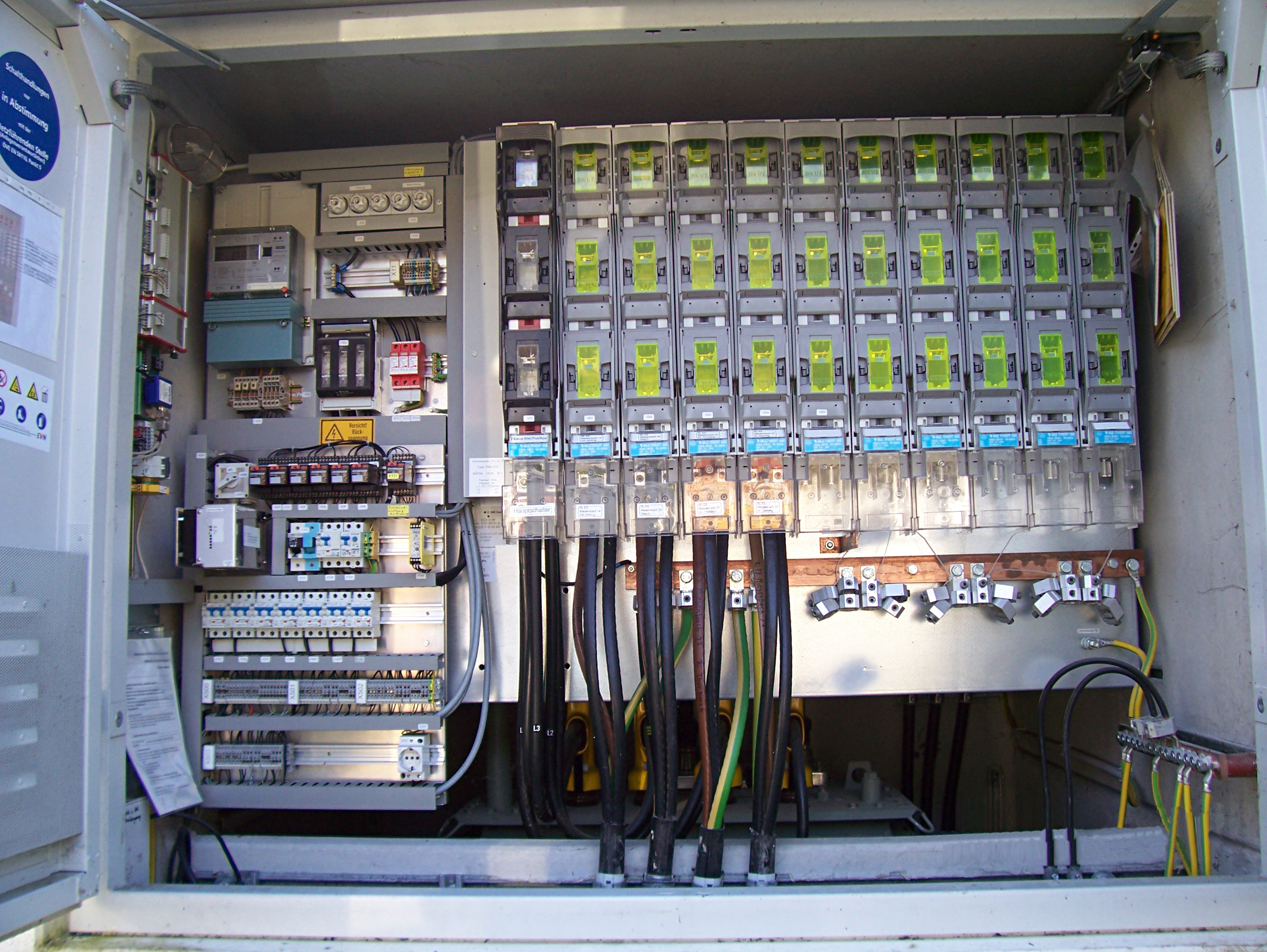
Low-voltage side switching cabinet of a European MV/LV substation. Four LV cable feeders equipped with circuit breakers featured.

Power-system protection in radial networks is simple to design and implement, since short-circuit currents have only one possible path that needs to be interrupted. Fuses are most commonly used for both short-circuit and overload protection, while low-voltage circuit breakers may be used in special circumstances.

=== Spot networks ===
Layout of a spot low-voltage network

Spot networks are used when increased reliability of supply is required for important customers. The low-voltage network is supplied from two or more distribution transformers at a single site, each fed from a different MV feeder (which may originate from the same or different substations). The transformers are connected together with a bus or a cable on secondary side, termed paralleling bus or collector bus. The paralleling bus typically does not have connecting cables (reaches) to other network units, in which case such networks are termed isolating spot networks; when they have, they are referred to as spot networks with reach. In some cases, fast-acting secondary bus tie breakers may be applied between bus sections to isolate faults in the secondary switchgear and limit loss of service.

Spot systems are commonly applied in high load-density areas such as business districts, large hospitals, small industry and important facilities such as water supply systems. In normal operation, the energy supply is provided by both primary feeders in parallel. In case of an outage of either primary feeder, network protector device at the corresponding spot transformer secondary automatically opens; the remaining transformers continue to provide supply through their respective primary feeders. Only in cases when the short circuit is located at the paralleling bus, or a total loss of primary supply occurs, the customer will remain out of service. Faults on the low-voltage network are handled by fuses or local circuit breakers, resulting in loss of service only for the affected loads.

=== Grid networks ===
Layout of a grid low-voltage network

A grid networks consist of an interconnected grid of circuits, energized from several primary feeders through distribution transformers at multiple locations. Grid networks are typically featured in downtowns of large cities, with connecting cables laid out in underground conduits along the streets. Numerous cables allow for multiple current paths from every transformer to every load within the grid.

As with spot networks, network protectors are used to protect against primary feeder faults, and prevent fault current to propagate from the grid to the primary feeder. Individual cable sections may be protected by cable limiters on both ends, special fuses providing very fast short-circuit protection. Cable limiters do not have an ampere rating, and cannot be used to provide overload protection; their sole purpose is to isolate the fault. Under high short-circuit conditions, limiters blow and cut off the faulted cable, while the unaffected cables take over its load and continue to provide service. Primary feeder outages, as well as limiters and network protectors cleared because of previous faults, cause changes in load flow that are not readily detected, so their statuses may require a periodic inspection. The inherent system redundancy generally prevents any customer from experiencing outage.

== See also ==
- Earthing system
- Split-phase electric power
