= Electrical conduit =

Tube used to protect and route electrical wiring in a building or structure

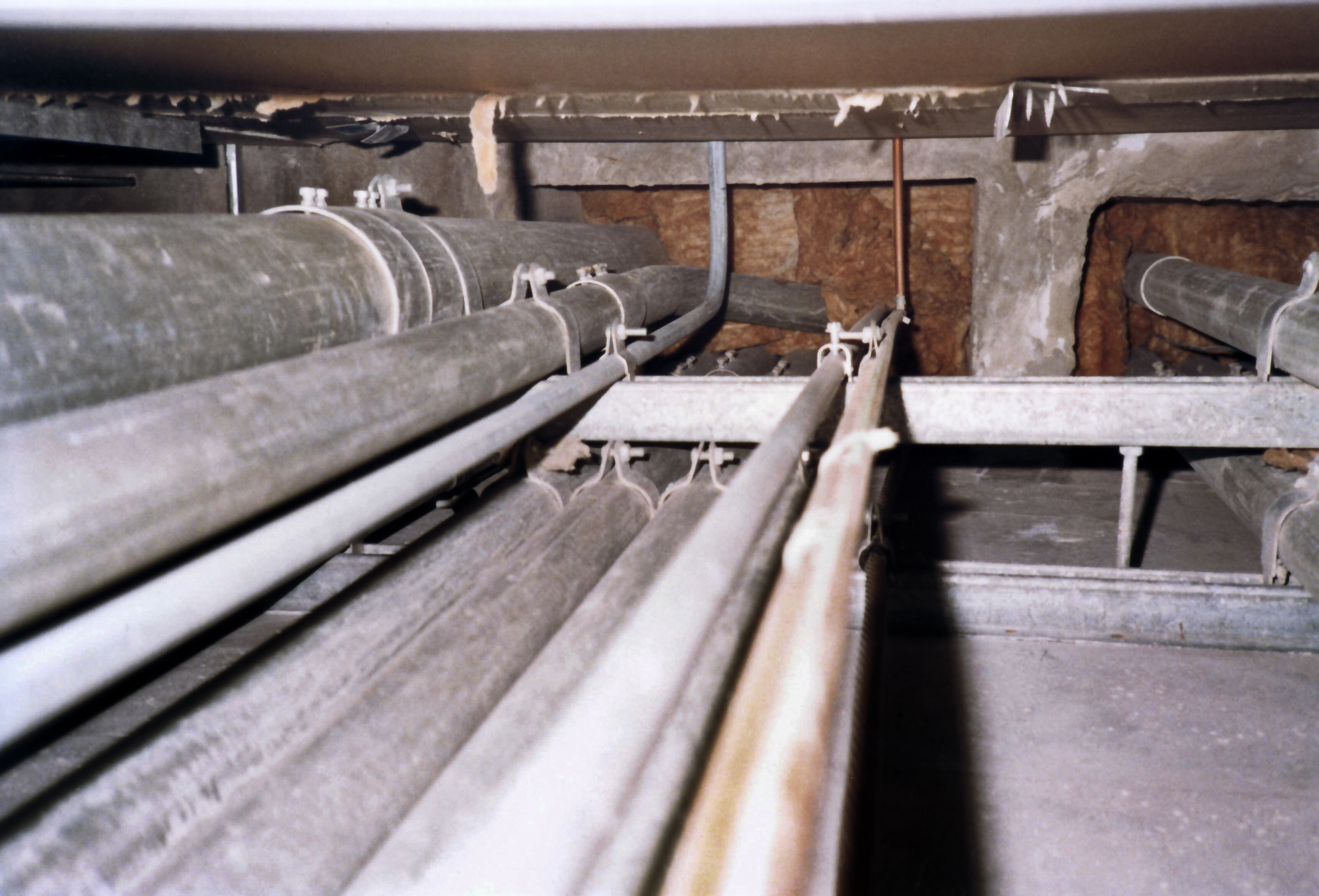
This illustration shows electrical conduit risers, looking up inside a fire-resistance rated shaft, as seen entering bottom of a firestop. The firestop is made of firestop mortar on top and mineral wool on the bottom. Raceways are used to protect electrical cables from damage.

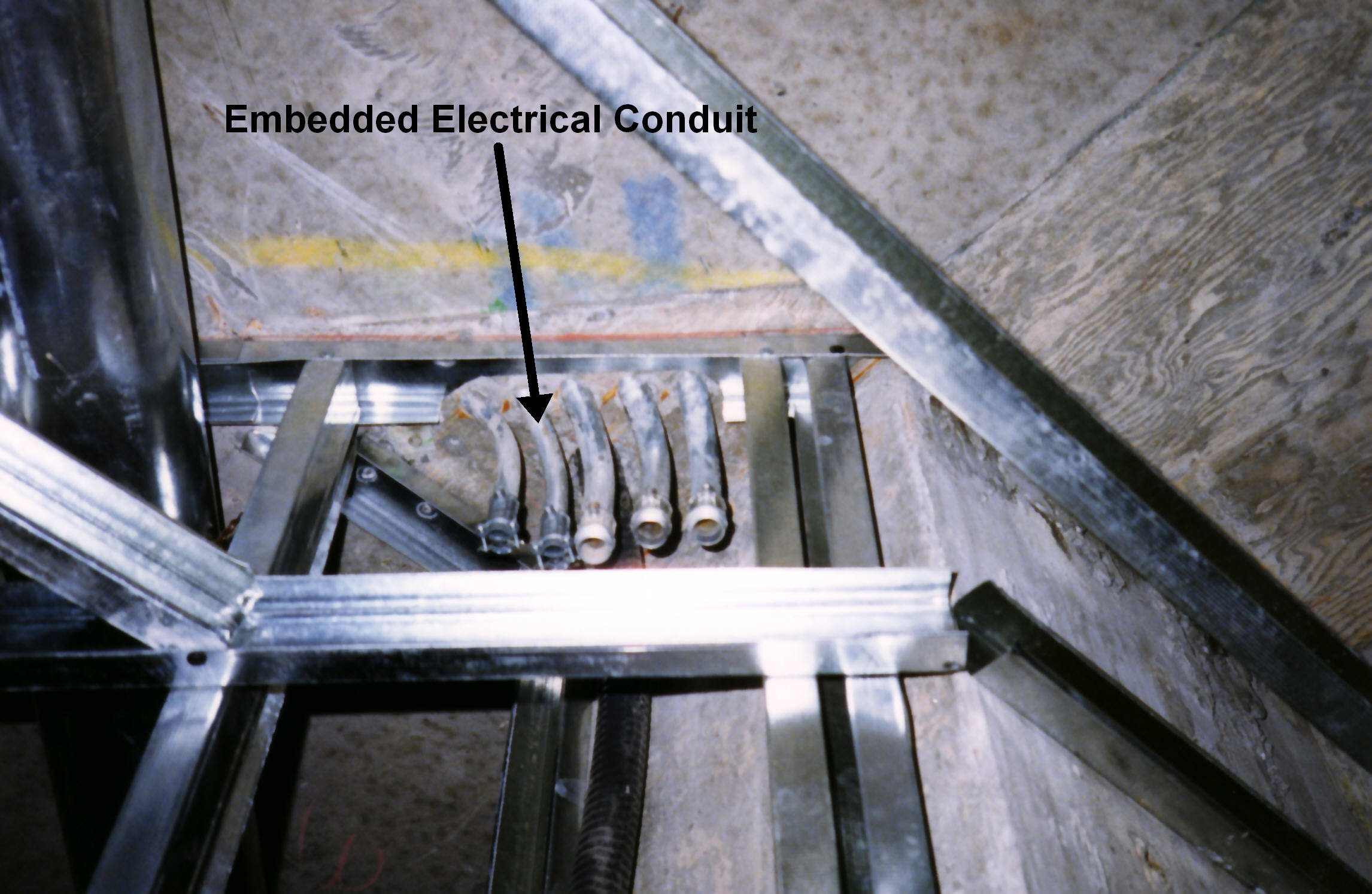
Conduit embedded in concrete structure for distribution of electrical cables throughout this highrise apartment building

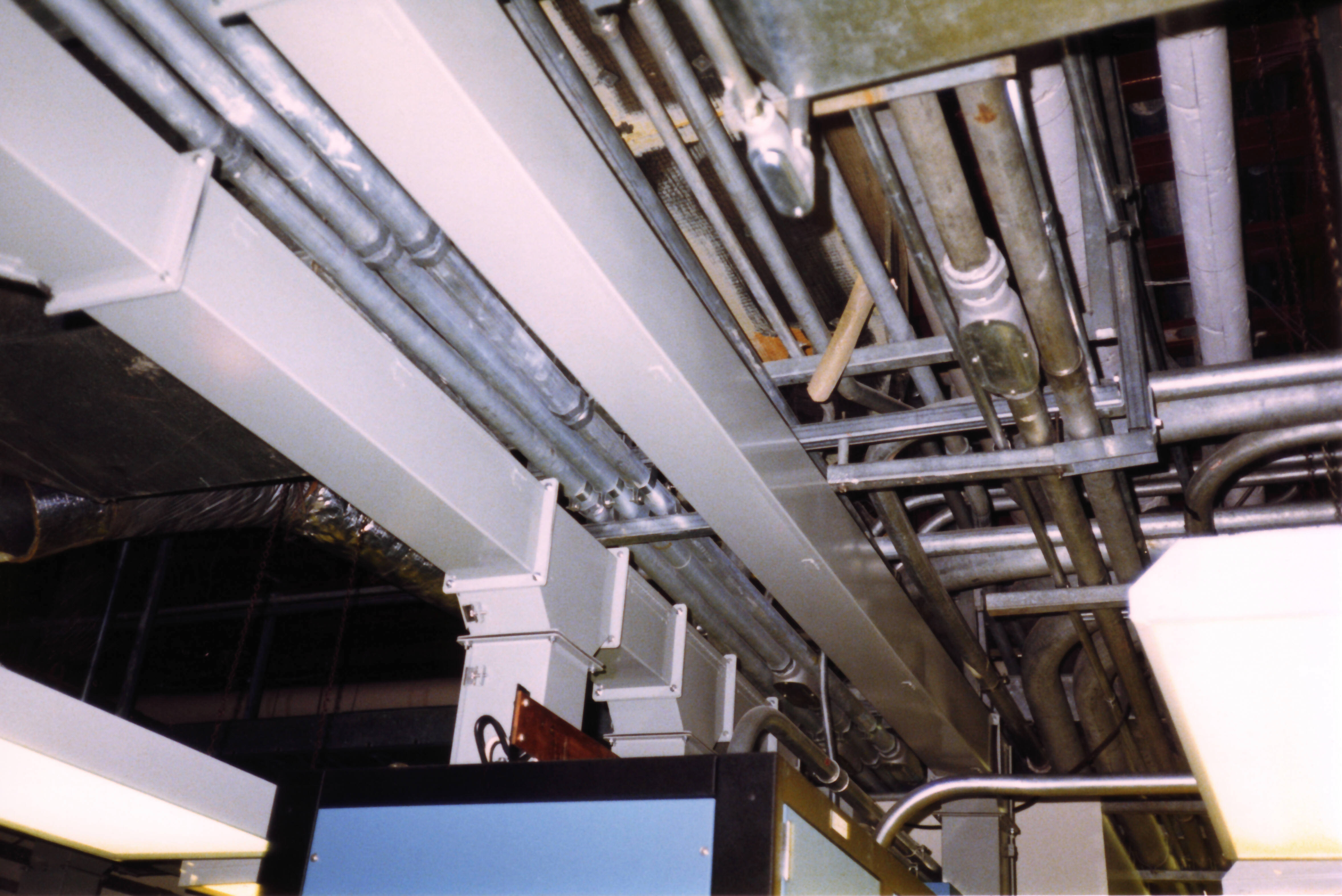
Electrical conduit and bus duct in a building at Texaco Nanticoke refinery

An electrical conduit is a tube used to protect and route electrical wiring in a building or structure. Electrical conduit may be made of metal, plastic, fiber, or fired clay. Most conduit is rigid, but flexible conduit is used for some purposes. Conduit is generally installed by electricians at the site of installation of electrical equipment. Its use, form, and installation details are often specified by wiring regulations, such as the US National Electrical Code (NEC) and other building codes.

== Comparison with other wiring methods ==
Electrical conduit provides very good protection to enclosed conductors from impact, moisture, and chemical vapors. Varying numbers, sizes, and types of conductors can be pulled into a conduit, which simplifies design and construction compared to multiple runs of cables or the expense of customized composite cable. Wiring systems in buildings may be subject to frequent alterations. Frequent wiring changes are made simpler and safer through the use of electrical conduit, as existing conductors can be withdrawn and new conductors installed, with little disruption along the path of the conduit.

A conduit system can be made waterproof or submersible. Metal conduit can be used to shield sensitive circuits from electromagnetic interference, and also can prevent emission of such interference from enclosed power cables. Non-metallic conduits resist corrosion and are light-weight, reducing installation labor cost.

When installed with proper sealing fittings, a conduit will not permit the flow of flammable gases and vapors, which provides protection from fire and explosion hazard in areas handling volatile substances.

Some types of conduit are approved for direct encasement in concrete. This is commonly used in commercial buildings to allow electrical and communication outlets to be installed in the middle of large open areas. For example, retail display cases and open-office areas use floor-mounted conduit boxes to connect power and communications cables.

Both metal and plastic conduit can be bent at the job site to allow a neat installation without excessive numbers of manufactured fittings. This is particularly advantageous when following irregular or curved building profiles. Special tube bending equipment is used to bend the conduit without kinking or denting it.

The cost of conduit installation is higher than other wiring methods due to the cost of materials and labor. In applications such as residential construction, the high degree of physical damage protection may not be required, so the expense of conduit is not warranted. (In certain jurisdictions, such as Chicago, Illinois, the use of conduit is always required.) Conductors installed within conduit cannot dissipate heat as readily as those installed in open wiring, so the current capacity of each conductor must be reduced (derated) if many are installed in one conduit. It is impractical, and prohibited by wiring regulations, to have more than 360 degrees of total bends in a run of conduit, so special outlet fittings must be provided to allow conductors to be installed without damage in such runs.

Some types of metal conduit may also serve as a useful bonding conductor for grounding (earthing), but wiring regulations may also dictate workmanship standards or supplemental means of grounding for certain types. While metal conduit may sometimes be used as a grounding conductor, the circuit length is limited. For example, a long run of conduit as grounding conductor may have too high an electrical resistance, and not allow proper operation of overcurrent devices on a fault.

== Types ==
Conduit systems are classified by the wall thickness, mechanical stiffness, and material used to make the tubing. Materials may be chosen for mechanical protection, corrosion resistance, and overall cost of the installation (labor plus material cost). Wiring regulations for electrical equipment in hazardous areas may require particular types of conduit to be used to provide an approved installation.

=== Metal ===
Rigid metal conduit (RMC) is a thick-walled threaded tubing, usually made of coated steel, stainless steel or aluminum.

Galvanized rigid conduit (GRC) is galvanized steel tubing, with a tubing wall that is thick enough to allow it to be threaded. Its common applications are in commercial and industrial construction. It is designed to protect wire and connectors.

Intermediate metal conduit (IMC) is a steel tubing heavier than EMT but lighter than RMC. It may be threaded.

Electrical metallic tubing (EMT), sometimes called thin-wall, is commonly used instead of galvanized rigid conduit (GRC), as it is less costly and lighter than GRC. EMT itself is not threaded, but can be used with threaded fittings that clamp to it. Lengths of conduit are connected to each other and to equipment with clamp-type fittings. Like GRC, EMT is more common in commercial and industrial buildings than in residential applications. EMT is generally made of coated steel, though it may be aluminum.

EMT weights and dimensions (North America)
EMT sizing		Nominal wt. per 100 feet (30 m)		Nominal outside diameter		Nominal wall thickness	
US	Metric	lb.	kg	in.	mm	in.	mm
1/2	16	30	13.6	0.706	17.9	0.042	1.07
3/4	21	46	20.9	0.922	23.4	0.049	1.25
1	27	67	30.4	1.163	29.5	0.057	1.45
1 1/4	35	101	45.8	1.51	38.4	0.065	1.65
1 1/2	41	116	52.6	1.74	44.2	0.065	1.65
2	53	148	67.1	2.197	55.8	0.065	1.65
2 1/2	63	216	98	2.875	73	0.072	1.83
3	78	263	119.3	3.5	88.9	0.072	1.83
3 1/2	91	349	158.3	4	101.6	0.083	2.11
4	103	393	178.2	4.5	114.3	0.083	2.11

EMT is available in trade sizes 1/2" through 4", and 10′ and 20′ lengths.

Some manufacturers also produce EMT in a range of colors for easy system identification.

Aluminum conduit, similar to galvanized steel conduit, is a rigid tube, generally used in commercial and industrial applications where a higher resistance to corrosion is needed. Such locations would include food processing plants, where large amounts of water and cleaning chemicals would make galvanized conduit unsuitable. Aluminum cannot be directly embedded in concrete, since the metal reacts with the alkalis in cement. The conduit may be coated to prevent corrosion by incidental contact with concrete. Aluminum conduit is generally lower cost than steel in addition to having a lower labor cost to install, since a length of aluminum conduit will have about one-third the weight of an equally-sized rigid steel conduit.

=== Non-metal ===
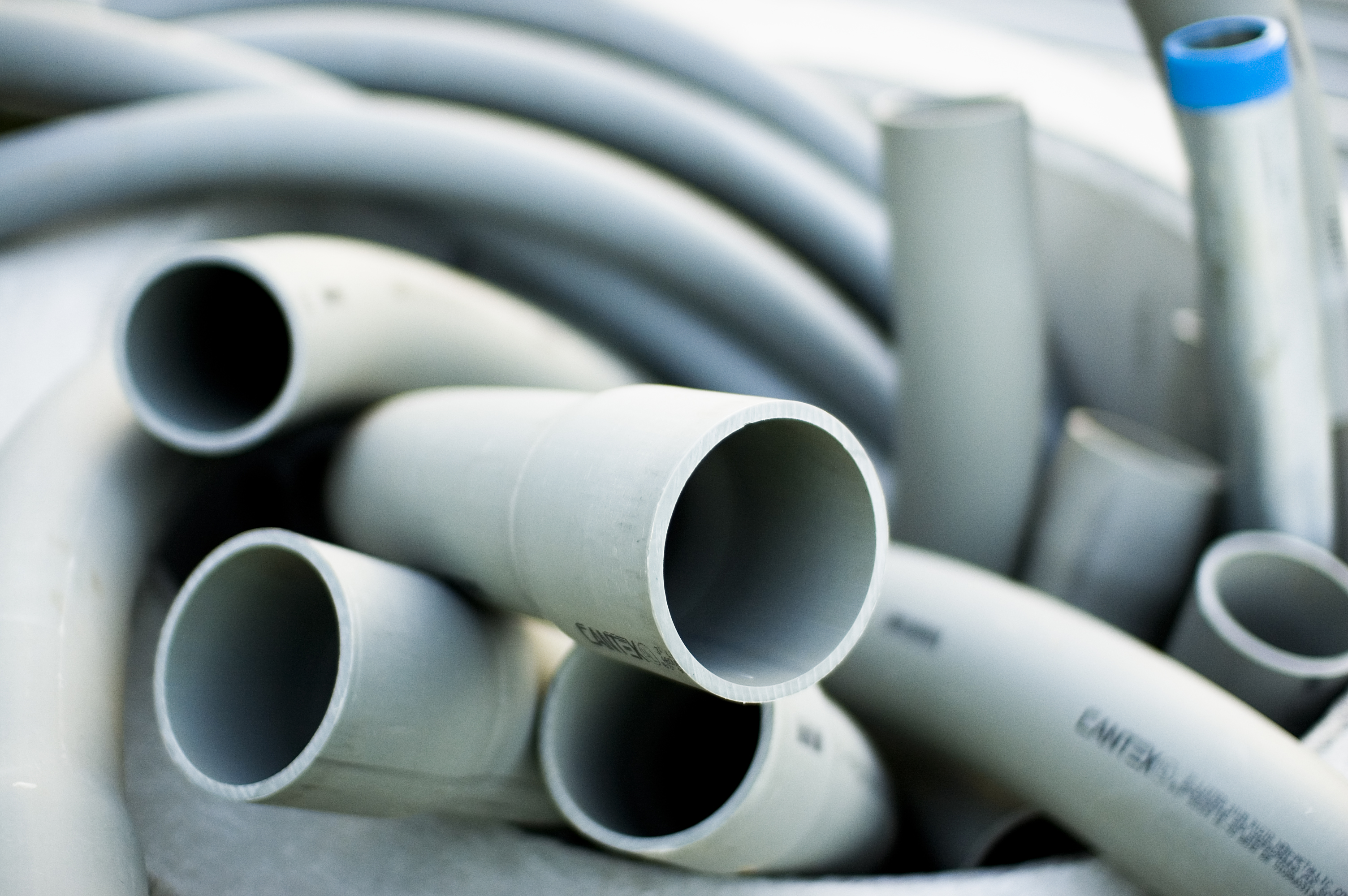
Plastic tubing for use as electrical conduit

PVC conduit has long been considered the lightest in weight compared to steel conduit materials, and usually lower in cost than other forms of conduit. In North American electrical practice, it is available in thirteen different size and wall thicknesses, with the thin-wall variety only suitable for embedded use in concrete, and heavier grades suitable for direct burial and exposed work. Most of the various fittings made for metal conduit are also available in PVC form. The plastic material resists moisture and many corrosive substances, but since the tubing is non-conductive an extra bonding (grounding) conductor must be pulled into each conduit. PVC conduit may be heated and bent in the field, by using special heating tools designed for the purpose.

Joints to fittings are made with slip-on solvent-welded connections, which set up rapidly after assembly and attain full strength in about one day. Since slip-fit sections do not need to be rotated during assembly, the special union fittings used with threaded conduit (such as Ericson) are not required. Since PVC conduit has a higher coefficient of thermal expansion than other types, it must be mounted to allow for expansion and contraction of each run. Care should be taken when installing PVC underground in multiple or parallel run configurations due to mutual heating effect of densely packed cables, because the conduit will deform when heated.

==== LSZH conduit ====
Low Smoke Zero Halogen Conduit: This new kind of electrical conduit is generally made of plastics such as PP or PE.

In the industry, it has many names, summarized in the following table:

LSZH Conduit Industry Abbreviations List
Abbreviations	Meaning
LSZH	Low smoke, zero halogen
LSF	Low smoke, fume
LSOH (LS0H)	Low smoke, zero (0) halogen
LSHF(LSFH)	Low smoke, halogen-free (free of halogen)
LSNH	Low smoke, non-halogen
NHFR	Non-halogen, flame retardant
HFFR	Halogen-free, flame retardant
ZHFR	Zero Halogen, Flame Retardant
OHLS	Zero Halogen, Flame Retardant
HFT	Halogen Free and Flame Retardant, Temperature Resistant
RKHF	RK means wall thickness, Halogen Free

It is a new type of plastic wire conduit in the industry. Compared with PVC electrical conduit, it has three advantages:

1. low smoke. Due to the unique material and formula, LSZH conduit only produces a small amount of black smoke when burning, and most compounds will absorb heat energy and release steam when burning. Compared with the large amount of smoke produced by PVC conduits, it reduces the interference to the visual field during the combustion process by reducing the amount and density of smoke;
2. halogen-free. Unlike PVC, LSZH conduit does not release hydrogen chloride when burning, thereby reducing the possibility of being inhaled by people during combustion. In addition to being halogen-free, when the compound reaches a specific temperature, it absorbs heat energy, releases steam and does not release corrosive gases. This can make its application more extensive; for example, in new nuclear power plants, the use of LSZH cables and conduits will increase.
3. flame retardant. Due to the chemical properties mentioned in the first point, the LSZH conduit absorbs heat energy and releases steam when burning, thus achieving a flame-retardant effect. The latest products on the market and UL test results can reach UL94 V-0 flame retardant with excellent performance.

==== Reinforced thermosetting resin conduit ====
RTRC or 'fiberglass conduit' is light in weight compared to metallic conduits, which contributes to lower labor costs. It is sometimes referred to as FRE which stands for "fiberglass reinforced epoxy", however this term is a legally registered trademark of FRE Composites. It may also provide lower material cost. RTRC conduit can be used in a variety of indoor and outdoor applications. Fiberglass conduit is available in multiple wall thicknesses to suit various applications and has a support distance very similar to steel. High temperature, low smoke, no flame, classified area (Class I Division 2), and zero halogen versions are also manufactured for specialty applications such as subway tunnels and stations and in the US can meet National Fire Protection Association (NFPA) 130 requirements. Like other non-metallic conduits, a bonding conductor may be required for grounding. Joints are epoxy-glued, which requires some installation labor and time for joints to set. RTRC conduit may not be bent in the field and appropriate fittings must be used to change directions, nor is RTRC conduit approved to support luminaires.

==== Rigid nonmetallic conduit ====
RNC is a non-metallic unthreaded smooth-walled tubing.

==== Electrical nonmetallic tubing ====
ENT is a thin-walled corrugated tubing that is moisture-resistant and flame retardant. It is pliable such that it can be bent by hand, and is often flexible although the fittings are not. It is not threaded due to its corrugated shape, although some fittings might be.

=== Flexible ===
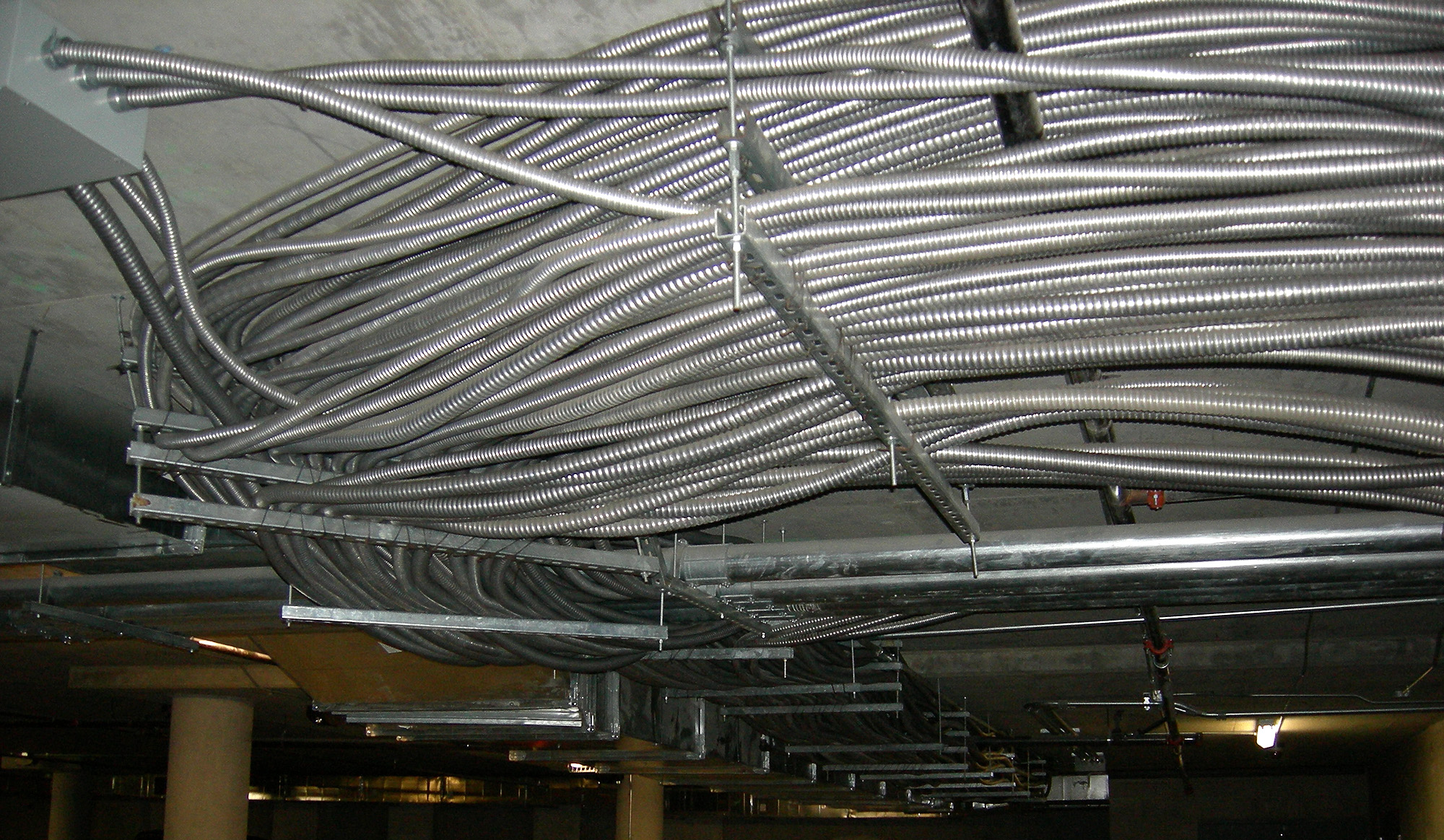
Flexible metallic conduit used in an underground parking facility

Flexible conduits are used to connect to motors or other devices where isolation from vibration is useful, or where an excessive number of fittings would be needed to use rigid connections. Electrical codes may restrict the length of a run of some types of flexible conduit.

Flexible metallic conduit (FMC, informally called greenfield or flex) is made by the helical coiling of a self-interlocked ribbed strip of aluminum or steel, forming a hollow tube through which wires can be pulled. FMC is used primarily in dry areas where it would be impractical to install EMT or other non-flexible conduit, yet where metallic strength to protect conductors is still required. The flexible tubing does not maintain any permanent bend, and can flex freely.

FMC may be used as an equipment grounding conductor if specific provisions are met regarding the trade size and length of FMC used, depending on the amperage of the circuits contained in the conduit. In general, an equipment grounding conductor must be pulled through the FMC with an ampacity suitable to carry the fault current likely imposed on the largest circuit contained within the FMC.

Liquidtight flexible metal conduit (LFMC) is a metallic flexible conduit covered by a waterproof plastic coating. The interior is similar to FMC.

Flexible metallic tubing (FMT; North America) is not the same as flexible metallic conduit (FMC) which is described in US National Electrical Code (NEC) Article 348. FMT is a raceway, but not a conduit and is described in a separate NEC Article 360. It only comes in 1/2" & 3/4" trade sizes, whereas FMC is sized 1/2" ~ 4" trade sizes. NEC 360.2 describes it as: "A raceway that is circular in cross section, flexible, metallic and liquidtight without a nonmetallic jacket."

Liquidtight flexible nonmetallic conduit (LFNC) refers to several types of flame-resistant non-metallic tubing. Interior surfaces may be smooth or corrugated. There may be integral reinforcement within the conduit wall. It is also known as FNMC.

=== Underground ===
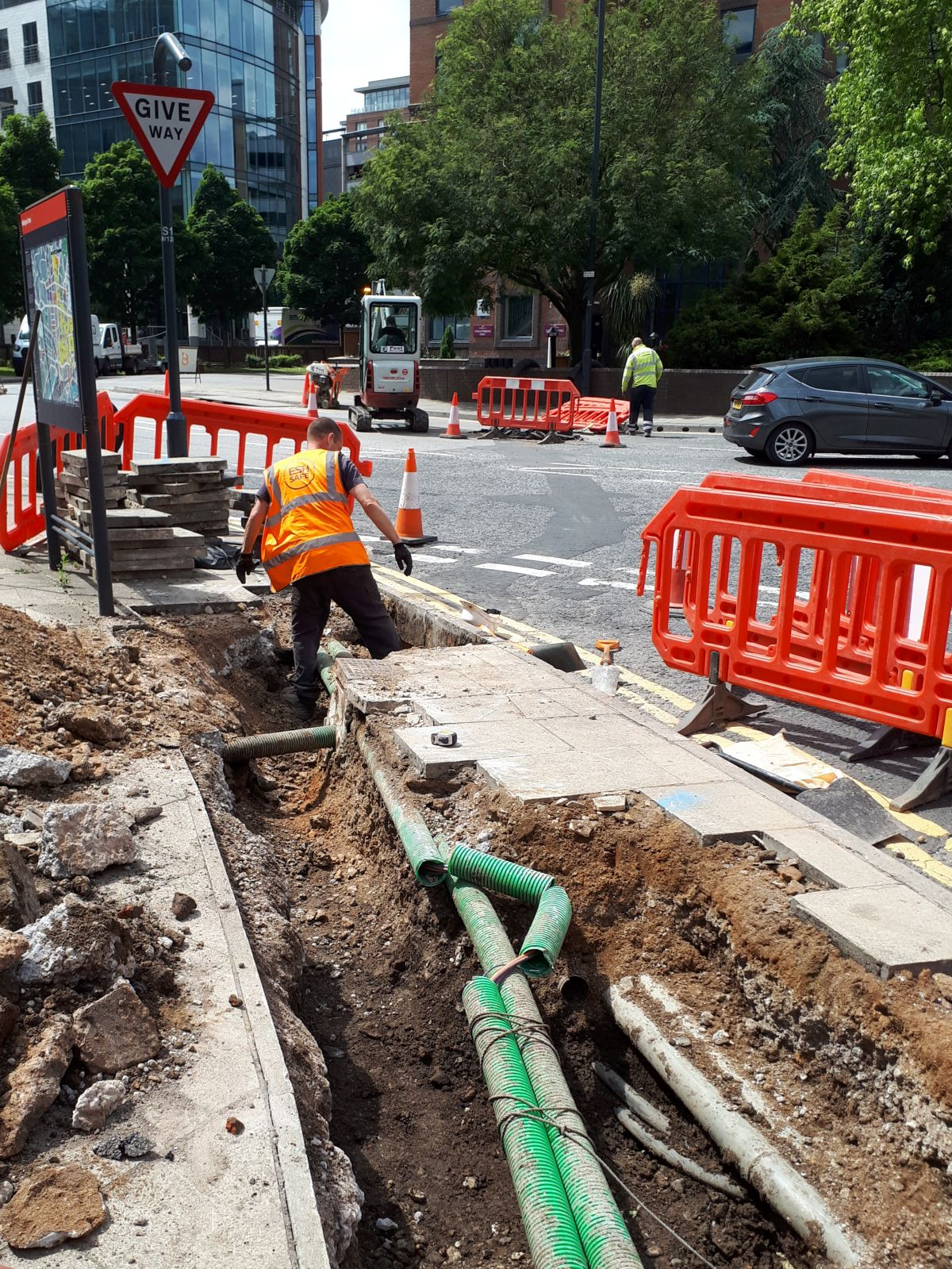
Laying cable ducts in a street in England

Conduit may be installed underground between buildings, structures, or devices to allow installation of power and communication cables. An assembly of these conduits, often called a duct bank, may either be directly buried in earth, or encased in concrete (sometimes with reinforcing rebar to aid against shear forces). Alternatively, a duct bank may be installed in a utility tunnel. A duct bank will allow replacement of damaged cables between buildings or additional power and communications circuits to be added, without the expense of re-excavation of a trench. While metal conduit is occasionally used for burial, usually PVC, polyethylene or polystyrene plastics are now used due to lower cost, easier installation, and better resistance to corrosion.

Formerly, compressed asbestos fiber mixed with cement (such as transite) was used for some underground installations. Telephone and communications circuits were typically installed in fired-clay conduit.

=== Cost comparison ===
Cost relative to rigid galvanized steel (RGS) conduit, 3/4 inch (21 metric) size
Type	Labor	Weight	Material cost
RMC	1.0	1.0	1.0
Aluminum	0.89	0.55	0.99
IMC	0.89	0.76	0.84
EMT	0.62	0.42	0.35
PVC	0.55	0.20	0.43

Exact ratios of installation labor, weight and material cost vary depending on the size of conduit, but the values for 3/4 inch (21 metric) trade size (North America) are representative.

== Fittings ==
Despite the similarity to pipes used in plumbing, purpose-designed electrical fittings are used to connect conduit.

Box connectors join conduit to a junction box or other electrical box. A typical box connector is inserted into a knockout in a junction box, with the threaded end then being secured with a ring (called a lock nut) from within the box, as a bolt would be secured by a nut. The other end of the fitting usually has a screw or compression ring which is tightened down onto the inserted conduit. Fittings for non-threaded conduits are either secured with set screws or with a compression nut that encircles the conduit. Fittings for general purpose use with metal conduits may be made of die-cast zinc, but where stronger fittings are needed, they are made of copper-free aluminum or cast iron.

Couplings connect two pieces of conduit together.

Sometimes the fittings are considered sufficiently conductive to bond (electrically unite) the metal conduit to a metal junction box (thus sharing the box's ground connection); other times, grounding bushings are used which have bonding jumpers from the bushing to a grounding screw on the box.

Unlike water piping, if the conduit is to be watertight, the idea is to keep water out, not in. In this case, gaskets are used with special fittings, such as the weatherhead leading from the overhead electrical mains to the electric meter.

Flexible metal conduit usually uses fittings with a clamp on the outside of the box, just like bare cables would.

=== Conduit bodies ===
A conduit body can be used to provide pulling access in a run of conduit, to allow more bends to be made in a particular section of conduit, to conserve space where a full size bend radius would be impractical or impossible, or to split a conduit path into multiple directions. Conductors may not be spliced inside a conduit body, unless it is specifically listed for such use.

Conduit bodies differ from junction boxes in that they are not required to be individually supported, which can make them very useful in certain practical applications. Conduit bodies are commonly referred to as condulets, a term trademarked by Cooper Crouse-Hinds company, a division of Cooper Industries.

Conduit bodies come in various types, moisture ratings, and materials, including galvanized steel, aluminum, and PVC. Depending on the material, they use different mechanical methods for securing conduit. Among the types are:

- L-shaped bodies ("Ells") include the LB, LL, and LR, where the inlet is in line with the access cover and the outlet is on the back, left and right, respectively. In addition to providing access to wires for pulling, "L" fittings allow a 90 degree turn in conduit where there is insufficient space for a full-radius 90 degree sweep (curved conduit section).
- T-shaped bodies ("Tees") feature an inlet in line with the access cover and outlets to both the cover's left and right.
- C-shaped bodies ("Cees") have identical openings above and below the access cover, and are used to pull conductors in straight runs as they make no turn between inlet and outlet.
- "Service Ell" bodies (SLBs), shorter ells with inlets flush with the access cover, are frequently used where a circuit passes through an exterior wall from outside to inside.

== Other wireways ==
=== Surface mounted raceway (wire molding) ===
This type of "decorative" conduit is designed to provide an aesthetically acceptable passageway for wiring without hiding it inside or behind a wall. This is used where additional wiring is required, but where going through a wall would be difficult or require remodeling. The conduit has an open face with removable cover, secured to the surface, and wire is placed inside. Plastic raceway is often used for telecommunication wiring, such as network cables in an older structure, where it is not practical to drill through concrete block.

Advantages

- Allows adding new wiring to an existing building without removing or cutting holes into the drywall, lath and plaster, concrete, or other wall finish.
- Allows circuits to be easily locatable and accessible for future changes, thus enabling minimum effort upgrades.

Disadvantages

- Appearance may not be acceptable to all observers.

=== Trunking ===
The term trunking is used in the United Kingdom for electrical wireways, generally rectangular in cross section with removable lids.

Mini trunking is a term used in the UK for small form-factor (usually 6 mm to 25 mm square or rectangle sectioned) PVC wireways. In India, this trunking is available with self-fixing tape to ease installation.

In some countries including Iran, the term 'Trunking' is a channel that allows installation of switches and sockets.

In North American practice, wire trough and lay-in wireways are terms used to designate similar products. Wall duct raceway is the term for the type that can be enclosed in a wall.

=== Innerducts ===
Innerducts are subducts that can be installed in existing underground conduit systems to provide clean, continuous, low-friction paths for placing optical cables, which have relatively low pulling tension limits. They provide a means for subdividing conventional conduit that was originally designed for single, large-diameter metallic conductor cables into multiple channels for smaller optical cables.

Innerducts are typically small-diameter, semi-flexible subducts. According to Telcordia GR-356, there are three basic types of innerduct: smoothwall, corrugated, and ribbed. These various designs are based on the profile of the inside and outside diameters of the innerduct. The need for a specific characteristic or combination of characteristics, such as pulling strength, flexibility, or the lowest coefficient of friction, dictates the type of innerduct required.

Beyond the basic profiles or contours (smoothwall, corrugated, or ribbed), innerduct is also available in an increasing variety of multiduct designs. Multiduct may be either a composite unit consisting of up to four or six individual innerducts that are held together by some mechanical means, or a single extruded product having multiple channels through which to pull several cables. In either case, the multiduct is coilable, and can be pulled into existing conduit in a manner similar to that of conventional innerduct.

== Passive fire protection ==
Conduit is of relevance to both firestopping, where they become penetrants, and fireproofing, where circuit integrity measures can be applied on the outside to keep the internal cables operational during an accidental fire. The British standard BS 476 also considers internal fires, whereby the fireproofing must protect the surroundings from cable fires. Any external treatments must consider the effect upon ampacity derating due to internal heat buildup.

== Conduit bender ==
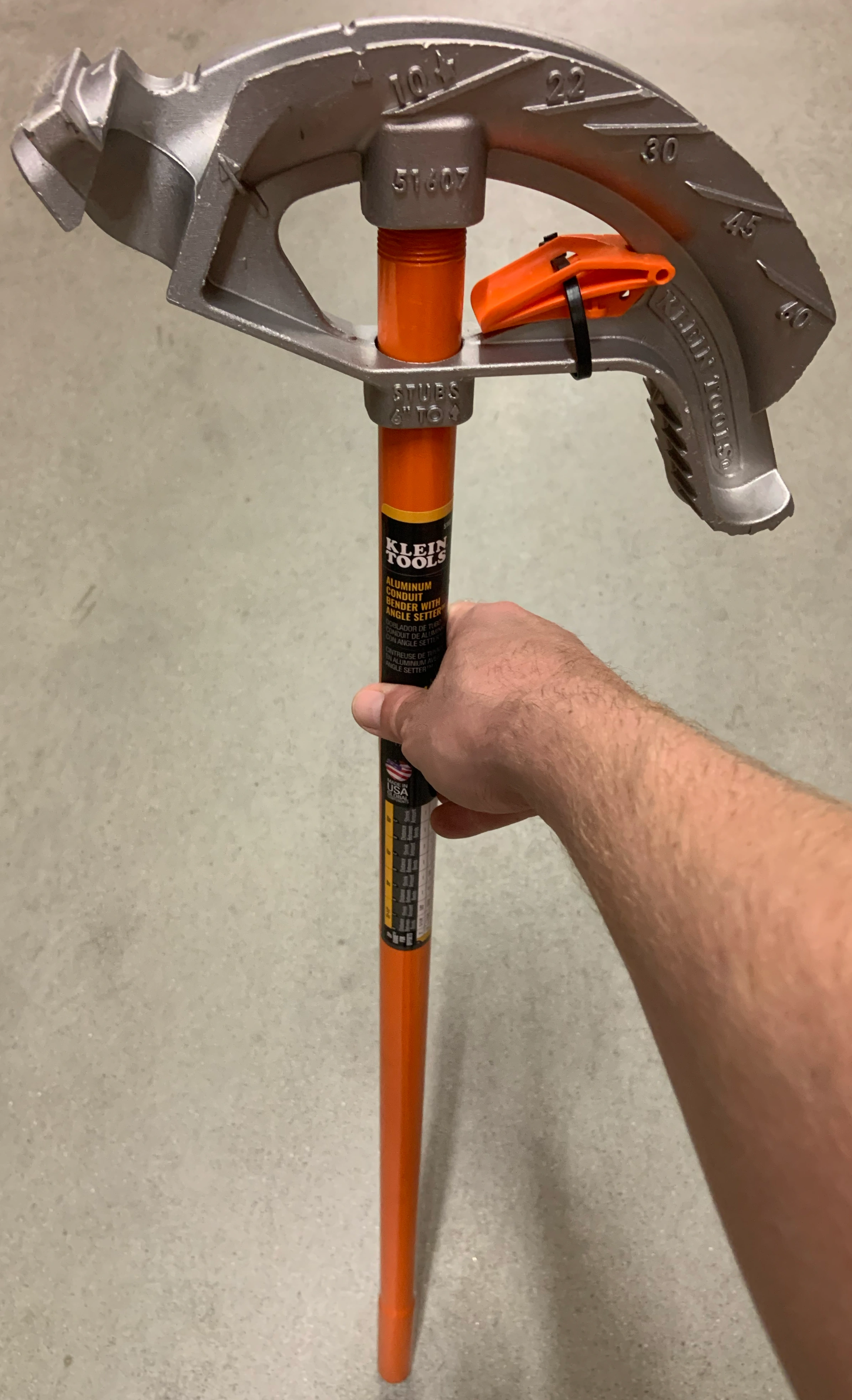
Conduit bender

A conduit bender is a tool used in electrical wiring to bend sections of electrical conduit to the required angle. Benders are commonly designed for electrical metallic tubing (EMT), but models also exist for rigid conduit and PVC conduit. Hand benders are typically sized for 1/2-inch to 1-inch diameter conduit, while larger conduit often requires mechanical or hydraulic benders. Conduit bending allows electricians to route wiring around obstacles and maintain a clean installation without using excessive fittings.

== See also ==
- Panzergewinde
- Threaded pipe

== Bibliography ==
- Cauldwell, Rex (2002). Wiring a House (For Pros By Pros). Newtown, CT, US: Taunton Press. ISBN 1-56158-527-0.
