= Power Distribution Equipment Identification =

The Power Distribution Equipment Identification (PDEID) (Persian: کد شناسایی یکپارچه توزیع) is a unique identification label used for exclusively identifying equipment and customers of the power distribution network of Iran, which has been in use since 1997. PDEID is used to simplify identifying equipment, their approximate address, updating the electrical network information and to transfer information to computers.

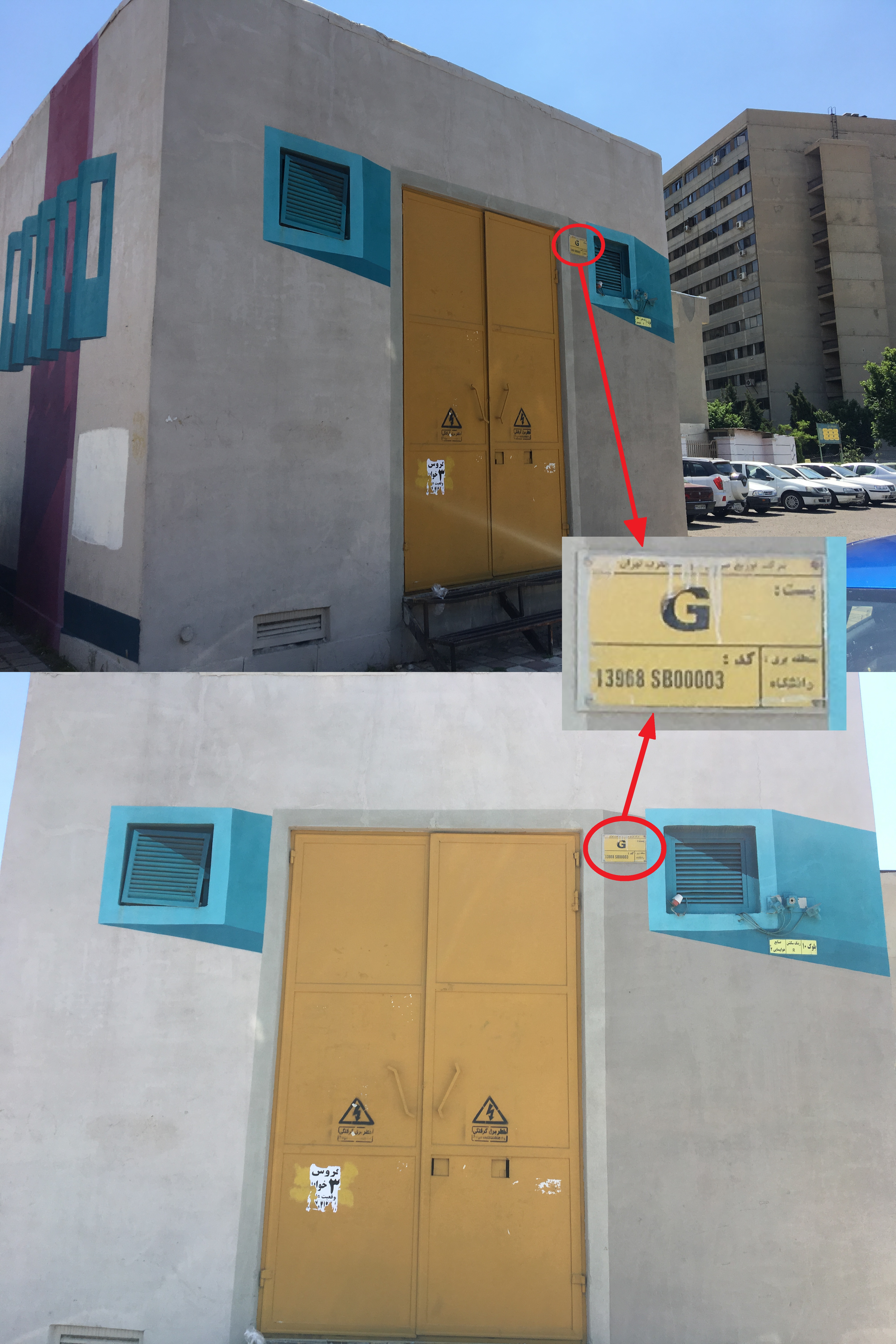
Power Distribution Equipment Identification label (13968SB00003) installed on wall of a distribution substation in Tehran, Iran

== Etymology ==
The first unique identification code for equipment was introduced in the Iran's Power Distribution Network Standard in 1969. Only three equipment which were medium and low voltage poles, medium and low voltage branching nodes and distribution substations suggested to have equipment identification label. In 1996, at the 6th Conference on Electrical Power Distribution Networks, an article entitled "Application of the Integrated Equipment Identification Label for Distribution Networks in the Iran" by Gholamreza Saffarpour (Persian: غلامرضا صفارپور) and Ali Mamdoohi (Persian: علی ممدوحی) was presented in which a method for uniquely identifying all equipment and subscribers of distribution networks introduced. This method was selected in 1997 with minor modifications by Tavanir to integrate the identification of equipment and subscribers of distribution networks.

== Structure of Power Distribution Equipment Identification Label ==
Every code in the Power Distribution Equipment Identification label consists of 12 numbers and letters. The labels are grouped into two categories: network equipment and customers.

=== Distribution Equipment Identification for network equipment ===
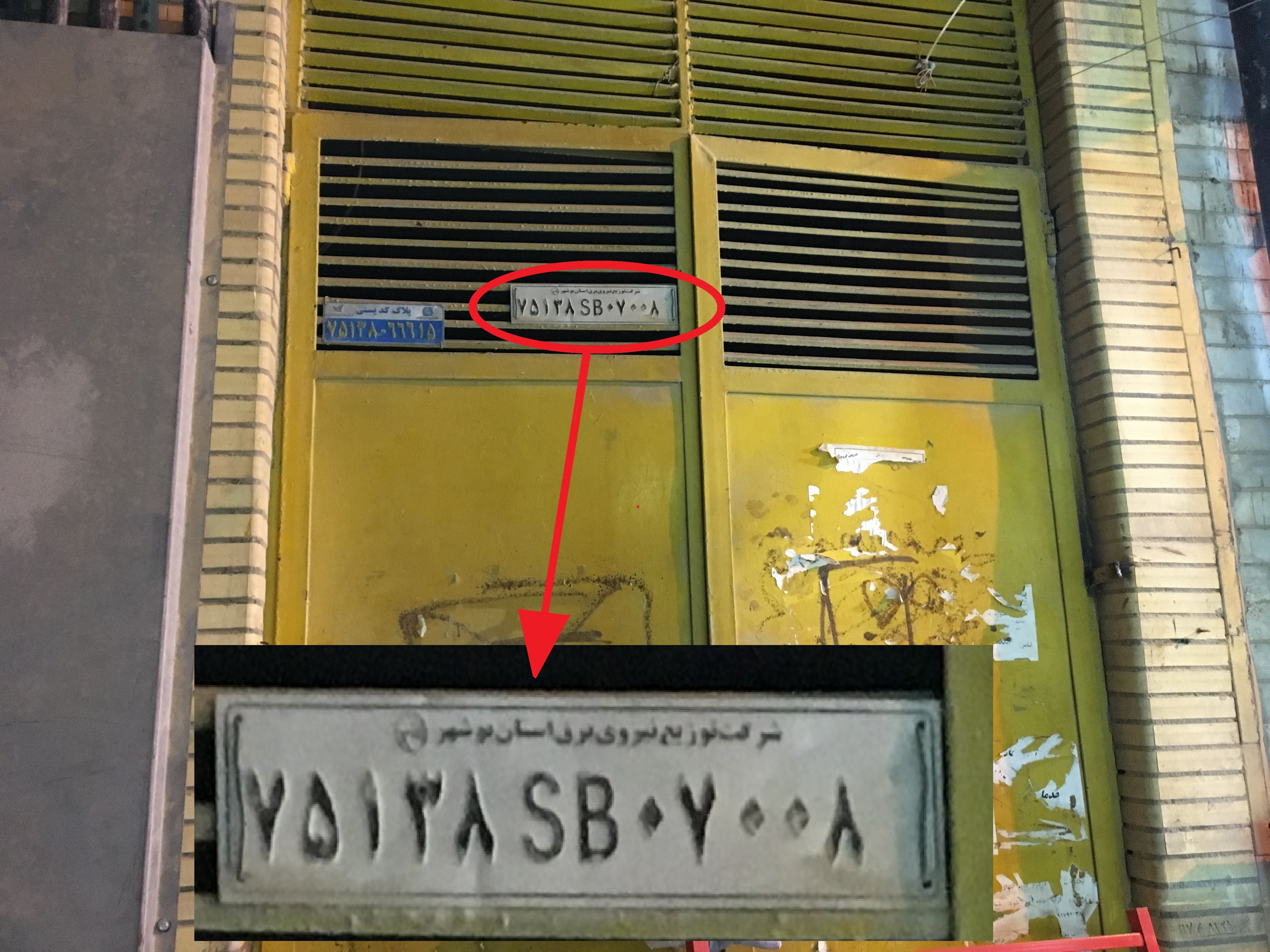
A distribution substation in Bushehr, Iran (bazaar area) with the PDEID label 75138SB07008

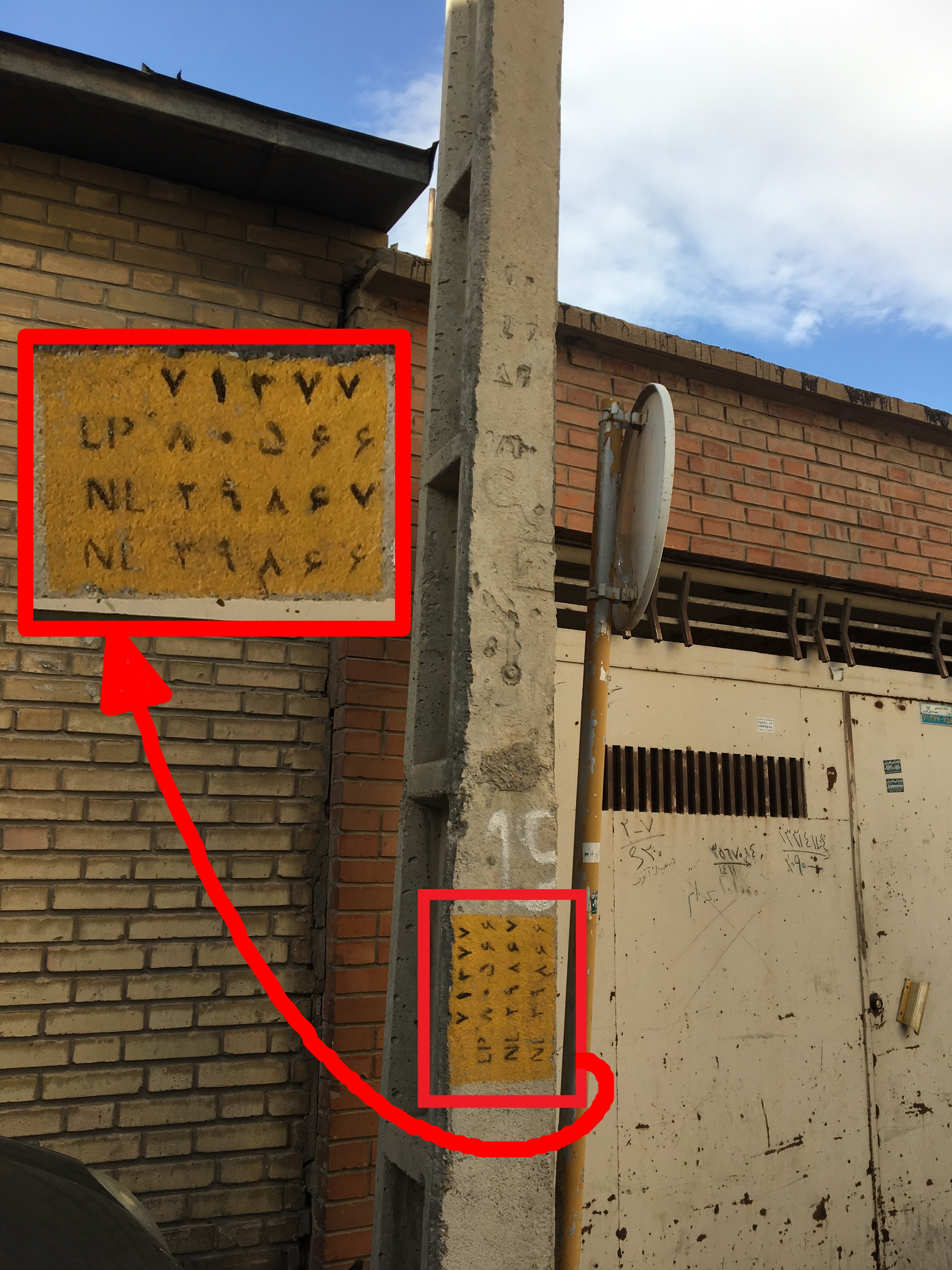
Pole with double circuit LV line in Shiraz (Iran) has PDEID labels installed: 71377LP80566 for pole 71377NL29866 for first circuit 71377NL29867 for second circuit

The equipment label contains 12 numbers and characters. The first 5 identifies the zip code of the area where the equipment is located. The 5-digit postcode contains the location information provided by Iran Post for the whole country. The next two are letters which identify the equipment type-ID. The last five digits are an assigned sequence (or serial) number for the equipment in the postcode area.

The sequence or serial number used in the integrated PDEID is an arbitrary number that is unique within the area of postcode. For example, the first distribution substation in the 13457 postcode should have the serial number 00001 and the second substation in the same postcode area (13457) should have serial number 00002, and so on. In this system, determining which equipment (substation in the above example) is first and which one is second is absolutely arbitrary.

PDEID for Equipment
1	3	9	6	8	S	B	0	0	0	0	3
Postcode (ZIP Code)					Equipment Type ID		Sequence Number				

=== Distribution Equipment Identification for customers (subscribers) ===
For customers the Power Distribution Equipment Identification label is composed of 12 digits, and similar to the equipment, the 5 leftmost digits are the 5-digit postcode of the area where the electricity meter of the customer is located. The right 7 digits of the PDEID are the customer-id which is used in the billing system of power distribution utilities. In some parts of the Iran where the customer-id is more than 7 digits, the PDEID has 14 digits, and the 9 rightmost digits contain the customer-id number.

PDEID for customers (subscribers)
1	3	9	6	8	1	2	3	4	5	6	7
Postcode (ZIP Code)					Billing System Customer-id						

=== Equipment Type ID ===
In the Power Distribution Equipment Identification label, identification is not considered for all equipment. However, by identifying and labeling 23 equipment, all equipment which is important in regard to engineering calculations or information statistics can be uniquely identified. Equipment type-ID does not include the letters I (i), O (o), and Q (q) to avoid confusion with numerals 1 and 0.

	Equipment Name	Equipment Type Id	Notes
1	HV Pole	HP	Distribution poles do not have specific voltage. When poles are used in a HV network, the HP type id will be used for them, although it may have LV network.
2	HV Pole	LP	Distribution poles do not have specific voltage. When poles will have the LP type id when they have only LV network.
3	HV Busbar	HB	
4	LV Busbar	LB	
5	HV Cable Termination	CH	
6	LV Cable Termination	CL	
7	Virtual Node	JN	When two devices (e.g. cut-out fuse and transformer) are connected directly, between these two is considered a "virtual node" or "virtual connection" (JN)
8	HV Disconnector	AB	
9	HV Cable Joint	HJ	
10	LV Cable Joint	LJ	
11	LV Power Distribution Panel	SH	Also known as LV power box or LV feeder pillar
12	Pole Mounted Transformer	AT	
13	Ground Mounted Transformer	GT	Transformers installed in any type of enclosed substations consisting of pad mounted substation, underground distribution substation, substation inside a building
14	Distribution Box	DB	
15	Recloser	RC	
16	Sectionalizer	SC	
17	Autobooster	VR	Also known as Automatic Voltage Regulator Autotransformer
18	Light Pole	SL	
19	Ground Mounted Substation	SB	Any type of enclosed substations consisting of pad mounted substation, underground distribution substation, substation inside a building
20	Pole Mounted Substation	SP	
21	Circuit Breaker	СВ	
22	LV Overhead Transmission Line Insulator	NL	All insulators which are connected to an LV distribution line over a pole take one LV Type ID. For example In a 3 phase LV line with neutral wire, all 4 insulator take just one PDEID (xxxxxNLxxxxx)
23	HV Overhead Transmission Line Insulator	NH	All insulators which are connected to an HV distribution line over a pole take one HV Type ID. For example In a 3 phase HV line, all 3 insulator take just one PDEID (xxxxxNHxxxxx)

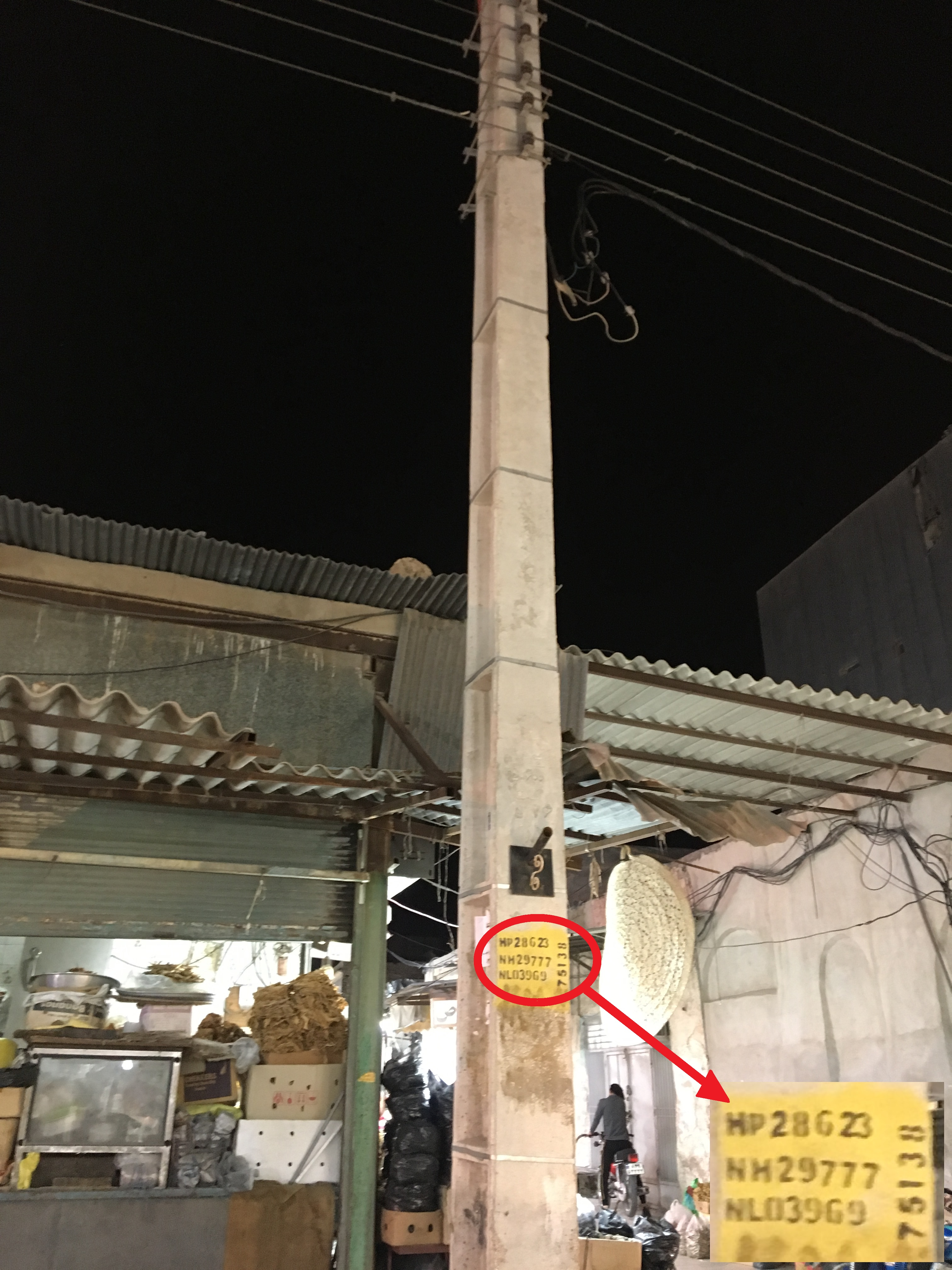
Pole with both HV and LV lines in Bushehr (Iran) has PDEID labels installed: 75138HP28623 for pole 75138NH29777 for HV line insulators 75138NL03969 for LV line insulators

In assigning PDEID to the distribution equipment, a single-line diagram is used, so when the three-phase system is used, insulators, cable terminations, and cable joints of all three phases take just one PDEID each.

== Changes to the original design ==
There are three differences between the final implemented PDEID and what was proposed in the article entitled "Application of the Integrated Equipment Identification Label for Distribution Networks in the Iran” as following:

1. Suggested outdoor HV cable termination type id was C1, and indoor HV cable termination type id was C3. In final PDEID type id of both outdoor and indoor HV cable termination is CH.
2. Suggested outdoor LV cable termination type id was C2, and indoor LV cable termination type id was C4. In final PDEID type id of both outdoor and indoor HV cable termination is CL.
3. Adding the JN type id for virtual node.

Also to improve the readability of the labels, the type id is placed between the postcode (zip code) and sequence number (or customer id number for customers).
