= Cut-out =

Cut-out, cutout, or cut out may refer to:

- Cutout animation
- Cutout (electric power distribution), a combination fuse and knife switch used on power poles
- Cutout (espionage), a mechanism used to pass information
- Cut-out (philately), an imprinted stamp cut from an item of postal stationery
- Cut-out (recording industry), deeply discounted or remaindered recordings
- Cut out of a scene to make a film editing transition
- Naval boarding of a ship by small boats
- Sleeveless shirt
- Standee a cut-out figurine used in merchandising
- Texture bitmap with a transparent background used in 3D graphics to simulate complex geometry
