= Live-line working =

Electrical equipment maintenance

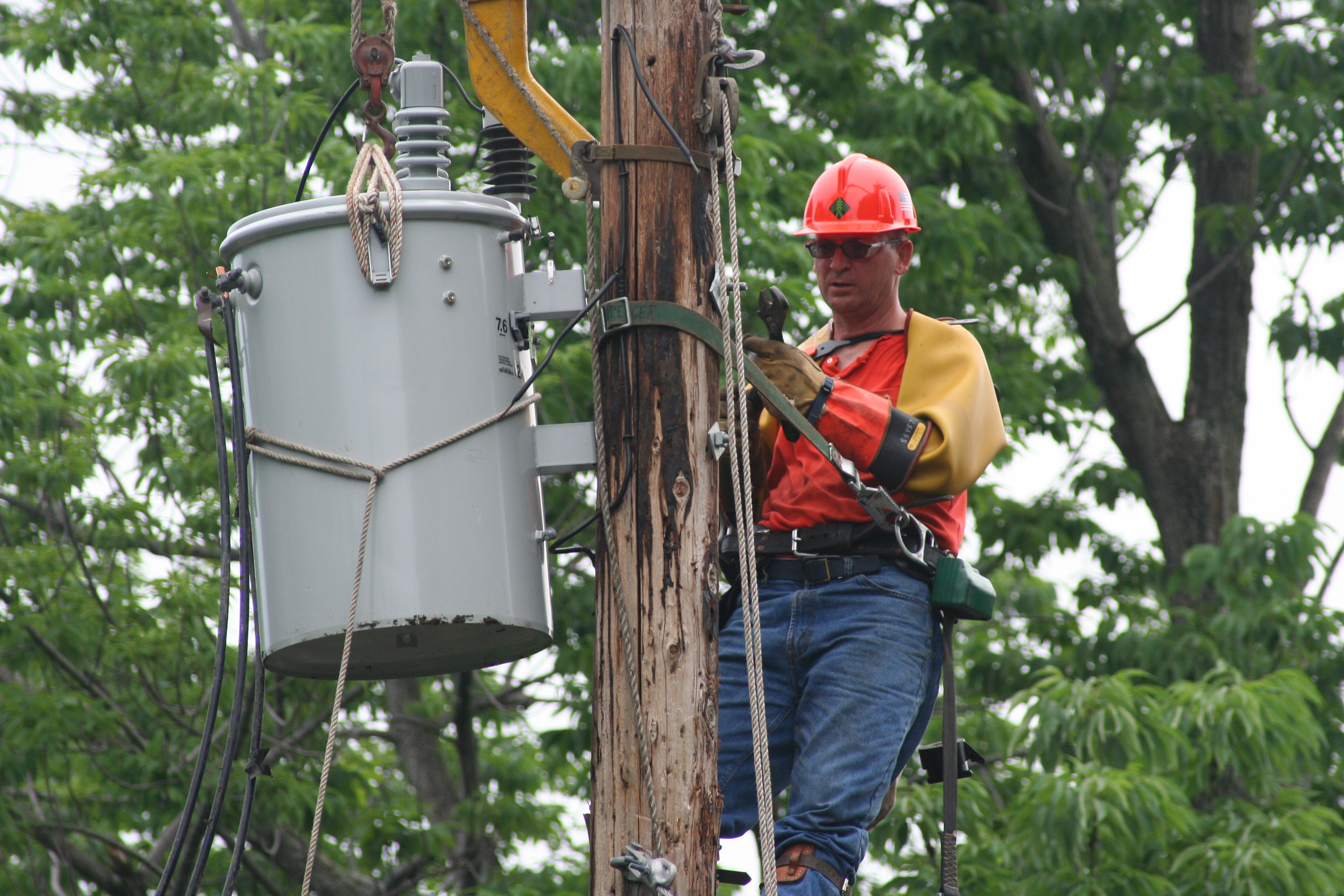
A lineman wearing equipment for hot glove work

In electrical engineering, live-line working, also known as hotline maintenance, is the maintenance of electrical equipment, often operating at high voltage, while the equipment is energised. Although this is more hazardous for personnel than working on electrical equipment with the power off, live-line maintenance techniques are used in the electric power distribution industry to avoid the disruption and high economic costs of having to turn off power to customers to perform essential periodic maintenance on transmission lines and other equipment.

The first techniques for live-line working were developed in the early years of the 20th century, and both equipment and work methods were later refined to deal with increasingly higher voltages. In the 1960s, methods were developed in the laboratory to enable field workers to come into direct contact with high voltage lines. Such methods can be applied to enable safe work at the highest transmission voltages.

== Background ==
In general, it is impossible to determine visually whether electrical equipment is energized; in any event, it is often necessary to maintain or repair circuits while they are in operation. In addition, at high voltages, it is unnecessary to come into direct contact with charged equipment to be shocked because an arc can jump from the equipment to a tool or part of the body. Materials such as rubber, while excellent insulators, are also subject to electrical failure at high voltages.

== Methods ==
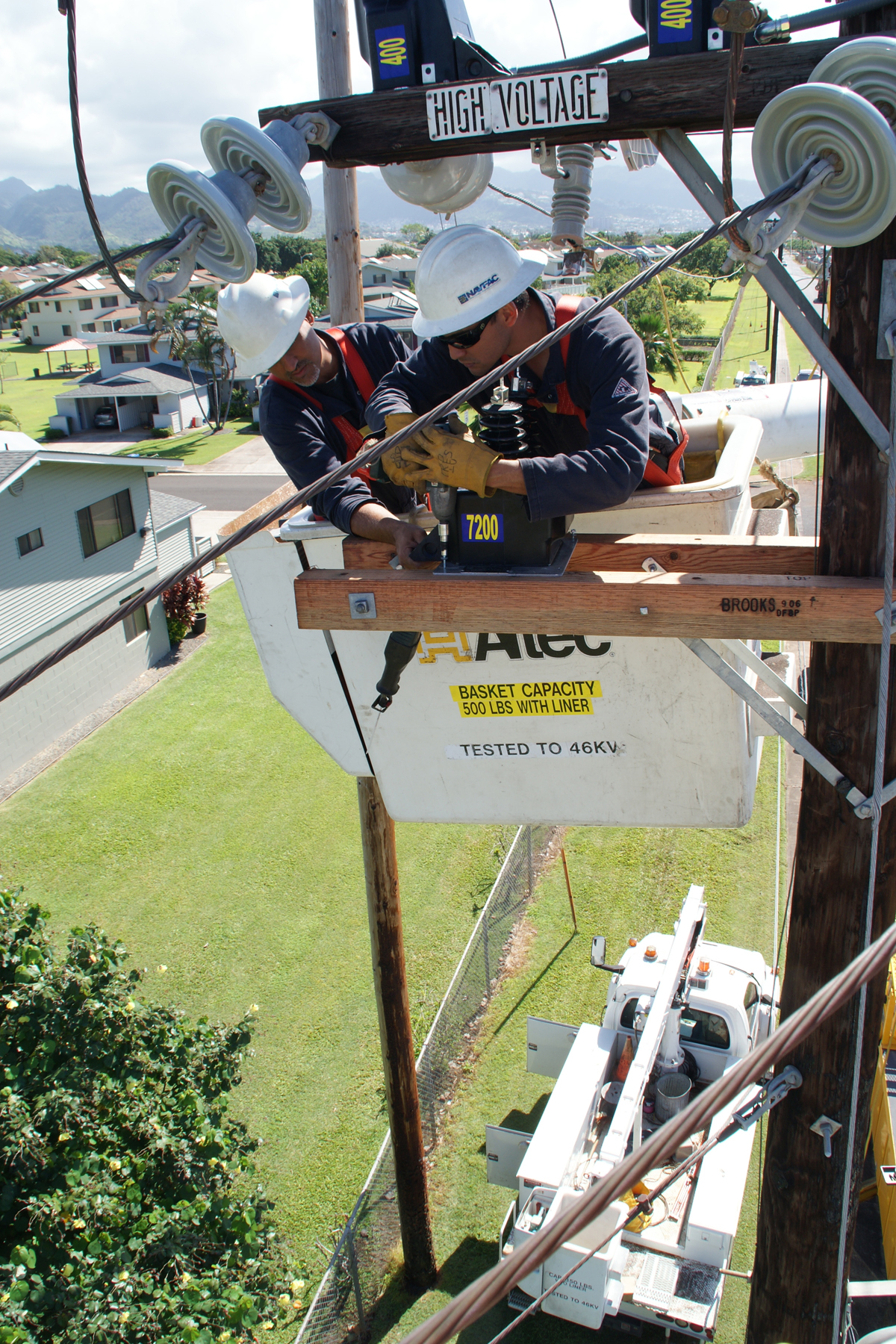
Working under tension from an electrically insulating platform in a medium voltage network

In general, there are three methods of live-line working which help workers avoid the considerable hazards of live line working. In various ways, they all serve to prevent current flowing from the live equipment through the worker.

Hot stick or Live Line Tool
Hot sticks are used in live line work by having the worker remain at a specified distance from the live parts and carry out the work by means of an insulating stick. Tools can be attached to the stick, allowing work to be performed with the worker safely away from the live conductors.
Insulating Gloves or Rubber Gloves
A live line worker is electrically protected by insulating gloves and other insulating equipment, and carries out the work in direct mechanical contact with live parts.
Barehand or Potential
The barehanded approach has a live line worker performing the work in direct electric contact with live parts. Before contact, the worker's body is raised to the same electric potential as the live parts, and then held there by electric connection, while maintaining suitable isolation from the surroundings which are at different potentials, like the ground, other people or trees. Because the worker and the work are at the same potential, no current flows through the worker.
Unearthed or De-energised
Some organizations additionally consider working on unearthed de-energised equipment to be another form of live-line working. This is because the line might become inadvertently charged (e.g. through a back-charged transformer, possibly as a result of an improperly connected, inadequately isolated emergency generator at a customer facility), or inductively coupled from an adjacent in-service line. To prevent this, the line is first grounded via a clamp known as a bond or drain earth. Once this is in place, further work is not considered to be live-line working.

=== Hot stick ===
Hot-stick working appeared in the second decade of the 20th century, when insulating poles made from baked wood were used for tasks such as replacing fuses, replacing post insulators, and transferring lines onto temporary supports. The sticks enabled the linemen to carry out the work without infringing on the minimum clearance distances from live equipment. As experience with the techniques developed, then the operating voltages at which the work was performed increased. With the advent of fibreglass poles in the late 1950s, which neither split nor soaked up rainwater, utilities were prepared to carry out hot-stick working to their highest operating voltages, perhaps 765 kV.

Tools, such as hooks or socket wrenches can be mounted at the end of the pole. More sophisticated poles can accept pneumatically or hydraulically driven power tools which allow, for example, bolts to be unscrewed remotely. A rotary wire brush allows a terminal to be scoured clean before a connection is made. However, a worker's dexterity is naturally reduced when operating tools at the end of a pole that is several metres long.

=== Insulating glove or rubber glove working ===
Usually applied for work above 1 kV AC 1.5 kV DC The primary classes are:

- Class 00 – phase to phase working voltage 500 V
- Class 0 – phase to phase working voltage 1.0 kV
- Class 1 – phase to phase working voltage 7.5 kV
- Class 2 – phase to phase working voltage 17 kV
- Class 3 – phase to phase working voltage 26.5 kV
- Class 4 – phase to phase working voltage 36 kV

Gloves protect the worker from exposure to the live part being worked upon sometimes referred to as the 1st point of contact; the point where current would enter the body should an inadvertent contact be made. Covers of insulating material such as blankets and linehose are employed in rubber glove working to protect the worker from exposure to a part at a different potential sometimes referred to as the 2nd point of contact; the point where current would leave the body should an inadvertent contact be made.

=== Bare hand ===
Bare-hand, or potential working involves placing the worker in direct electrical contact with an energized overhead line. The worker might work alongside the lines, from a platform that is suspended from them, or may sit or stand directly on the line itself. In all cases, the worker's body is maintained at the same voltage as the line. It is imperative that the worker maintain appropriate and adequate limits of approach to any part at a different potential. Such techniques were first used in 1960.

There are a number of ways in which the worker can access the live parts:

- The worker can access from a specialist type of mobile elevating work platform (MEWP) termed an insulating aerial device (IAD) which has a boom of insulating material and which all conductive parts at the platform end are bonded together. There are other requirements for safe working such as gradient control devices, a means of preventing a vacuum in the hydraulic lines, etc.
- The worker can stand on an insulating ladder which is maneuvered to the line by means of non-conductive rope.
- The worker is lowered from a helicopter and transfers themself to the line.
- The worker is brought alongside the wire in a hovering helicopter and works from that position.

As the worker approaches the line, an arc will form between the line and the worker as they are being charged. This arc can be debilitating, and the worker must immediately bond themself electrically to the line to prevent further arcing. A worker may use a conducting wand during the approach to first make the connection. Once on the line, the worker is safe from shock as both the lineworker and the wire are at the same electric potential, and hence no current passes through their body. This is the same principle as that which allows birds to safely sit on power lines.

When the work is completed, the process is reversed to remove the worker safely from the wire. Barehand working provides the lineworker with greater dexterity than the hot stick method, and may be the preferred option if conditions permit it. With this technique, insulator strings, conductor spacers and vibration dampers can be replaced, or lines spliced, without any loss of supply.

The strong electric field surrounding charged equipment is enough to drive a current of approximately 15 μA for each kV·m^{−1} through a human body. To prevent this, hot-hand workers are usually required to wear a Faraday suit. This is a set of overalls made from or woven throughout with conducting fibers. The suit is in effect a wearable Faraday cage, which equalizes the potential over the body, and ensures there is no through-tissue current. Conducting gloves, even conducting socks, are also necessary, leaving only the face uncovered.

There is little practical upper voltage limit for hot-hand working, and it has been successfully performed at some of the highest transmission operating voltages in the world, such as the Russian 1150 kV system.

=== Helicopter ===
A lineworker wearing a Faraday suit can work on live, high-power lines by being transported to the lines in a helicopter. The worker can perform maintenance sitting on an outrigger platform attached to the helicopter while the aircraft hovers next to the line. When approaching the line a long wand is touched to the line to equalize the potential of the aircraft to that of the line, then a breakaway bonding wire connected to the helicopter's frame is attached to the line during work. Alternatively the worker can transfer to the wires from the helicopter and crawl down the wires, then be picked up by the helicopter after the work is completed.

== Eye protection ==
An electric arc is extremely bright, including in the ultraviolet, and can cause arc eye, a painful and potentially blinding condition. Workers may be provided with appropriately tinted goggles that protect their vision in the event of a flash, and provide defence against debris ejected by an arc.

== See also ==
- Lineworker
