= Hot stick =

Electrician's tool

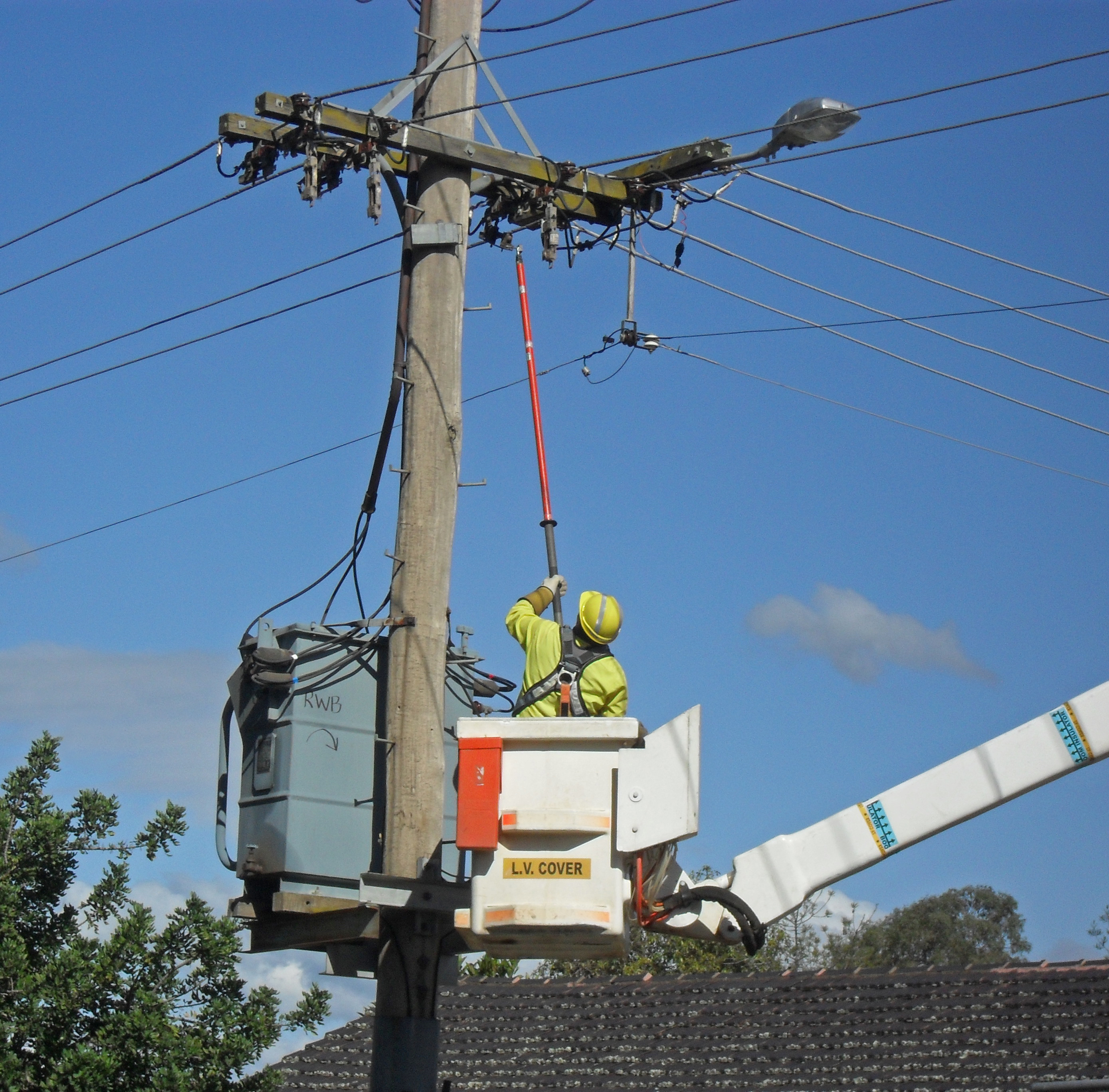
A linesman working for Country Energy in Australia closing a circuit using a hot stick

In the electric power distribution industry, a hot stick is an insulated pole, usually made of fiberglass, used by electric utility workers when engaged on live-line working on energized high-voltage electric power lines, to protect them from electric shock. Depending on the tool attached to the end of the hot stick, it is possible to test for voltage, tighten nuts and bolts, apply tie wires (twisted lengths of ductile wire which fasten the running cable to its supporting insulators), open and close switches, replace fuses, lay insulating sleeves on wires, and perform various other tasks while not exposing the crew to a large risk of electric shock.

Hot sticks are made in different lengths, from simple 3-foot (1 m) sticks to 30-foot (9 m) telescoping models. Because the fiberglass provides electrical insulation, the hot stick allows utility workers to perform operations on power lines safely without de-energizing them or while the state of the power line is not yet known. This is essential because certain operations (such as opening or closing combination fuse/switches) must occasionally be performed on an energized line. Additionally, after a fault occurs, the exact state of a line may not be certain; in this case, for reasons of crew safety, the utility workers must treat the line as though it were energized until it can be proven that it is not and safety ground cables can be applied to the line (so that the line is guaranteed to remain grounded/earthed while maintenance is performed upon it). If power tools are fitted to the end of the hot stick, they are usually powered hydraulically rather than electrically because, like the fiberglass of the hot stick, the hydraulic fluid is also a good insulator. The hydraulic power is commonly supplied from the bucket truck (cherry picker or aerial work platform) supporting the workers.

The hot stick not only electrically insulates the worker from the energized conductor, it provides physical separation from the device being operated, to reduce the chances of burns which might result from electrical arcing if there is a malfunction of the device being operated.

In the United States, ASTM Standard F 711 specifies the stringent requirements for hot sticks, and U.S. OSHA standards require that they be inspected and electrically tested every two years.

== History ==
In 1916 in Atlanta, Georgia, a tool that was known as an "electrical hook" was introduced. "This was essentially a spring-type clamp for tapping energized circuits. The electrical hook necessitated a hot stick for installation purposed, and its use suggested additional tools which were soon developed for grounding and jumper service, applying parallel groove clamps, handling conductors, pulling cotter pins and manipulating tie wires. There soon followed a hack saw, a hot line come-along, and saddles which could be attached to poles for supporting certain tools". The first accepted hot line tools were rated for 34 kV but many linemen were hesitant to use the hot stick in such operations with this high of voltage. With fear from workers hot line maintenance was restricted to 22 kV, and less. Linemen later began to realize that using hot line tools kept them at a safe distance from lines that were energized and slowly began to lose their fear of hot line work. Years later "restrictions were gradually relaxed until 1930 when several companies began permitting hot line operations to be performed on 66 kV lines. This soon rose to 110 kV until in the late Thirties the astonishing news was circulated that a West Coast line of 220 kV had been successfully worked "hot".

In March 1948 a milestone was passed "when O.G. Anderson and M.R. Parkin, Hot Line Tool Specialists of the A.B. Chance Company, changed suspension insulators on the 287 kV Hoover Dam, Los Angeles Line, using tools specially designed for the job. The A.B. Chance Company is now (1954) building tools that will successfully handle the 345 kv lines, presently under construction. At the present time there are few jobs that cannot be performed hot, and about the only limitation to this type of work results from the type of construction employed."

Early hot sticks were made from wood and need to be lightweight to prevent fatigue on linemen. Sitka spruce is the most popular wood used in the construction of hot sticks due to its light weight, strength, and excellent electrical properties. Hot sticks are now generally made from high strength plastics with an aluminum alloy head. This makes for an even lighter hot stick. "Insulation characteristics and strength of the tools are of major importance, as the linemen's safety depends upon these things. The ease with which the tool handles, the relief from fatigue, the manner in which it operates when engaging a tie wire, strain clamp insulator, or conductor are also important considerations."

== See also ==
- Fuse cutout
