= Fuse cutout =

Combination of a fuse and a switch

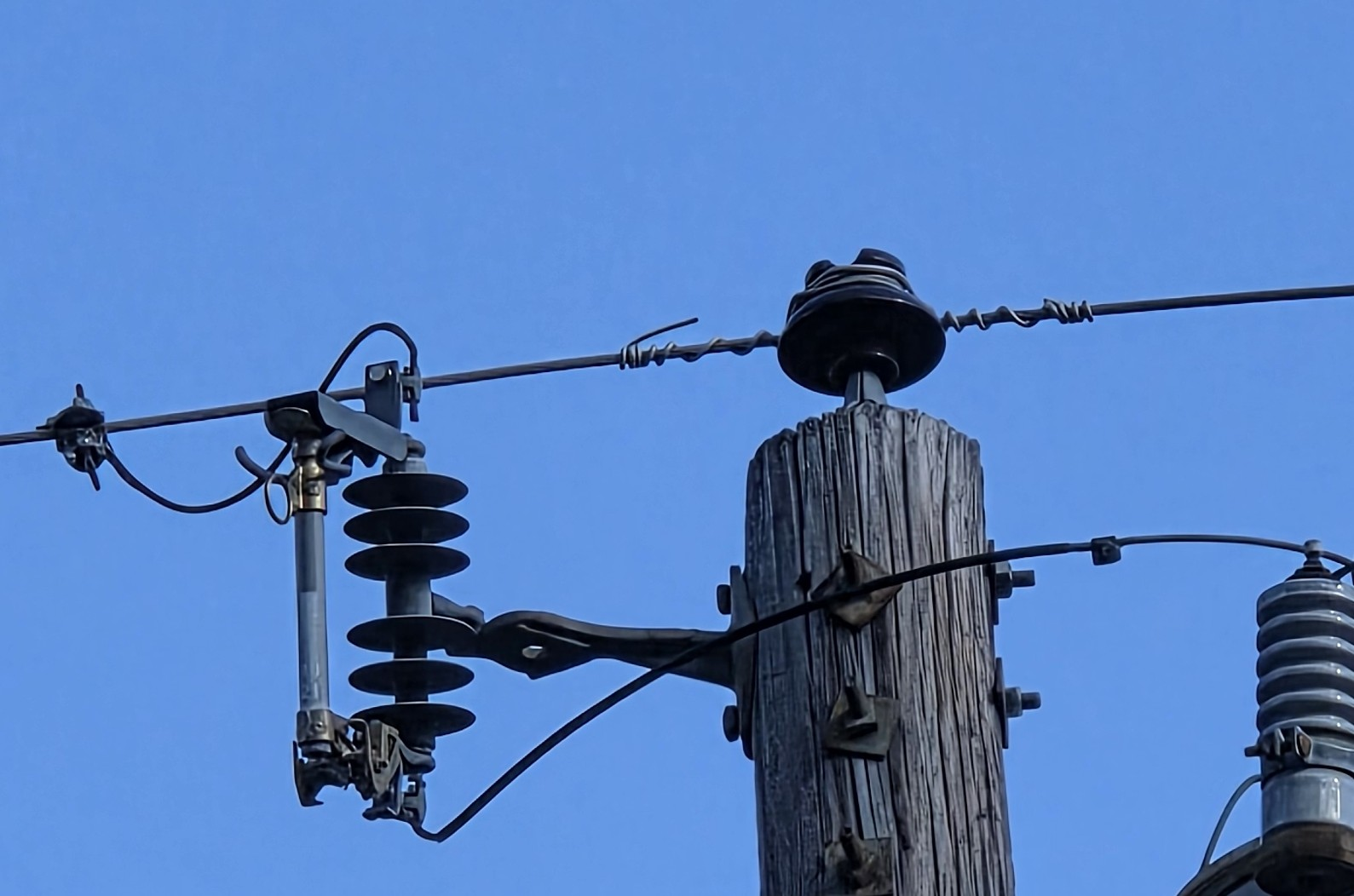
Fuse cutout (left) connects from a feeder line (top) to a transformer (bottom right)

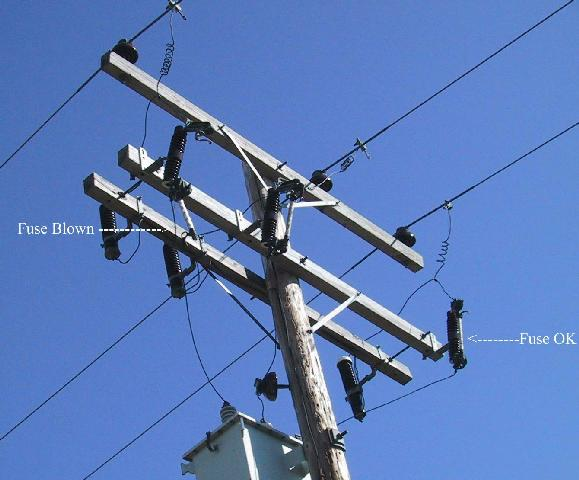
A set of pole top cutouts (with C-shaped bodies) protecting a transformer on a 12.47 kV distribution line. One fuse is blown and the tube is hanging down. Lightning arresters are mounted on the crossarm opposite the fuse cutouts.

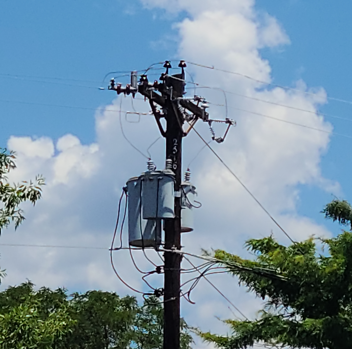
Fuse cutouts with V-shaped bodies.

In electrical distribution, a fuse cutout or cut-out fuse (often referred to as a cutout) is a combination of a fuse and a switch, used in primary overhead feeder lines and taps to protect distribution transformers from current surges and overloads. An overcurrent caused by a fault in the transformer or customer circuit will cause the fuse to melt and the switch mechanism to visibly open, disconnecting the transformer from the line. The device can also be opened manually by utility linemen standing on the ground and using a long insulating stick called a "hot stick".

== Components ==
A cutout and fuse assembly consist of three major components:

- The cutout body, an open frame that supports the fuse holder and has a ribbed porcelain or polymer insulator that electrically isolates the conductive portions of the assembly from each other and from the support to which the insulator is fastened.
- The fuse holder, also called the "fuse tube" or "door", an insulating tube which contains the replaceable fuse element. When the contained fuse melts ("blows"), it opens the circuit, and the fuse holder drops out of the upper contact and hangs from a hinge on its lower end. This hanging fuse holder provides a visible indication that the fuse has operated and assurance that the circuit is open. The circuit can also be opened manually by pulling out the fuse holder using a hot stick. The fuse holder is typically a fiberglass tube with a covering and metal contact points. As a fuse holder ages, the coating on the fiberglass will degrade and the fiberglass tube will start "shedding". The tube starts out with a pinkish hue then becomes white and then starts to "shed" fiberglass.
- The fuse element, or "fuse link", is the replaceable portion of the assembly that melts and breaks the circuit when the electric current through it exceeds its rated current value. There are many types of fuse elements for many different uses such as a type T fuse also known as a "slow-blow fuse" being used for sidelines. These fuses are typically explusion fuses that produce gas to blow the arc out the end of the tube when the fuse blows, improving their ability to interrupt a high-current fault at high voltage.

The fuse holder may be replaced by a solid blade, which would allow the fuse holder assembly to be used as a switch without providing the overcurrent protection of a fuse. Other types of fuses, such as current-limiting fuses, may also be fitted in place of the fuse holder with a replaceable expulsion-fuse element.

== Construction ==
The fuse elements used in most distribution cutouts are tin or silver alloy wires that melt when subjected to high enough current. Current ratings of fuse elements typically range from 1 ampere to 200 amperes. A solid (unfused) door will allow the full capacity of the cutout to be utilized, typically 300 A.

Cutouts are typically mounted about 20 degrees off vertical so that the center of gravity of the fuse holder is displaced and the fuse holder will rotate and fall open under its own weight when the fuse blows. Mechanical tension on the fuse link normally holds an ejector spring in a stable position. When the fuse blows, the released spring pulls the stub of the fuse link out of the fuse holder tube to reduce surge duration and damage to the transformer and fuse holder. This quenches any arc in the fuse holder.

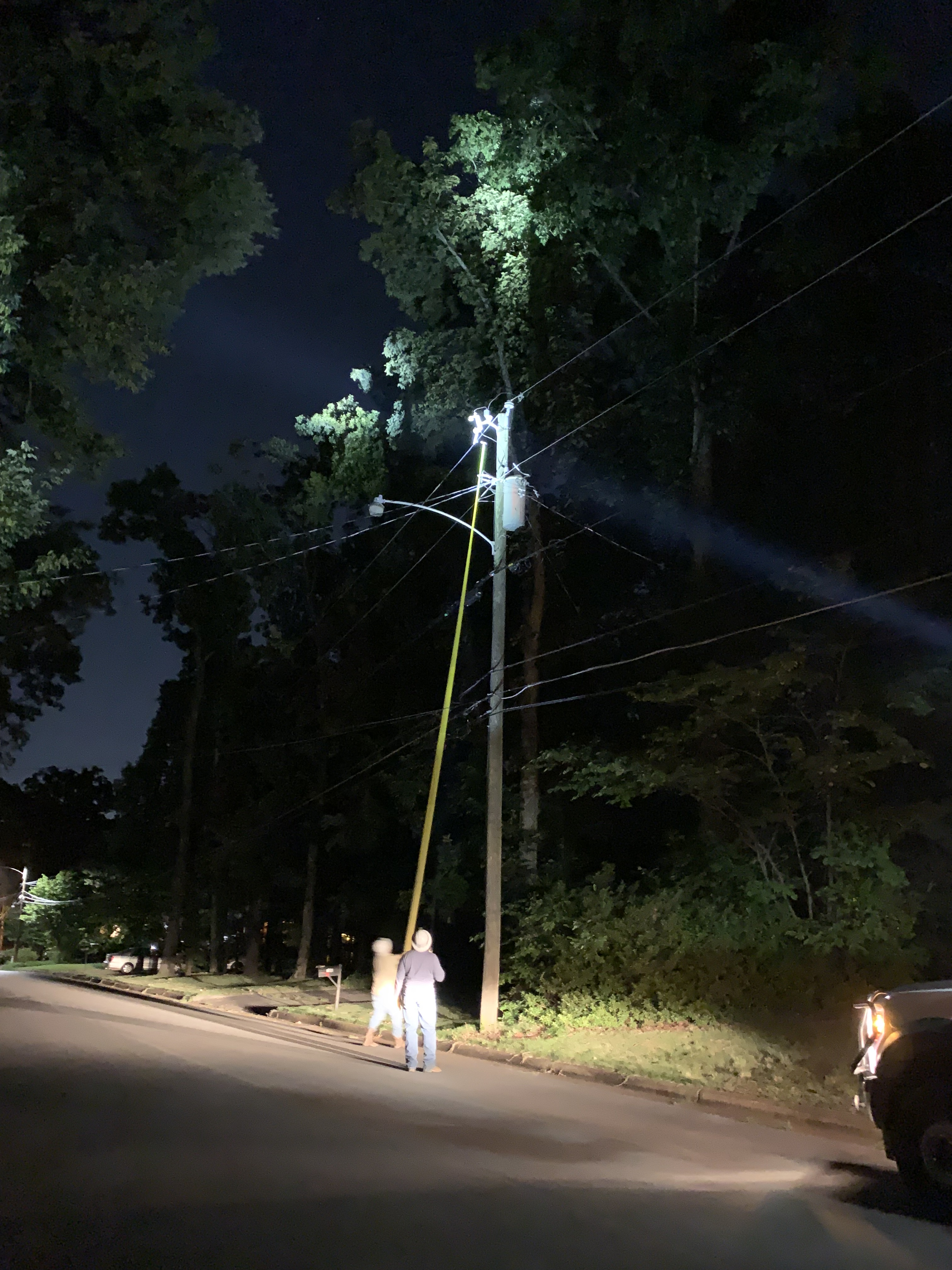
Linemen from Huntsville Utilities replace a blown cutout fuse with a non-conductive extending pole tool on July 10th, 2022 in Huntsville, Alabama.

The fuse holder typically has pull ring at the top that can be engaged by a hook at the end of a fiberglass hot stick operated by a lineworker standing on the ground or from a bucket truck, to manually open the switch. While often used for switching, the standard cutout shown is not designed to be manually opened under load. For applications where the switch is likely to be used to interrupt power manually, a "load break" version is available that has an attachment to quench the arc.

== Standards ==
Up until the mid-1990s each manufacturer used their own dimensional standards for cutout design; by the late 1990s most cutouts were of an "interchangeable design". This design allows for the interchangeable use of cutout bodies and fuse holders manufactured by different vendors.
