= 241 (disambiguation) =

241 may refer to:

- 241 (number), the number
- 241, the year CE
- 241 BC, the year BCE
- +241, the country calling code for telephone numbers in Gabon
- 241 Germania, a main-belt asteroid
- 241, a song by Filipino band Rivermaya from the album Between the Stars and Waves
- 241, a song by American band Reel Big Fish from the album Turn the Radio Off
- Fiat 241, a van
- ARO 241, an off-road vehicle

== See also ==
- List of highways numbered 241
- Flight 241 (disambiguation)
- Two for one (disambiguation)
