= TT-30 =

TT-30 may refer to:

- TT pistol, a Soviet semi-automatic pistol
- NEMA TT-30, a type of mains electricity connector
