= Stage pin connector =

Theatrical lighting connection type

A newer stage pin connector. Note the GR denoting the longer ground pin, which is slightly off-center to prevent the plug being inserted upside down.

A stage pin connector, also known as a grounded stage pin (GSP), grounded pin connector (GPC) or theater paddle (TP), is a standard cable type for theatrical lighting in North America and in many countries in the theatre world.

== Uses ==
Stage pin connectors are generally used for conducting dimmed power from a dimmer to stage lighting instruments, although occasionally they can power other equipment.

== Construction ==
The first stage pin connectors had two cylindrical pins, one for line (hot) and one for neutral, arranged symmetrically in a rectangular housing. The housing was milled from a solid block of fiberglass or bakelite which may have been impregnated with asbestos for fire resistance, with a screw-on cover. Later connectors (including those currently manufactured) use molded plastic or machined phenolic resin laminate housings .

These two-pin connectors were not polarized, and thus the line and neutral conductors could be exchanged depending on which way the connectors were mated. Two-pin connectors may still be found on some equipment and are often saved by electricians for wiring ungrounded fixtures (particularly practicals), though this may not be advisable from a safety standpoint.

Modern stage pin connectors have incorporated a third pin for a safety ground connection and are commonly referred to as two pin and ground (2P&G) to distinguish them from their ungrounded two-pin predecessors. The ground pin is situated between the line and neutral pins and closer to the latter for 20 A connectors. This asymmetrical configuration effectively polarizes the connector ensuring that the line and neutral conductors are not exchanged in a properly wired installation. The ground pin is also longer than the other two, ensuring that the safety ground connection is made first when making a connection.

All stage pin connectors have longitudinal slits in the male pins that allow for compression when inserted into the female sockets to increase friction and therefore the mechanical security of the connection. A special tool appropriately called a pin splitter may be used to expand this slit and spread the two halves of the pin to compensate for wear. A knife may be used to the same effect, but this technique risks both personal injury, damage to the connector, or ruining of the knife blade. For these reasons, a flat-head screwdriver is often used as an impromptu pin splitter.

For some time Union Connector produced 2P&G connectors with a distinctive yellow cover that featured a locking tab in the ground pin that provided a positive mechanical lock to prevent accidental disengagement of the connectors. This design required special connectors on both the male and female side in order to work, meaning that all connectors in an installation would need to be replaced to see a real benefit to the locking feature. The expense of this proposition as well as the unpopularity of the connector itself among technicians led the locking feature to eventually be dropped, and locking connectors are no longer manufactured. The locking connectors that are still found occasionally in installations or spare parts bins are often referred to as "Union Connectors", though the Union Connector brand now features only standard non-locking stage pin connectors.

Since their introduction, stage pin connectors have been available in 20 A, 30 A, 60 A, and 100 A varieties, with the higher-current connectors being not only far larger in size but also with a different pin configuration for ground, neutral and line. Care must be taken when repairing or building these larger connectors, because ground is on the outside pin and neutral is in the middle, with the far pin still being the line.

== Cabling ==
=== Extension cables ===
Most extension cables made with 20 A stage pin connectors use 12/3 type SOOW or SJOOW cable which has three individually insulated 12 awg (American Wire Gauge) stranded conductors inside a larger jacket. The internal insulation is usually colored black (for line), white (for neutral) and green(for ground). This cable configuration can safely handle the full 20 ampere rating of the connector. The designation SOOW or SJOOW refers to the cable's insulation construction and type. SJ— (300 volts, maximum) and S— (600 volts, maximum) are both "most severe" service cordage. This type of cable is very hard-wearing, resistant to oil and moisture, and resists the kinking that can result in internal conductors unlaying and twisting, which is a common problem with the SJTW cable often used in household-grade extension cords. However, older cable made using natural rubber is susceptible to dry-rotting, particularly with the heat generated by lighting equipment. This can cause the insulation to fail and expose or short circuit the conductors leading to shock or fire hazard if old cable is not inspected regularly and replaced as needed.

=== Multicircuit cable ===
Some stage pin extension cables may be constructed from cable with six or more conductors. This cable can be fitted with multiple stage-pin connectors at either end enabling the single cable to carry multiple independent output channels of dimmed power. Each channel or circuit should have its own line, ground, and neutral conductor independent of the other circuits, though in some cases the ground or neutral lines may be shared among circuits.

Alternatively, multicircuit cables may terminate in multicircuit (socapex) connectors which may in turn be mated to panel-mount multicircuit connectors on dimming equipment or distribution boxes, other multicircuit cables (to increase length), or break-in/break-out adapters to convert the multicircuit connection to a set of stage pin connections.

=== Equipment cabling ===
The cables integrally connected to lighting instruments (often referred to as pigtails) may use 3-conductor SJOOW or SOOW cable or individual high-temperature wires inside of a fiberglass sleeve. In either case, the cable is often smaller gauge and sized to the current rating of the equipment it services.

=== Adapters ===
Twofers are used to connect two devices to a single source. They may be constructed using individual wires inside of a fiberglass sleeve or 12/3 cable, though the latter type tends to be harder to construct and more prone to failure.

In some situations it may be desirable to connect an Edison-equipped device to a stage-pin source, such as when using a household fixture as an on-stage practical. Or it may be desirable to connect a stage pin-equipped device to an Edison source, for testing purposes or applications such as using theatrical equipment for architectural or retail displays. In either case, adapters may be constructed with a female Edison connector and a male stage pin connector or vice versa.

Some facilities feature 60 or 100 ampere circuits which have larger versions of the stage pin connector to match the higher current rating. Since it is unusual to require more than 20 amperes on a single circuit with modern lighting equipment, adapters may be made to convert a single 60 or 100 ampere stage pin connection to three to five 20 ampere stage pin connections. However, each downstream connection must be independently protected by a fuse or breaker to avoid exceeding the current rating of downstream cables and connectors.

== Stage pin versus NEMA 5-15 (Edison) connectors ==
The primary advantage of the stage pin connector over the NEMA 5-15 connector (commonly known as an Edison plug) is its ability to lie flat on a stage lessening the likelihood of being a trip hazard. In addition the stage pin connector has an increased durability and resistance to damage due to its more robust construction and the ability to compensate for wear with a pin splitter. Having a distinct connector designated for dimmable power also helps prevent confusion of dimmed and non-dimmed circuits which could lead to equipment damage. Even the smallest stage pin connectors are rated for 20 A, which translates to 2.4 kW at 120 V, compared to the 15 A and 1.8 kW of the NEMA 5-15.

Despite the advantages of stage pin connectors, many smaller installations use Edison connectors due to their availability and the ease of connecting equipment to outlets already available in a building. This reduces refit costs, particularly when small portable dimming packs (often 4×1.2 kW channel models) are used. Such installations may also use inexpensive store-bought extension cables, though care must be taken to ensure that the ratings of such extension cables are not exceeded.

Though the initial cost of constructing a 12/3 stage pin extension cable is higher than simply purchasing an equivalent Edison extension cable, the maintenance costs of the former are ultimately lower for several reasons. To begin with, less maintenance will be required as a result of the more rugged construction. When maintenance is required, many cable faults may be repaired by disassembling the connector, replacing broken components with spares acquired by cannibalizing other broken connectors, trimming away defective sections of cable, and reapplying the connector to the cable. This sort of repair is not usually possible with Edison connectors, particularly the factory-molded type. If a connector is beyond repair, a new stage pin connector is often less expensive than a replacement Edison connector when purchased from local vendors.

== Safety ==
Though stage pin connectors are usually used in part to distinguish dimmed circuits from non-dimmed Edison circuits, newer theatrical installations may have several dimmed circuits that terminate in Edison outlets at various locations for convenience; thus care must be taken to avoid using these circuits for non-dimmable equipment. Connecting certain non-dimmable appliances or equipment to dimmed circuits may result in damage to the dimming equipment or the downstream device.

Most modern stage pin connectors feature a ground pin that is longer than the line and neutral pins, ensuring that the ground connection is made first, and thus the safety ground is in place before line voltage is applied to the downstream equipment.

As an added precaution, some SPCs are built with a clear housing on one side. This allows a user to confirm that they are wired correctly before connecting them.

On some older female pin receptacles, the electrical contacts are not deeply recessed in the plug body and can easily be accidentally contacted resulting in an electric shock if the circuit is live. This was one advantage of the Edison outlet in that it was impossible to contact live parts unless something conductive was inserted into the slots. New connectors have the contacts deeper inside the body.

A major disadvantage to this style of connector is that it can be mated with one connector reversed, reversing ground and line connections. For equipment mechanically attached to grounded building structures such as a lighting instrument mounted to a batten or grid this will cause a line-ground short circuit. For equipment not attached to a building ground, such as a floor-mounted lighting instrument, this condition will cause the chassis of the equipment to become electrified creating a shock hazard. Care must therefore be taken to avoid misaligning plugs. It is also possible to mate stage pin connectors such that the ground pin is inserted into the neutral socket and the neutral pin is inserted into the ground socket, but this mistake does not usually result in a fault condition unless there is a hot-neutral reverse upstream in the cabling.

== Standards ==
Stage pin connectors are specified by Entertainment Services and Technology Association (ESTA) standard"ANSI E1.24 – 2012 (R2017) Entertainment Technology Dimensional Requirements for Stage Pin Connectors"

== Other connectors used in theatre applications ==
Many theatres also use NEMA connectors, which are the standard connector used in homes and businesses in North America, because of their availability and the ability to connect household fixtures to a theatrical control system. Twist-lock connectors are used in many theatres because of their locking feature, which will not allow fixtures to become accidentally disconnected. Connectors used to power lighting fixtures must be rated at 20 amperes or higher, depending on local electrical codes. Temporary high-power distribution wiring often employs camlock connectors to connect dimming equipment, power distribution units, controllers for motorized chain hoists, and other high-power equipment to a company switch, generator, or other tie-in point.

For individual dimmable lighting fixtures, UK theatrical lighting installations normally use the BS 546 type plug rated at 15 A (the higher phase voltage of 230 V allows lower currents for the same power) or occasionally IEC 60309 16 A industrial plugs.

== See also ==
- Twist-lock connector
- Camlock
- Electrician
- Stage lighting
- Multicable
