= Socapex =

Brand of electrical connector

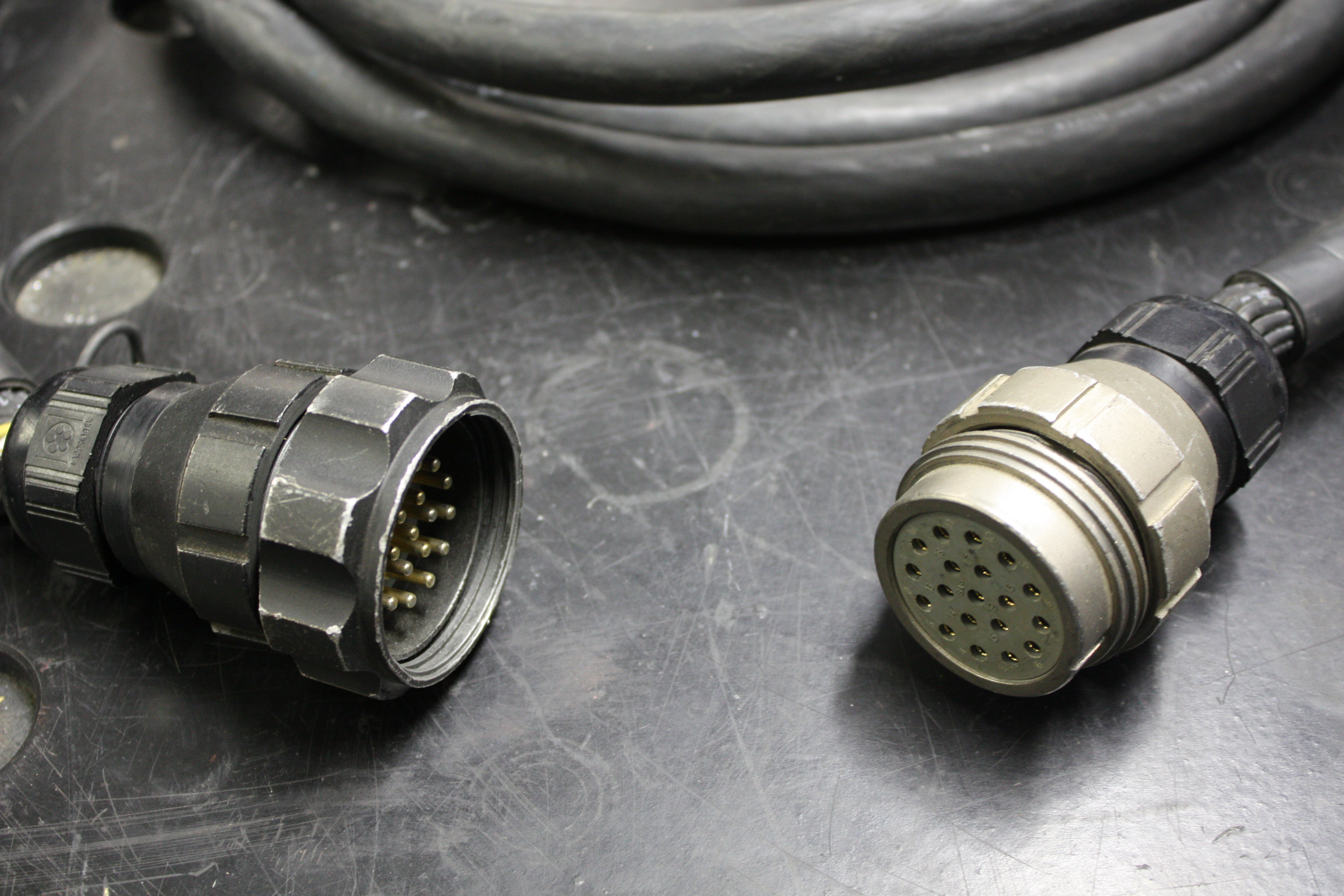
19-pin Socapex connector

Socapex is a brand of electrical connectors, known in the entertainment industry primarily for their 19-pin electrical connectors, commonly known as Socapex connectors, and used in film, television, and stage lighting to terminate the ends of a multicable. They are wired with six hot/live pins, six neutral pins, six ground/earth pins, and a final central pin used to aid alignment of the prong end of the connector with a socket receptacle. The Socapex was first created by a company called Socapex in 1961, which later on became Amphenol Socapex. "Socapex" became a brand name owned by Amphenol Socapex, the term "Soca" is now often applied to similar off-brand connectors as a genericized trademark.

"Breakouts" are often used to connect fixtures to the cable. The breakout consists of a male Socapex connector with six "tails" with female connectors such as parallel blade receptacle, stage pin connector, IEC 60309 16 A, NEMA L5-20P & L6-20P 'twist-lock', BS 546 15 A, PowerCon or Schuko connectors, according to the standards of the region in which the assembly is being used. A "breakin" is the opposite, consisting of "tails" with male connectors such as Parallel Blade, stage pin connectors, IEC 60309 16 A, NEMA L5-20R & L6-20P 'twist-lock', BS 546 or Schuko connectors feeding a female Socapex connector. These are used to connect Socapex cables to single or multiple power sources which do not have direct Socapex outputs.

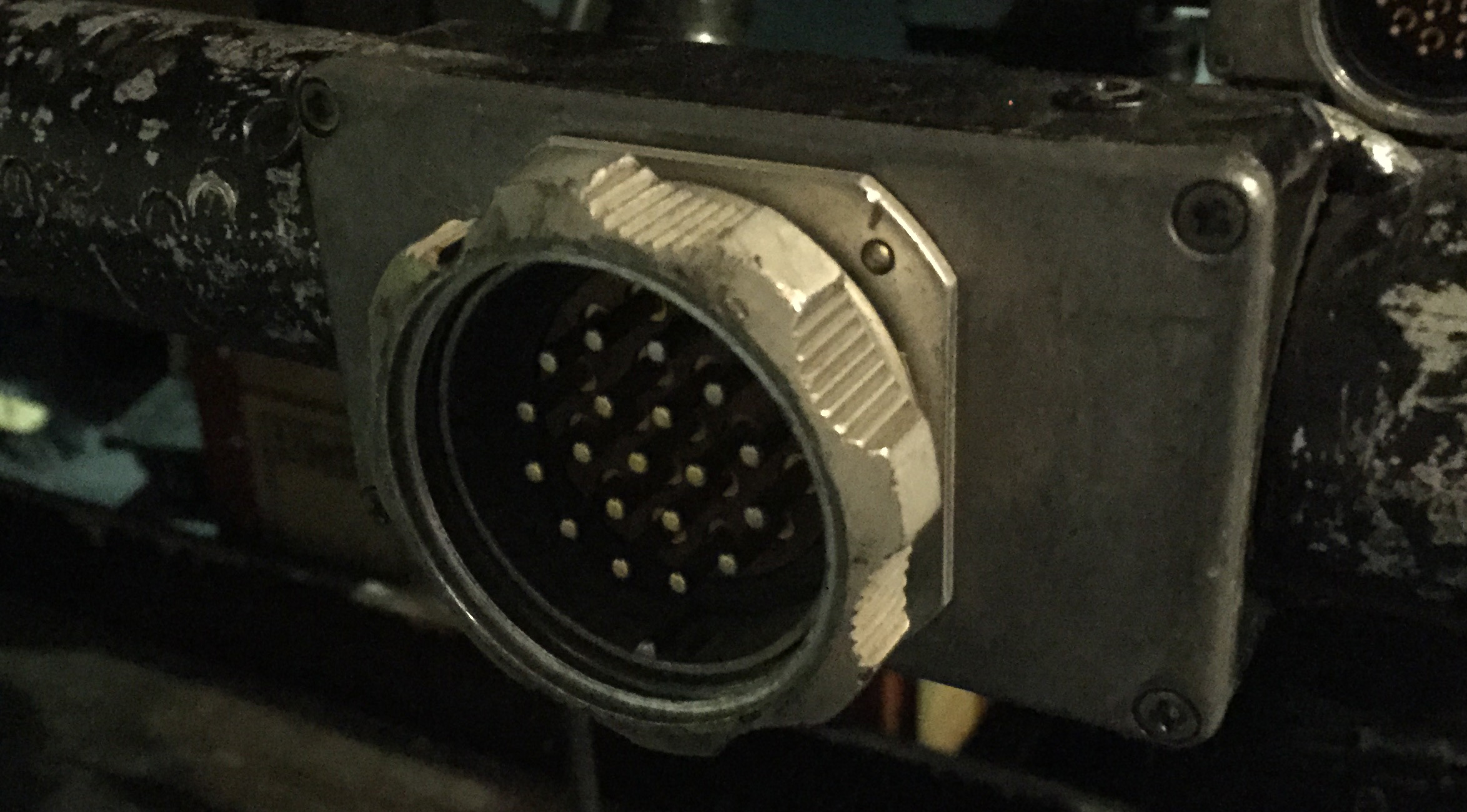
Male panel-mount 19-pin connector

Some fixtures and assemblies containing several lamps, such as PARbars, may use a panel mounted Socapex connector to avoid the need for a separate breakout, and many such fixtures also incorporate a female Socapex connector to allow further similar fixtures to be chained from the same supply.

Amphenol Socapex is still manufacturing and selling the original Socapex. These connectors are keyed to prevent insertion into a circuit with the wrong voltage, or to prevent insertion of audio cables on power circuits.
