= Two for one =

Two for one or 2 for 1 may refer to:

- Hendiadys, or "two for one", a figure of speech
- "Buy one, get one free", or "two for one", a type of sales promotion
- All at Once (2016 film) (working title Two for One), an American drama film
- Two 4 One, a 2014 Canadian comedy-drama film
- "Two for One" (Roseanne), a 1994 television episode
- Two for One: Wide Eyed/Brave, a 2008 double album by Nichole Nordeman
- "Two for one", in collectible card game strategy, a card advantage

== See also ==
- Twofer, a cabling device used in theatrical stage lighting
