= Electrical Safety Foundation =

Electrical Safety Foundation International (ESFI)
- Abbreviation: ESFI
- Founded: 1994
- Founders: National Electrical Manufacturers Association; Underwriters Laboratories; US Consumer Product Safety Commission
- Type: Foundation (United States law) (IRS exemption status): 501(c)(3)
- Purpose: Electrical Safety, Education
- Location: Rosslyn, Arlington, Virginia, United States
- Website: ESFI.org

The Electrical Safety Foundation International (ESFI) is a 501(c)(3) non-profit organization based in Rosslyn, Virginia, US dedicated exclusively to promoting electrical safety at home, school, and in the workplace. Founded in 1994 as a cooperative effort by the National Electrical Manufacturers Association (NEMA), Underwriters Laboratories (UL), and the US Consumer Product Safety Commission (CPSC), ESFI is funded by charitable contributions from, distributors, Nationally Recognized Testing Laboratories, retailers, insurers, utilities, safety organizations, and trade and labor associations. The mission of ESFI is to prevent electrically related injuries, deaths, and fires through public education and outreach.

== National Electrical Safety Month ==
Each May, ESFI commemorates National Electrical Safety Month (NESM) to raise awareness for and educate the public on critical electrical safety topics. In many states, governors have issued proclamations to observe National Electrical Safety Month. NESM also garnered Presidential recognition in 2014.

== Programs ==
ESFI supports and creates materials to raise awareness on the following consumer hazards and electrical safety technologies required by the National Fire Protection Association's National Electrical Code:

- Ground Fault Circuit Interrupters
- Arc Fault Circuit Interrupters
- Tamper Resistant Receptacles
- Surge Protective Devices
- Electric Shock Drowning
- Counterfeit Electrical Goods
- Fire Prevention

== Board Members (2025) ==
=== Executive Committee ===
- Chair Alan Manche, Schneider Electric
- Immediate Past Chair Lorraine Carli, National Fire Protection Association
- Vice Chair Nelson Squires, WESCO Distribution
- Treasurer Michael Pfeiffer, National Electrical Manufacturers Association
- Secretary Milan Dotlich, UL (Underwriters Laboratories)
- Ex-Officio Member Debra Phillips, National Electrical Manufacturers Association

=== Directors ===
- Pung Chan, Legrand North America
- Steve Jackson, nVent
- Thayer Long, Independent Electrical Contractors
- Jacob Middleton, Siemens
- Tobias Sellier, American Public Power Association
- Igor Stamenkovic, Eaton Corporation
- Mike Starner, National Electrical Contractors Association
- Stephanie Voyda, Edison Electric Institute
- Richard Weiser, CSA Group

=== Board Liaison ===
- Andrew Trotta, US Consumer Product Safety Commission
