= Flight 241 =

Flight 241 may refer to:

- Aerosvit Flight 241, crashed on 17 December 1997
- PMTair Flight 241, crashed on 25 June 2007
- CHC Helikopter Service Flight 241, crashed on 29 April 2016
- Air Vanuatu Flight 241, suffered an in-flight engine fire on 28 July 2018
