= Twofer =

Cabling device used in theatrical stage lighting

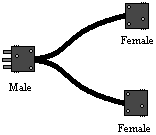
A stagepin twofer

A twofer is a cabling device used in theatrical stage lighting. It allows two stage lighting instruments to be connected to one circuit. It is wired in parallel, such that voltage is unchanged in the twofer, and current is split and divided over two connectors. Twofers are used in conjunction with cables with the same types of connectors. The name is a corruption of the phrase "Two For One".

== UK terminology ==
The UK equivalent of the twofer is a Grelco. The name derives from the manufacturer of the original examples, but is now generally adopted for all examples regardless of manufacturer. It typically relates to a splitter for the UK 15 A power connections commonly used for stage lighting. It is usually an integral block rather than a plug with two cables leading to two sockets. Where a single plug goes to three or more sockets it is sometimes known as a Trelco.

Typically for most other power connector types used in theatre, the term (2-way) splitter is used.

== Australian terminology ==
For several decades, much rock-and-roll and other lighting used "Par Cans", each containing a 120-volt PAR 64 lamp. As the mains supply is 240 volts these must be connected in series, via an adapter lead or box featuring two sockets.
