= NEMA connector =

Power plugs and receptacles used in North America and some other regions

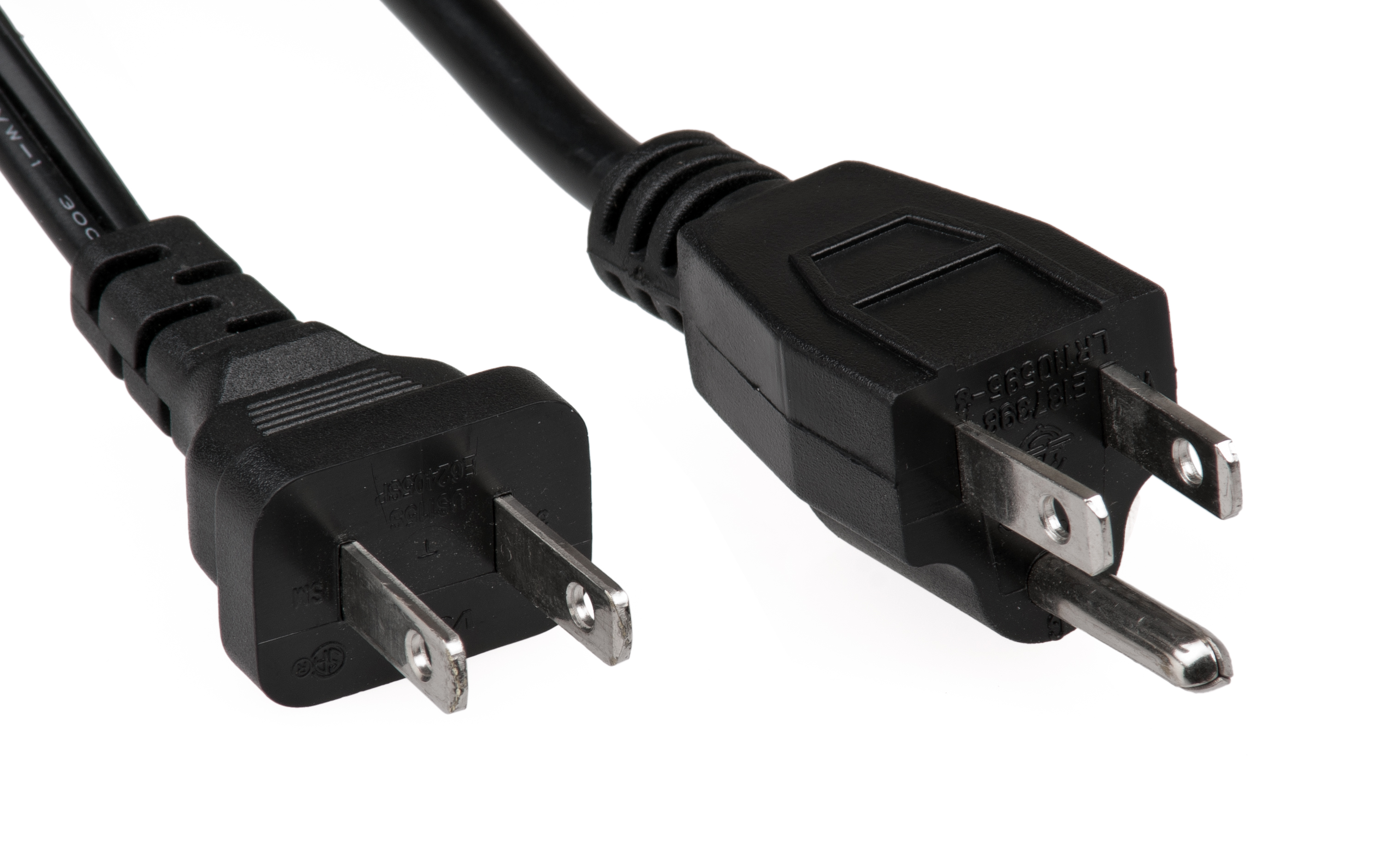
Ungrounded (NEMA 1-15, left) and grounded (NEMA 5-15, right) power plugs

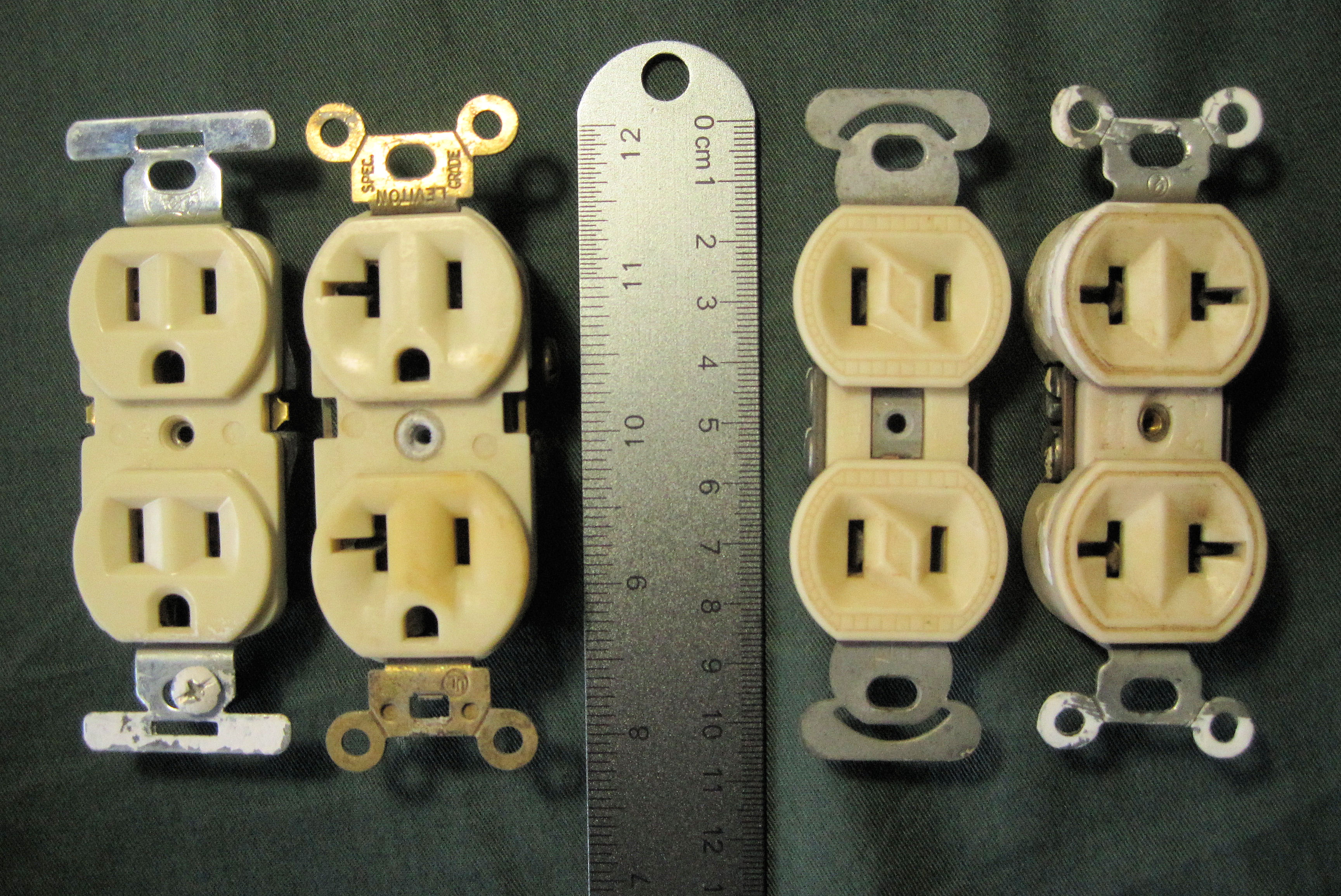
Common North American 125-volt receptacles. All accept a 1-15P plug. The two on the left are Eagle and Leviton, also accepting grounded 5-15P plugs. The second from the left also accepts 5-20P plugs. The NEMA 5-15R device on the far left is most common. The two rightmost designs are typically seen in older buildings.

NEMA connectors are power plugs and sockets used for AC mains electricity in North America, Central America, Japan, Taiwan and other countries that use the standards set by the US National Electrical Manufacturers Association. They are defined by the IEC as the Type A and Type B plugs. NEMA wiring devices are made in current ratings from 15 to 60 amperes (A), with voltage ratings from 125 to 600 volts (V).

Different combinations of contact blade widths, shapes, orientations, and dimensions create non-interchangeable connectors that are unique for each combination of voltage, electric current carrying capacity, and grounding system. NEMA 1-15P (two-pole, no ground) and NEMA 5-15P (two-pole with ground pin) plugs are used on common domestic electrical equipment, and NEMA 5-15R is the standard 15-ampere electric receptacle (outlet) found in the United States, and under relevant national standards, in Canada (CSA C22.2 No. 42), Mexico (NMX-J-163-ANCE), Japan (JIS C 8303), and Taiwan.

The dimensional standard for electrical connectors is ANSI/NEMA WD-6 and is available from the NEMA website. Other plug and receptacle types are for special purposes or for heavy-duty applications.

== Nomenclature ==
NEMA receptacles, with their common US uses listed (in purple text)

NEMA connectors are named following an alphanumeric code consisting of:

(optional L for locking) numerals – numerals (suffix R for receptacle or P for plug).

There are two basic classifications of NEMA connectors: straight-blade and locking. The metal conductive blades are often informally called prongs (as in 3-prong plug). Numbers prefixed by 'L' are curved-blade, twist-locking connectors. Twist-locking types are used for heavy industrial and commercial equipment, where increased protection against accidental disconnection is required.

The numerals preceding the hyphen encode the number of poles (current-carrying terminals) and wires connected to it, the voltage, and single- or three-phase power. A connector with ground terminal has more wires than poles: two-pole, three-wire; or four-pole, five-wire; etc. A non-grounded device may be two-pole, two-wire; three-pole, three-wire; etc.

The numerals following the hyphen is the current rating of the device in amperes. This number is followed by the letter 'R' to indicate a receptacle (socket) or 'P' to indicate a plug (prongs).

As an example, the 5-15R is the common 125 V two-pole, three-wire receptacle rated for 15 A. The L5-15R, while sharing the same electrical rating, is a locking design that is not physically compatible with the straight-blade 5-15 design. The 5-30R has the same two-pole, three-wire configuration and 125 V rating, but is rated for 30 A.

Although there are several non-grounding device types in the NEMA standards, only three of them are in widespread use today. These are the two-pole 1-15, still in use in millions of buildings built before the 1960s, and the three-pole 10-30 and 10-50.

Other types of NEMA connectors that do not follow this nomenclature include: the ML series (so-called "Midget Locking" connectors named for their diminutive size), TT (for connecting travel trailers and other recreational vehicles to external power sources), SS series ("ship-to-shore" connectors for connecting boats to shore power) and the FSL series (used in military and aircraft applications).

The small hole near the end of the power (non-ground) blades of some NEMA plugs is used for convenience in manufacturing; if present, it must be of specified diameter and position. Small specialized padlocks are available to fit these holes, allowing "lockout" of hazardous equipment, by physically preventing insertion of locked plugs into a power receptacle. Since at least 1949, numerous receptacle devices have also been invented to use these holes to hold the prongs inside the receptacle slots, using a corresponding latch or locking mechanism.

The blades of a NEMA connector are identified within the dimensional standard as follows: 'G' identifies the grounding conductor, 'W' identifies the (grounded) neutral conductor, and 'X', 'Y', and 'Z' are the "hot" line conductors. Single-phase connectors have only a single terminal identified as 'X' or two terminals, 'X' and 'Y'. Three-phase connectors will use 'X', 'Y' and 'Z'.

Criticism has been aimed at the design leaving a gap with exposed prongs. This safety flaw has been exploited by a January 2020 Internet phenomenon known as the Penny Outlet Challenge, where conductive materials, usually coins or paper clips were dropped into the gap, causing electric sparks, which once led to a building evacuation in Westford Academy.

NEMA receptacle chart (non-twist lock)
V	N E M A	15 A (12)		20 A (16)		30 A (24) [8 AWG]		50 A (40) [8/6 AWG]		60 A (48) [6 AWG]		70 A (56) [6/4 AWG]		90 A (72) [4 AWG]	
V	N E M A	Receptacle	Plug	Receptacle	Plug	Receptacle	Plug	Receptacle	Plug	Receptacle	Plug	Receptacle	Plug	Receptacle	Plug
125 V	1	1-15R	1-15P	5-20R	1-20P	5-30R	1-30P	-		-		-		-	
250 V	2	6-15R	2-15P	2-20R	2-20P	2-30R	2-30P	-		-		-		-	
150 V	3	144-2-12S	144-2-12P	144-2-16S	144-2-16P	-		-		-		-		-	
125 V	5	5-15R	5-15P	5-20R	5-20P	5-30R	5-30P	5-50R	5-50P	-		-		-	
250 V	6	6-15R	6-15P	6-20R	6-20P	6-30R	6-30P	6-50R	6-50P	-		-		-	
277 V	7	7-15R	7-15P	7-20R	7-20P	7-30R	7-30P	7-50R	7-50P	-		-		-	
150 V	8	-		-		144-3-24S	144-3-24P	144-3-40S	144-3-40P	-		-		-	
125 / 250 V	10	-		10-20R	10-20P	10-30R	10-30P	10-50R	10-50P	-		-		-	
3Φ 250 V	11	11-15R	11-15P	11-20R	11-20P	11-30R	11-30P	11-50R	11-50P	-		-		-	
150 / 300 V	12	-		-		-		-		-		288-4-56S	288-4-56P	288-4-72S	288-4-72P
125 / 250 V	14	14-15R	14-15P	14-20R	14-20P	14-30R	14-30P	14-50R	14-50P	14-60R	14-60P	-		-	
3Φ 250 V	15	15-15R	15-15P	15-20R	15-20P	15-30R	15-30P	15-50R	15-50P	15-60R	15-60P	-		-	
3ΦY 120 / 208 V	18	18-15R	18-15P	18-20R	18-20P	18-30R	18-30P	18-50R	18-50P	18-60R	18-60P	-		-	

NEMA classes
Pole configuration	120/208/240 V service			277/480 V service			347/600 V service			240/415 V service		
Pole configuration	Voltage	Grounded		Voltage	Grounded		Voltage	Grounded		Voltage	Grounded	
Pole configuration	Voltage	no	yes	Voltage	no	yes	Voltage	no	yes	Voltage	no	yes
hot–neutral	120 V	1; ML1	5; TT SS1; ML2	277 V	3	7	347 V	-	24	240 V	-	25
hot–hot	240 V (split-phase); 208 V (wye)	2	6	480 V	-	8	600 V	4	9	415 V	-	-
hot–hot–neutral	120/240 V (split-phase); 120/208 V (wye)	10; ML3	14; SS2	277/480 V	-	-	347/600 V	-	-	240/415 V	-	-
hot–hot–hot	240 V (delta); 208 V (wye)	11	15	480 V	12	16	600 V	13	17	415 V	-	-
hot–hot–hot–neutral	120/208 V	18	21	277/480 V	19	22	347/600 V	20	23	240/415 V	-	26

== Non-locking connectors ==
NEMA non-locking connectors all use blades of various flat and folded shapes (except for the round pins used on grounding connectors). The plugs can be detached from the receptacles by pulling back on the plug body. These connector families have been designed so that connectors of differing types cannot be accidentally intermated.

NEMA wall receptacles can be found installed in any orientation. None of the relevant standards and codes—NEMA, the US National Electrical Code, the Canadian Electrical Code, and the National Electrical Contractors Association's installation standard (NEIS 130-2016)—specifies a preferred orientation. The latter only requires a consistent orientation for sockets installed together or nearby. In practice, most receptacles have their ground blade on the bottom; in this case, the neutral blade is on the upper left and the hot blade is on the upper right. All descriptions below assume this orientation (i.e., clockwise order is ground, neutral, hot for 120 V receptacle versions; and counter-clockwise for plug versions).

=== NEMA 1 ===
This two-prong design, with two flat parallel non-coplanar blades and slots, is used in most of North America and on the east coast of South America on lamps; consumer electronics such as clocks, radios, and battery chargers; and other double-insulated small appliances that do not require grounding (earthing).

All NEMA 1 devices are two-wire non-grounding devices (hot-neutral) rated for 125 V maximum. 1-15P plugs have two parallel flat blades, 1/4 inch (6.4 mm) wide, 0.06 inches (1.5 mm) thick, 5/8–23/32 inch (15.9–18.3 mm) long, and spaced 1/2 inch (12.7 mm) apart.

1-15R receptacles have been prohibited in new construction in the United States and Canada since 1962, but remain in many older buildings, and this obsolete design is still available for repair use only. Since January 1, 1974, all new power outlets are required to have a ground connection, using grounded receptacles (typically 5-15R or 5-20R) that accept both grounded and non-grounded plugs. Replacement of obsolete NEMA 1 receptacles requires either rewiring with an additional ground conductor for a NEMA 5 receptacle, or a NEMA 5 receptacle complete with a ground fault circuit interrupter for two-wire non-grounded configurations (when a ground conductor is not available).

Ungrounded NEMA 1 plugs are still popularly used by manufacturers of small appliances and electronic devices because of the design's low cost and compact size, and they are upward compatible with modern grounded NEMA 5 receptacles. Standards permit ungrounded plugs where the appliance does not require grounding due to low risk of leakage current, such as on double-insulated devices.

In older plug designs both blades were the same width, so the plug could be inserted into the receptacle either way around. Many plugs manufactured since 1948 are polarized; the neutral blade is 5/16 in (7.9 mm) wide, 1/16 in (1.6 mm) wider than the line blade, so the plug can be inserted only one way. Polarized 1-15P plugs will not fit into unpolarized receptacles, which have only narrow slots. Polarized 1-15P plugs will fit 5-15R grounded receptacles, which have the same wider slot for the neutral blade. Some devices that do not distinguish between neutral and line, such as internally isolated AC adapters, are still produced with unpolarized narrow blades. Cheater plug adapters allow a three-prong grounded 5-15P plug to be mated to a non-grounded 1-15R receptacle. The adapters include a spade lug to allow connecting to ground, often via the cover screw used to attach the outlet faceplate. These adapters are illegal in some jurisdictions, in particular throughout Canada.

There are some obsolete 1-15R or 1-20R (120 V, 15 or 20 A) receptacles which are mechanically able to accept 1-15P (120 V), 1-20P (120 V), 2-15P (240 V), or 2-20P (240 V) plugs. These receptacles are typically found in older residential buildings and are not allowed to be installed under current NEC codes. In addition to the lack of grounding, these obsolete receptacles could allow a connected device to overheat and create a fire hazard if a device designed for the wrong voltage is connected. These problematic outlets are easily identifiable due to their lack of ground, along with both openings on the receptacle face being a sideways T-shaped opening that appear to be mirrored on the vertical center line of the face. Due to the potential danger of a voltage mismatch, whenever possible these receptacles should be replaced. Depending on local code, replacement with a "repair" approved non-grounded receptacle may be sufficient.

The Japanese plug and socket with narrow insulating faces appear and work physically identical to NEMA 1-15, and such non-grounded receptacles are still common in Japan (though grounded 5-15R and 5-20R receptacles are slowly becoming more common). The Japanese system incorporates stricter dimensional requirements for the plug housing, different marking requirements, and mandatory testing and approval by METI or JIS.

NEMA standards exist for 1-15P, 1-20P and 1-30P plugs, and the 1-15R receptacle. There are no 1-20R and 1-30R receptacles, because 1-20P and 1-30P can mate with a corresponding NEMA 5 receptacle.

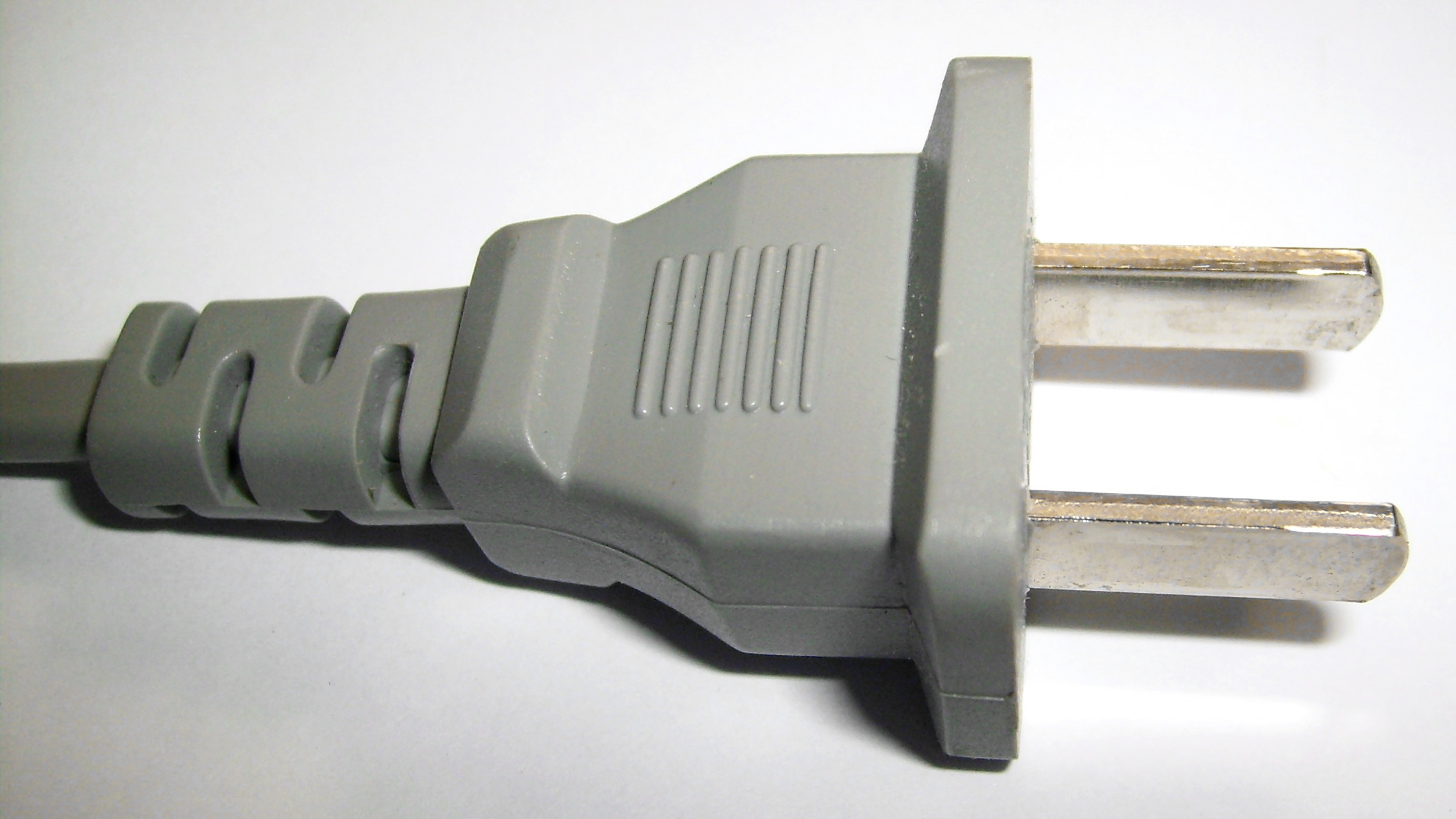
A non-polarized 1-15P plug has 2 identical blades.

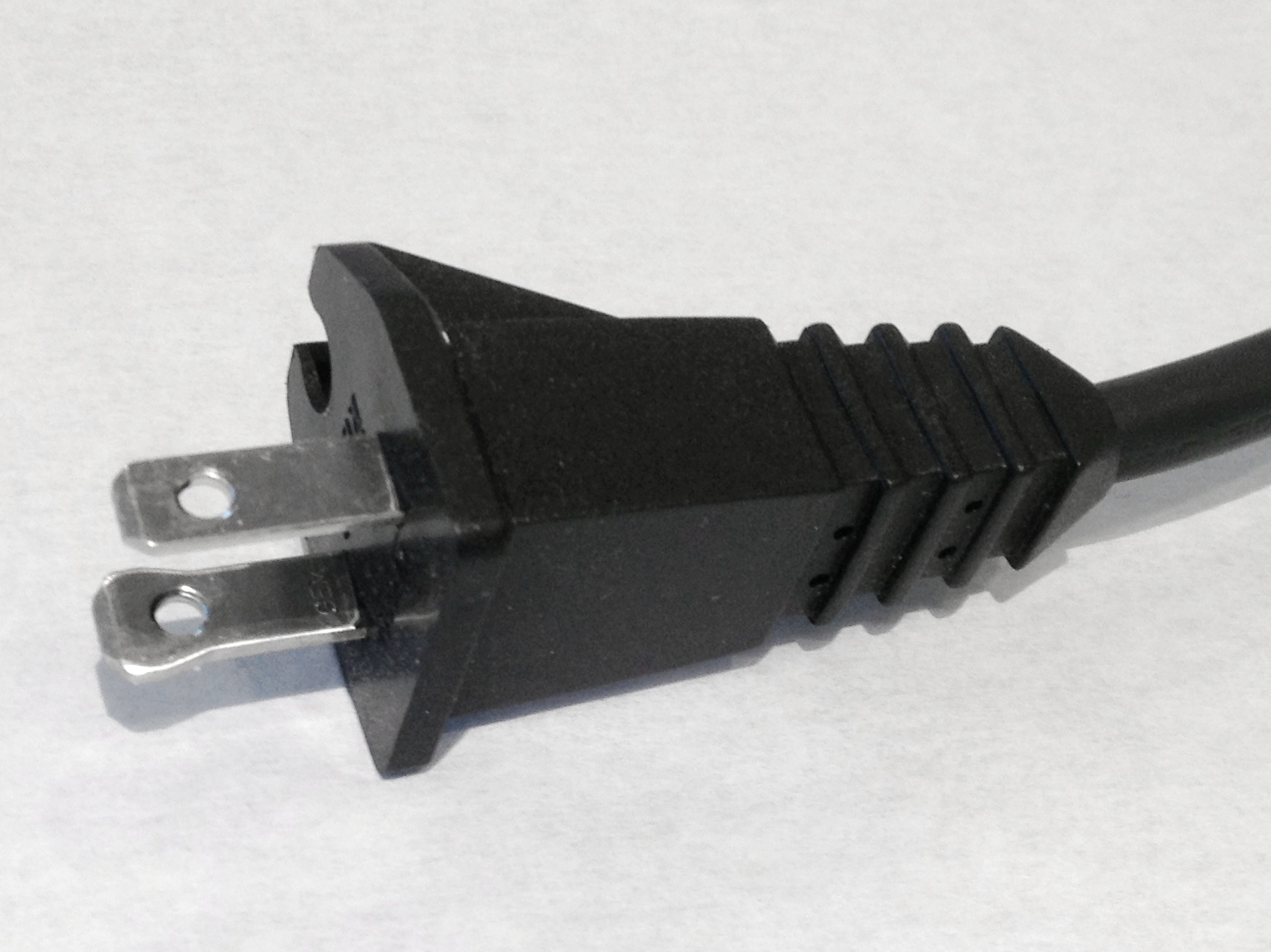
One blade is wider on a polarized 1-15P plug.

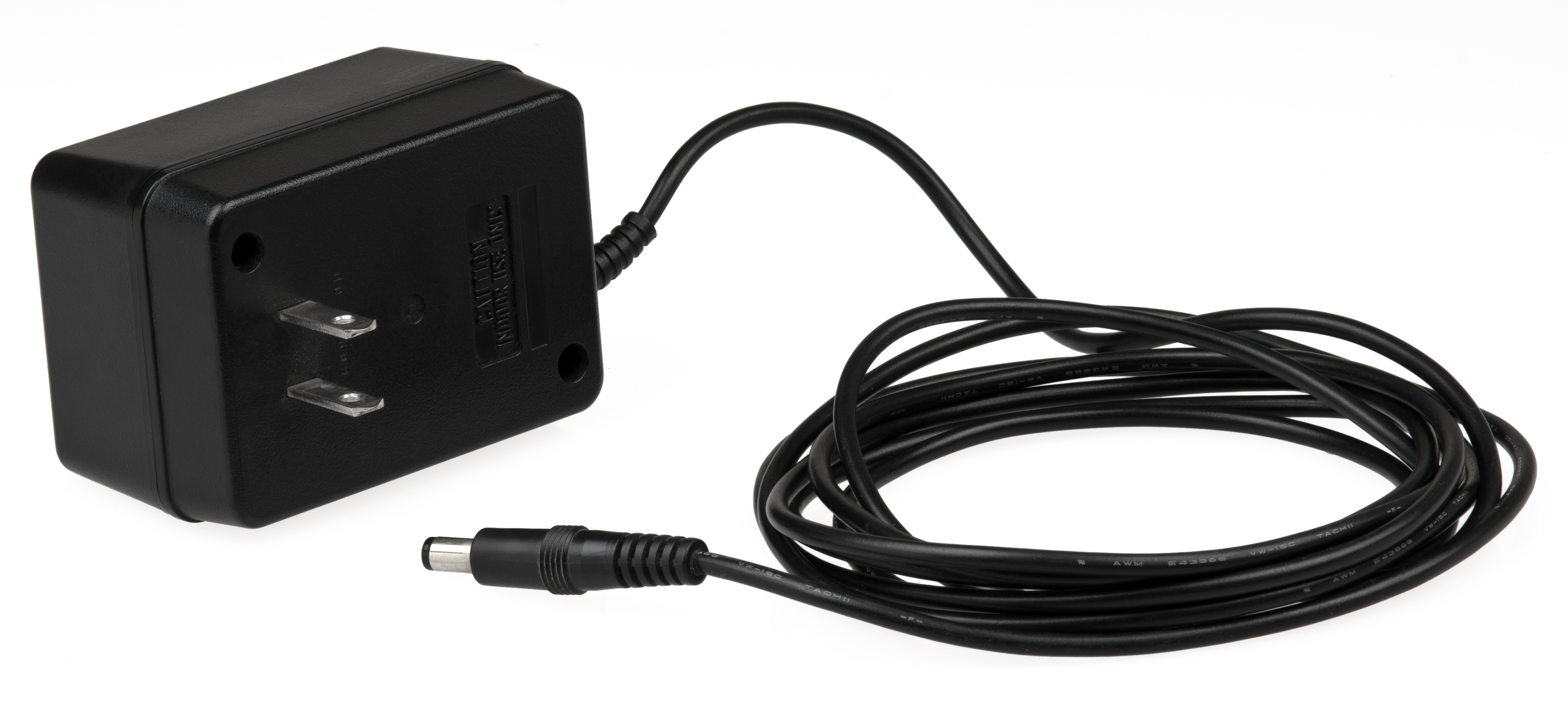
AC adapter with integrated plug pins matching an unpolarized NEMA 1-15P

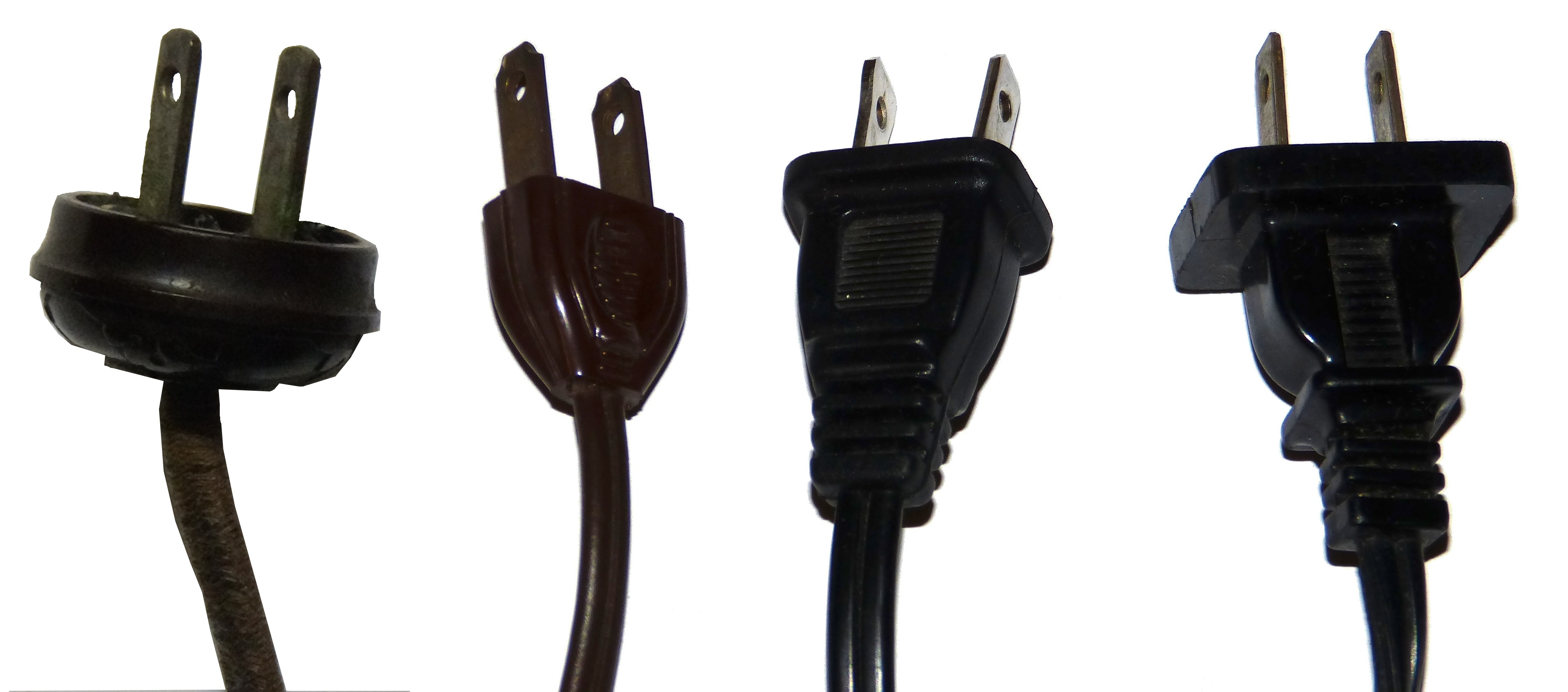
Newer NEMA 1-15 plugs with wider protective faces (middle right) have a safety advantage; plugs for electric toys (right) as well as very early plugs (left) have noticeably wide faces to discourage touching the electrical contacts.

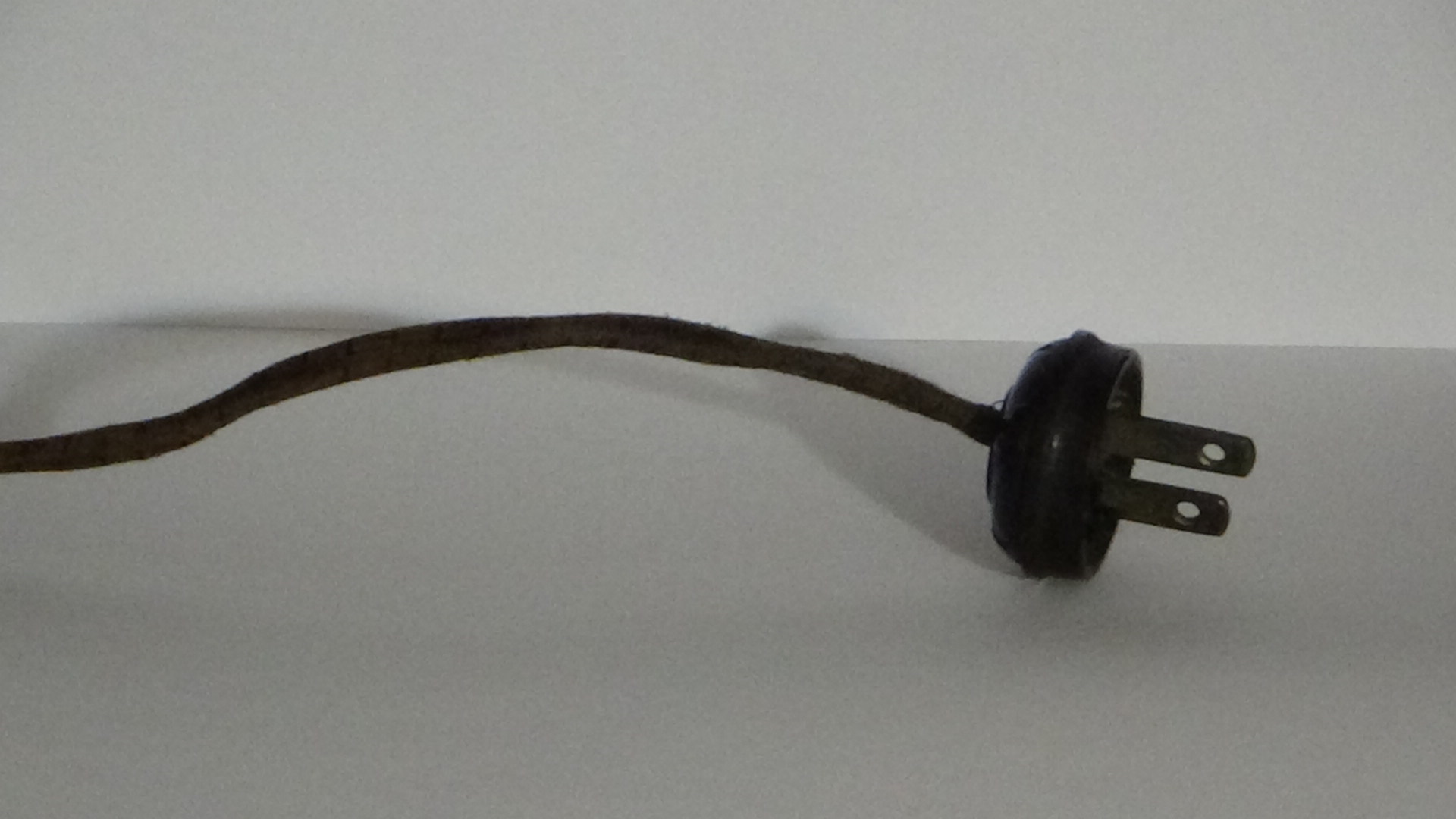
A NEMA 1 cord from 1932, with wide protective face to prevent touching the electrical contacts.

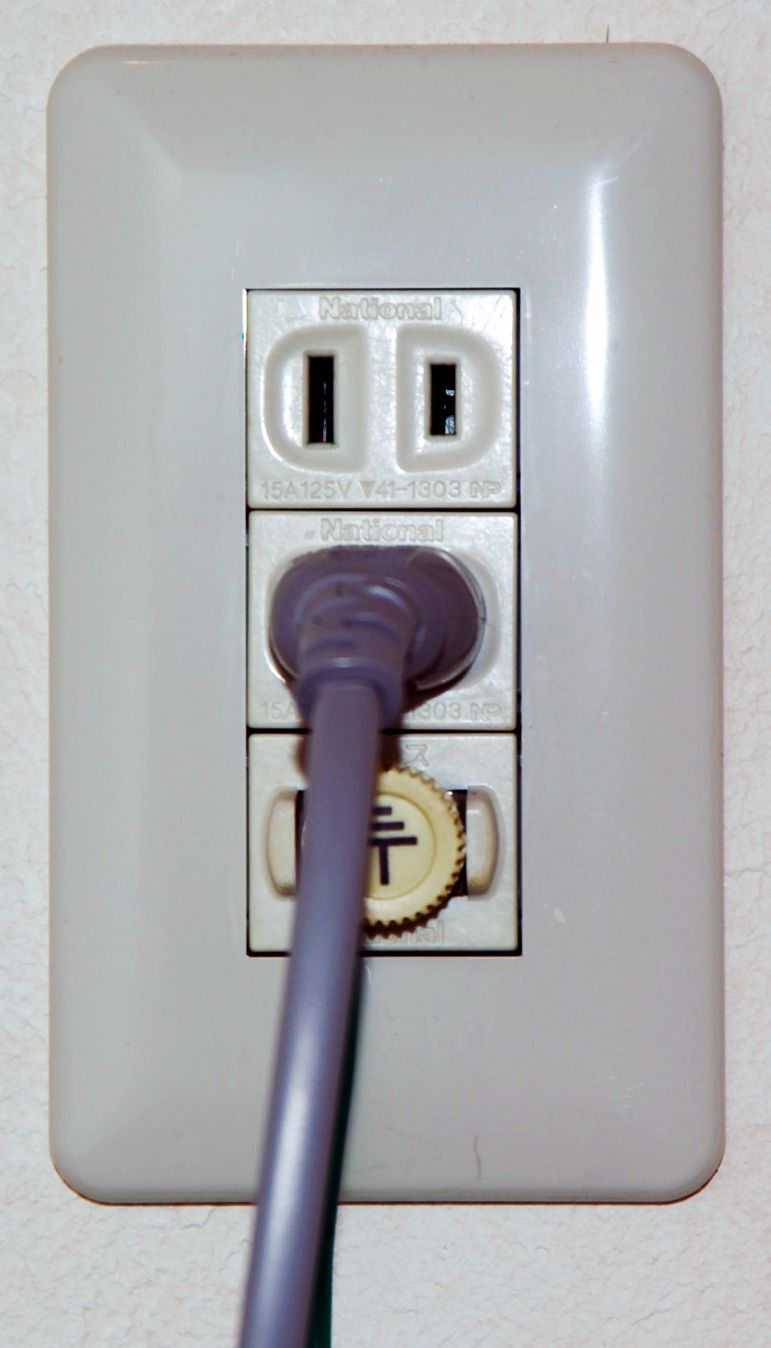
Japanese socket with grounding post, for a washing machine

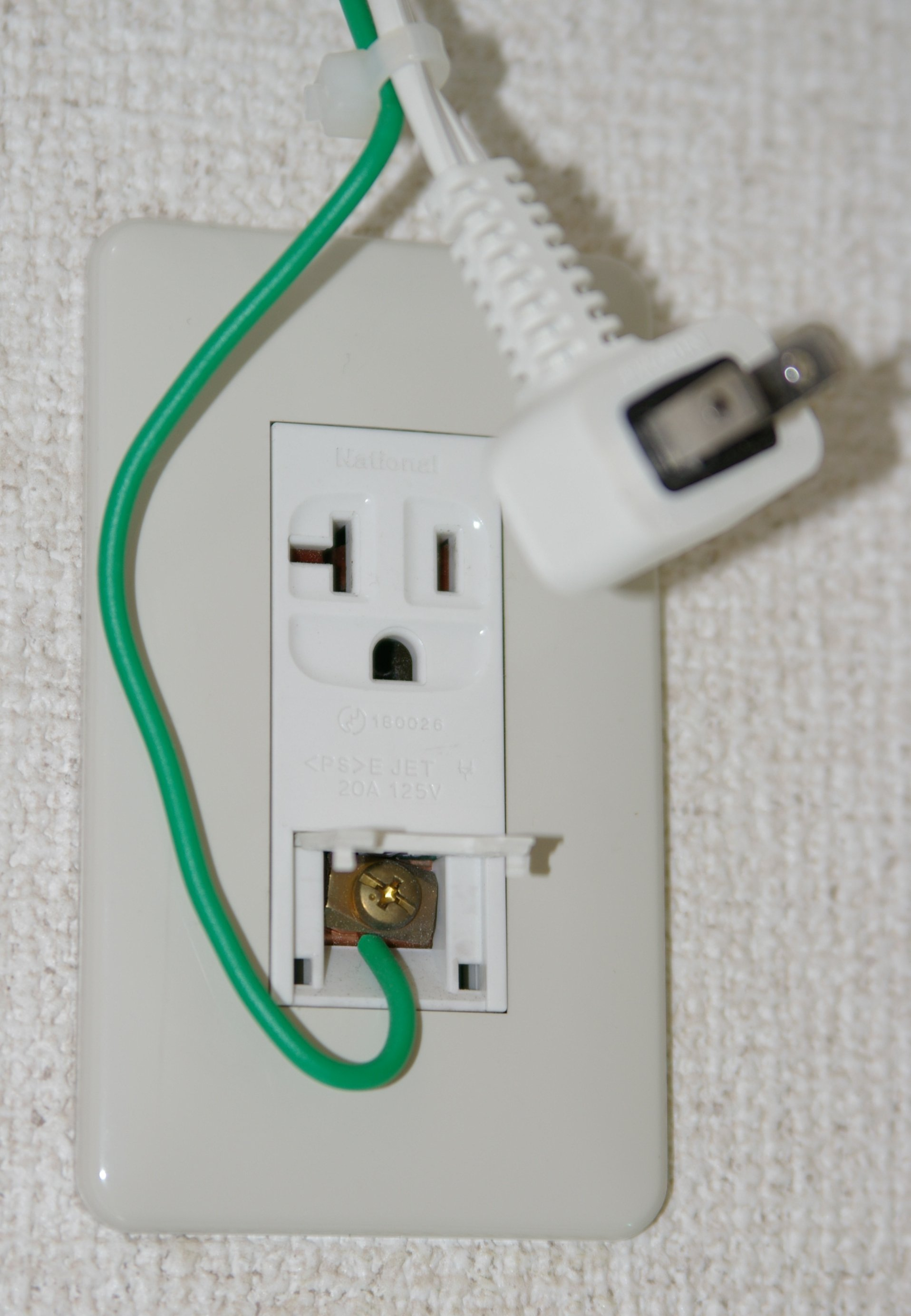
Japanese socket having the narrowest socket face with grounding post, for an air conditioner

=== NEMA 2 ===
All NEMA 2 devices are two-wire non-grounding devices (hot-hot) rated for 250 V maximum. Although standards exist for 2-15, 2-20 and 2-30, this series is obsolete, and only Hubbell still manufactures 2-20 devices (for repair purposes).

=== NEMA 3 ===
This series of devices is specified for 277-volt, two-wire, non-grounding devices. According to NEMA, this is "reserved for future configurations", so no designs for this series exist and no devices have been manufactured.

=== NEMA 4 ===
This series of devices is specified for 600-volt, two-wire, non-grounding devices. Identically to the NEMA 3 series, this is "reserved for future configurations" and no designs for this series exist and no devices have been manufactured.

=== NEMA 5 ===
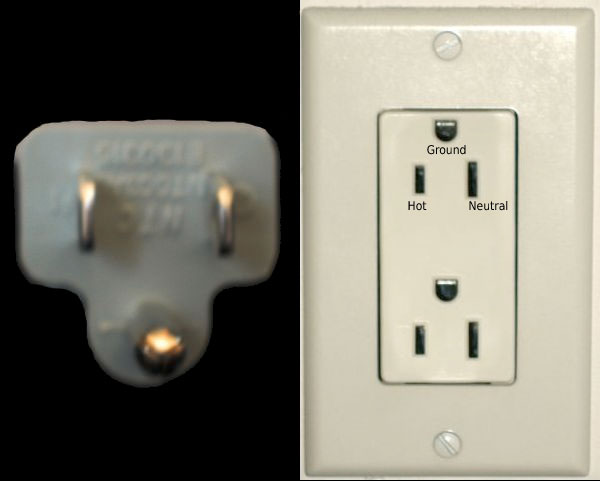
NEMA 5-15P plug and NEMA 5-15R receptacle (different scales, blade spacing is 0.5 inches (12.7 mm) for both). Each receptacle also accepts an ungrounded plug, whether polarized or unpolarized.

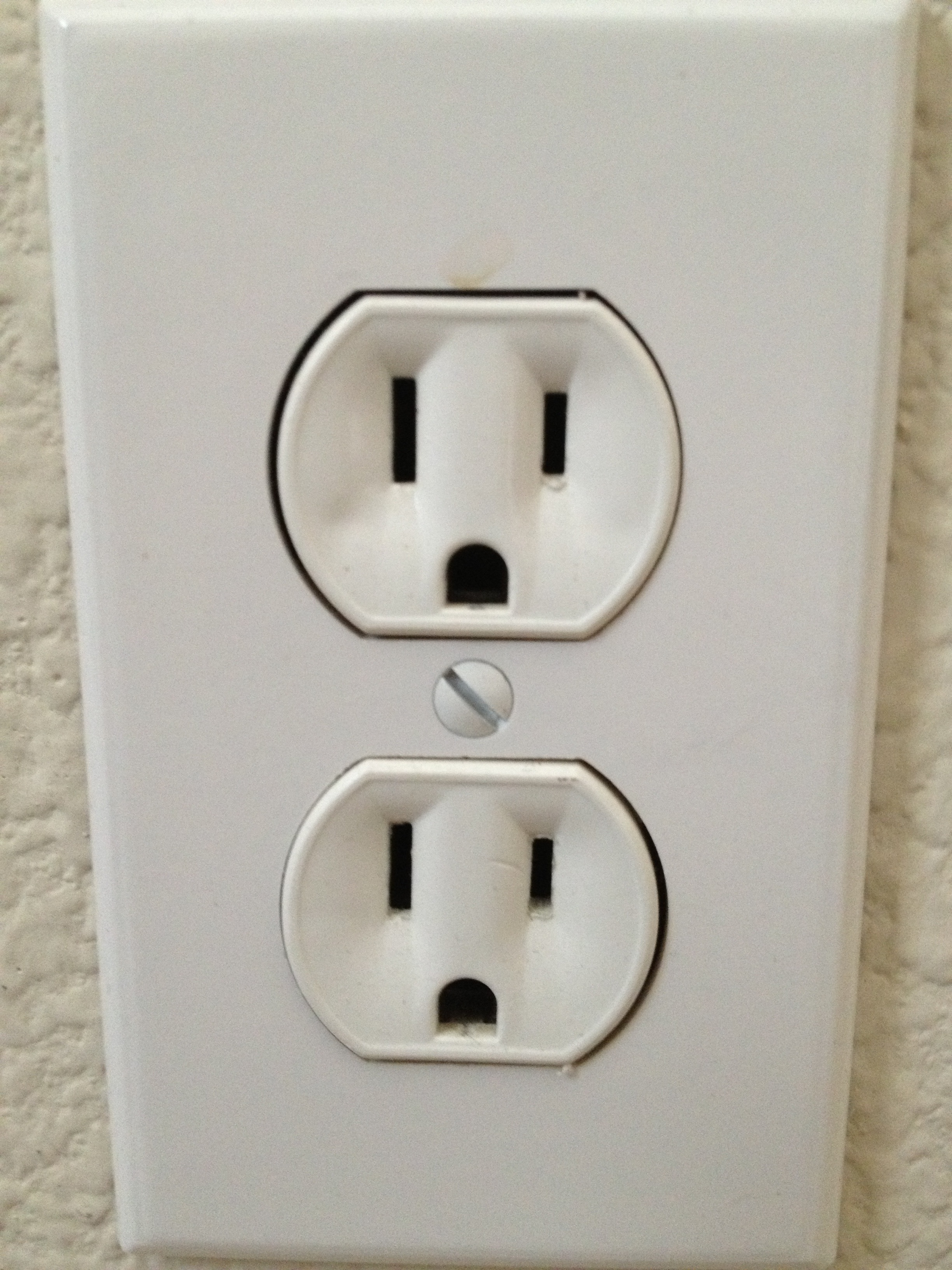
Typical 5-15R residential receptacle

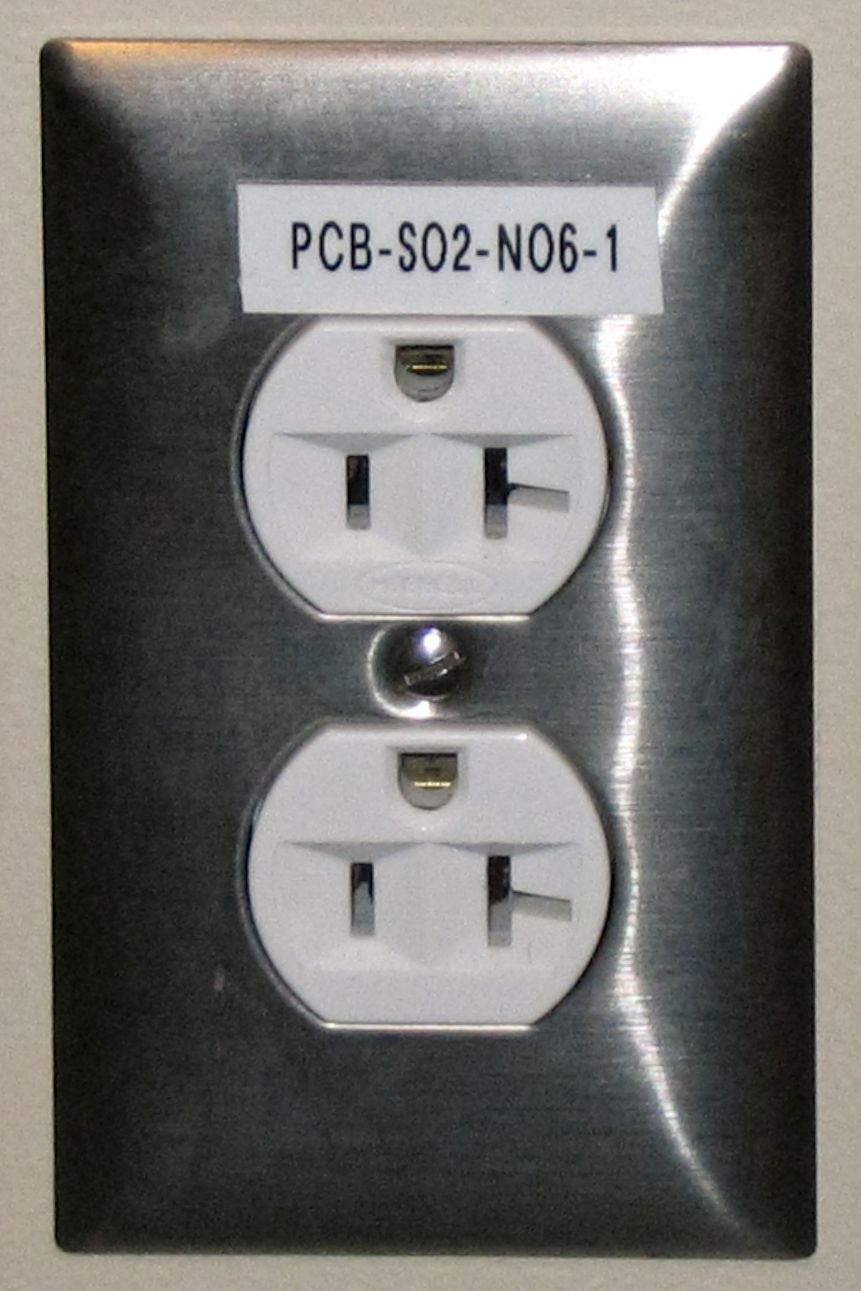
5-20R T-slot receptacle mounted with the hole for the ground pin at the top. The neutral connection is the wider T-shaped slot on the right.

All NEMA 5 devices are three-wire grounding devices (hot–neutral–ground) rated for 125 V maximum, with the 5-15, 5-20 and 5-30 being grounded versions of the 1-15, 1-20 and 1-30, respectively. The addition is a 3/16-inch (4.8 mm) diameter round or U-shaped ground pin, 1/8 in (3.2 mm) longer than the power blades (so the device is grounded before the power is connected) and located from them by 1/4 in (6.4 mm) edge-to-edge or 15/32 in (11.9 mm) center-to-center.

Compared to the 5-15P plug, the 5-20P plug has the neutral blade rotated 90° and shifted so its inner edge is approximately 1/2 in (12.7 mm) from the hot blade. The 5-20R receptacle has a T-shaped neutral hole, to accept both 5-15P and 5-20P plugs. An acceptable alternative version of the 5-20R receptacle has a rectangular slot that will accept only 5-20P plugs. The 5-30 and 5-50 are physically larger, with 1 in (25.4 mm) between power pins; 5-30 also has an L-shaped neutral blade. These larger sizes are uncommon, as twist-locking plugs are generally used for high-current applications.

The neutral blade on 5-15P plugs is not always wider than the line blade, since the ground pin enforces polarity.

The Electrical Safety Foundation International has stated: "Never remove the ground pin (the third prong) to make a three-prong plug fit a two-prong outlet". In addition to the dangers of breaking a ground connection, removing the ground pin to make it fit a 1-15R receptacle or extension cord, may result in the live–neutral polarity being lost.

The 5-15R and 5-20R are by far the most common electrical receptacle in North America in buildings built since the mid-twentieth century. It is usually installed in a duplex configuration; two receptacles may share a common circuit or may each be wired separately, sometimes to a switch.

In 46 of the 50 United States and all of Canada, tamper-resistant receptacles are required in new residential construction as of November 2013. These prevent contact by objects like keys or paper clips inserted into the socket. This is accomplished by an interlocking mechanism that requires hot and neutral blades inserted simultaneously to release the small doors blocking the slots. The grounding slot is not blocked by a door.

In stage lighting for film and theater, the 5-15R connector is sometimes informally known as PBG (Parallel Blade with Ground), U-ground, or Edison. In the motion picture and TV production industries, lighting technicians use extension cords with this connector, usually with 10-12 AWG wire, to deliver power to lights rated at 2,000 watts or less.

Internationally, the NEMA 5-15P plug and NEMA 5-15R receptacle are the basis for the International Electrotechnical Commission's IEC 60906-2 standard IEC system of plugs and sockets-outlets for household and similar purposes – Part 2: Plugs and socket-outlets 15 A 125 V a.c. and 20 A 125 V a.c.

=== NEMA 6 ===
All NEMA 6 devices are three-wire grounding devices (hot-hot-ground) used for 208 and 240 V circuits and rated for 250 V maximum, with the 6-15, 6-20 and 6-30 being grounding versions of the 2-15, 2-20 and 2-30, respectively. The 6-15 resembles the 5-15, but with collinear horizontal pins, spaced 23/32 in (18.3 mm) center-to-center. The 20 A plug has a blade rotated 90° (opposite blade from what would be the "line" blade on a 2-15 or 5-15 plug. This prevents accidental insertion of plugs into outlets that use different voltages), and the 6-20R receptacle has a T-shaped hole to accept both 6-15P and 6-20P plugs (similar to the 5-20R receptacle accepting 5-15P and 5-20P plugs). The 50 A (and 5-50) receptacles look like bigger versions of the 5-15 A. 6-15R and 6-20R receptacles are usually manufactured on the same assembly line as "Industrial" or "Commercial" grade 5-15R and 5-20R receptacles, with all four receptacles sharing the same "triple wipe" T contacts behind the varying faceplates. The faceplate bonded onto the receptacle determines the final configuration of the receptacle.

NEMA 6 devices, while specified as 250 V, may be used for either 208 or 240 V circuits, generally depending on whether the building has a three-phase or split-phase power supply, respectively. The NEMA 6-20R or 6-30R found in many hotel rooms is typically supplied with either split-phase or two phases of three-phase 208 V.

The higher-current receptacles are rare, with twist-locking plugs such as L6-30 and direct wiring being more common. Generally, 6-series non-locking plugs are used for such appliances as large room air conditioners and commercial kitchen equipment; the occasional home arc welder also uses 6-50. Single-phase 6-50 is commonly used on farms for silo unloaders, and is used with a 6-gauge flexible power cord up to 200 ft (61 m) long. The 6-50 receptacle charges electric vehicles at the same 32- or 40-ampere maximum from charging stations, on a short cord, as the more versatile 14-50 with its fourth prong neutral not used currently for any electric vehicle charging purposes.

NEMA 6-15 (Green "U"-shaped contact is ground.)

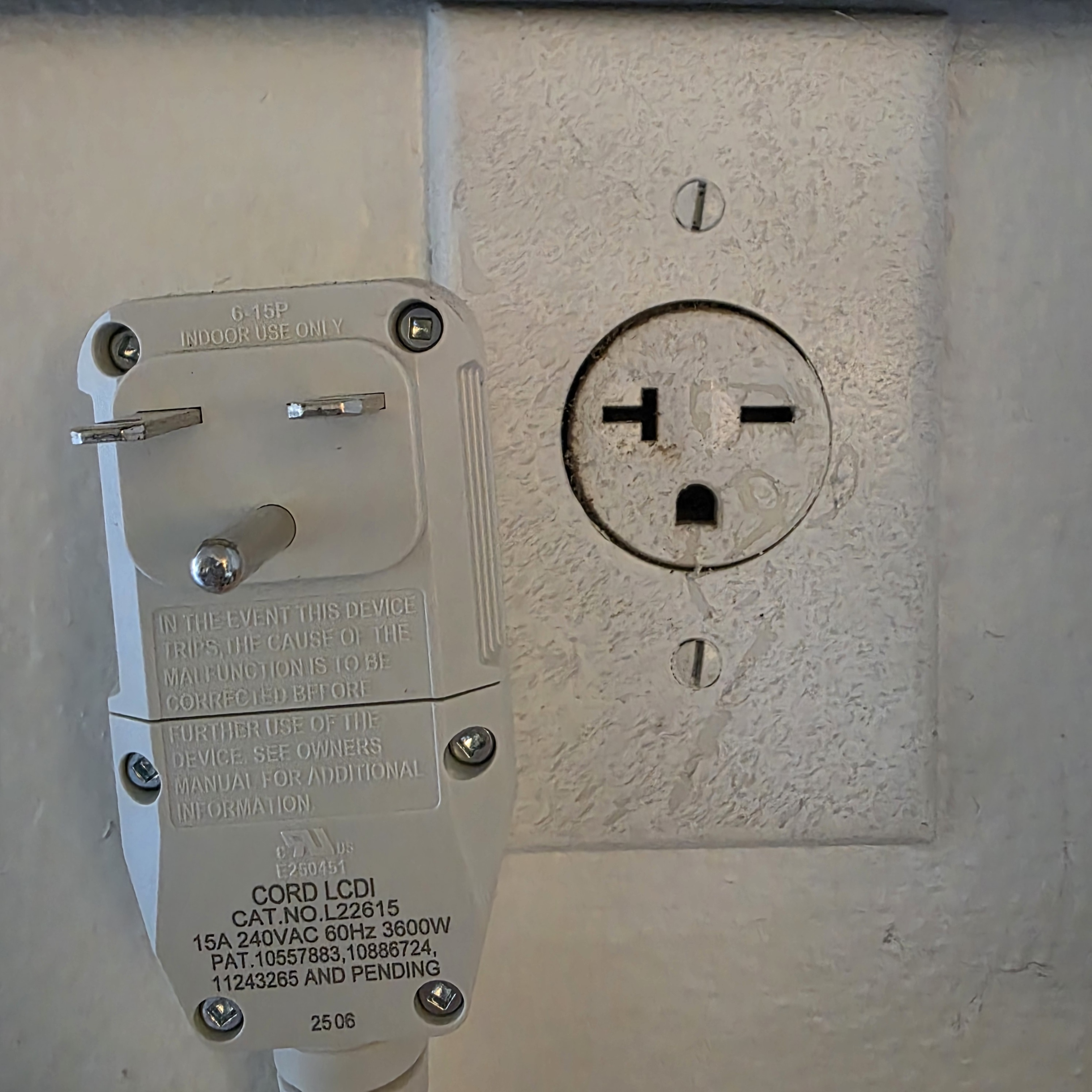
NEMA 6-15 plug next to a 6-20 receptacle

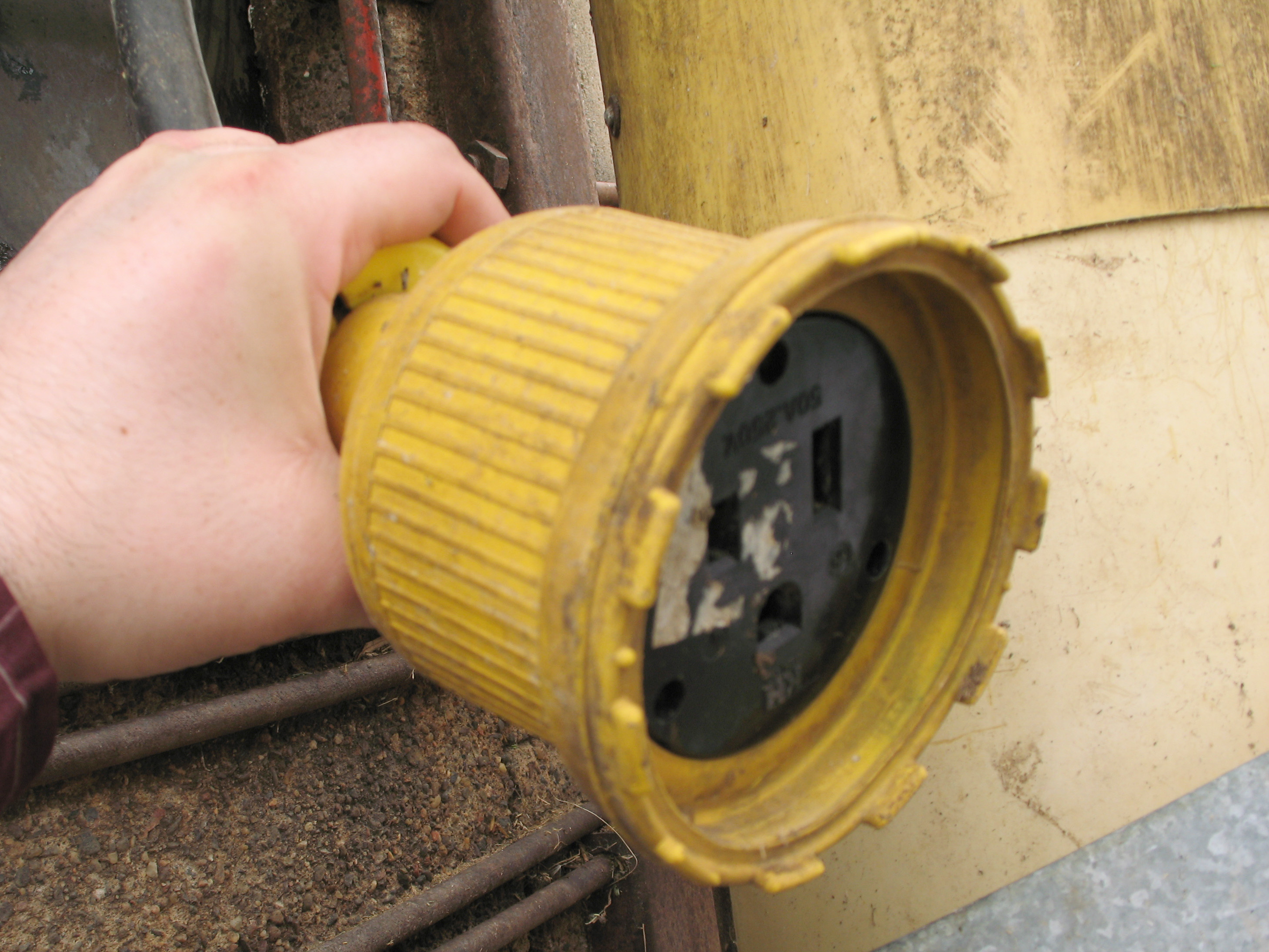
NEMA 6-50 with dustproof flexible shroud, used on a farm silo unloader

=== NEMA 7 ===
NEMA 7 devices are three wire/prong (hot-neutral-ground) connectors rated at 277 V. The 15 A 7-15 plug has the crowsfoot current carrying pins of the Type I plug, but with a U-shaped earth pin. The 7-20 version has an enlarged line/hot pin. 7-30 is a larger diameter connector, with an L-shaped neutral, while the 7-50 has an enlarged neutral pin, compared with the hot.

=== NEMA 8 ===
NEMA 8 devices are specified for three wire, two-pole, grounding devices for 480 volts. According to NEMA, this is "reserved for future configurations", so no designs for this series exist and no devices have been manufactured.

=== NEMA 9 ===
NEMA 9 devices are specified for three wire, two-pole, grounding devices for 600 volts. According to NEMA, this is "reserved for future configurations", so no designs for this series exist and no devices have been manufactured.

=== NEMA 10 ===
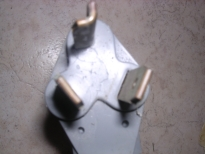
The now-deprecated NEMA 10-30 has a neutral pin (at top of photo), but does not have a dedicated safety grounding pin.

NEMA 10 connectors are a now deprecated type that had formerly been popular in the United States for use with high-power electric clothes dryers, kitchen ranges, and other high-power equipment. NEMA 14-30R and -50R connectors have generally replaced NEMA 10 equipment for these applications. NEMA 10s are classified as 125/250 V non-grounding (hot-hot-neutral), and were designed to be used in a manner that indirectly grounds the appliance frame to the neutral, which was common before the requirement of a separate safety ground was incorporated in the National Electrical Code.

As commonly used, 10-30 and 10-50 plugs required the frame of the appliance to be indirectly grounded via a strap connecting to the neutral blade. Safe operation relied on the neutral conductor in turn being connected to system ground at the circuit breaker or fuse box. If the neutral conductor were to break, disconnect, or develop high resistance, the appliance frame could become energized to dangerous voltages. Modern practice is to require a separate safety grounding conductor whose only purpose is to divert unsafe voltages, and which does not carry significant current during normal operation.

Relying on the neutral conductor was a legal grounding method for electric ranges and clothes dryers, under the National Electrical Code from the 1947 to the 1993 editions (banned in 1996 edition). Since North American dryers and ranges have certain components (timers, lights, fans, etc.) that run on 120 V, this means that the neutral wire indirectly used for grounding would also carry current, even under non-fault conditions. Although this is contrary to modern grounding practice, such "grandfathered" installations remain common in older homes in the United States.

=== NEMA 11 ===
NEMA 11 series devices are three wire, three-pole, non-grounding devices for 3-phase 250-volt designs and equipment parts are specified by NEMA for 20-ampere (11-20), 30-ampere (11-30), and 50-ampere (11-50) devices.

=== NEMA 12 ===
NEMA 12 series devices are three wire, three-pole, non-grounding devices for 3-phase, 480-volt equipment. According to NEMA, this is "reserved for future configurations", so no designs for this series exist and no devices have been manufactured.

=== NEMA 13 ===
NEMA 13 series devices are three wire, three-pole, non-grounding devices for 3-phase, 600-volt equipment. According to NEMA, this is "reserved for future configurations", so no designs for this series exist and no devices have been manufactured.

=== NEMA 14 ===
These sockets and plugs are four prong (see receptacle chart above) grounding devices (hot–hot–neutral–ground) available in ratings from 15 to 60 A. The voltage rating is 250 V. Of the straight-blade NEMA 14 devices, only 14-50 and 14-30 are in common use and either may be used for home charging of electric vehicles. The 14-30 is limited to 30 amperes (24 amperes continuous) and used mainly for some electric clothes dryers and some electric cooking stoves. The NEMA 14 connectors are essentially the replacements for the older NEMA 10 connectors described above, but with the addition of a dedicated grounding connection.

All NEMA 14 devices offer two hots, a neutral, and a ground, allowing for both 120 and 240 V when supplied by split-phase power, or 120 and 208 V if the supply is three-phase. The 14-30 has a rating of 30 A, and an L-shaped neutral blade. The 14-50 has a rating of 50 A, and a straight neutral blade sized so that it does not mate with 14-30 connectors.

NEMA 14-50 devices are frequently found in RV parks, since they are used for "shore power" connections of larger recreational vehicles. Also, it was formerly common to connect mobile homes to utility power via a 14-50 device. Newer applications include electric vehicle charging. The 6-50 is a smaller size receptacle lacking a neutral fourth prong, exclusively providing 240 V, also used for electric vehicle charging station purposes.

NEMA 14-30 and 14-50 receptacles

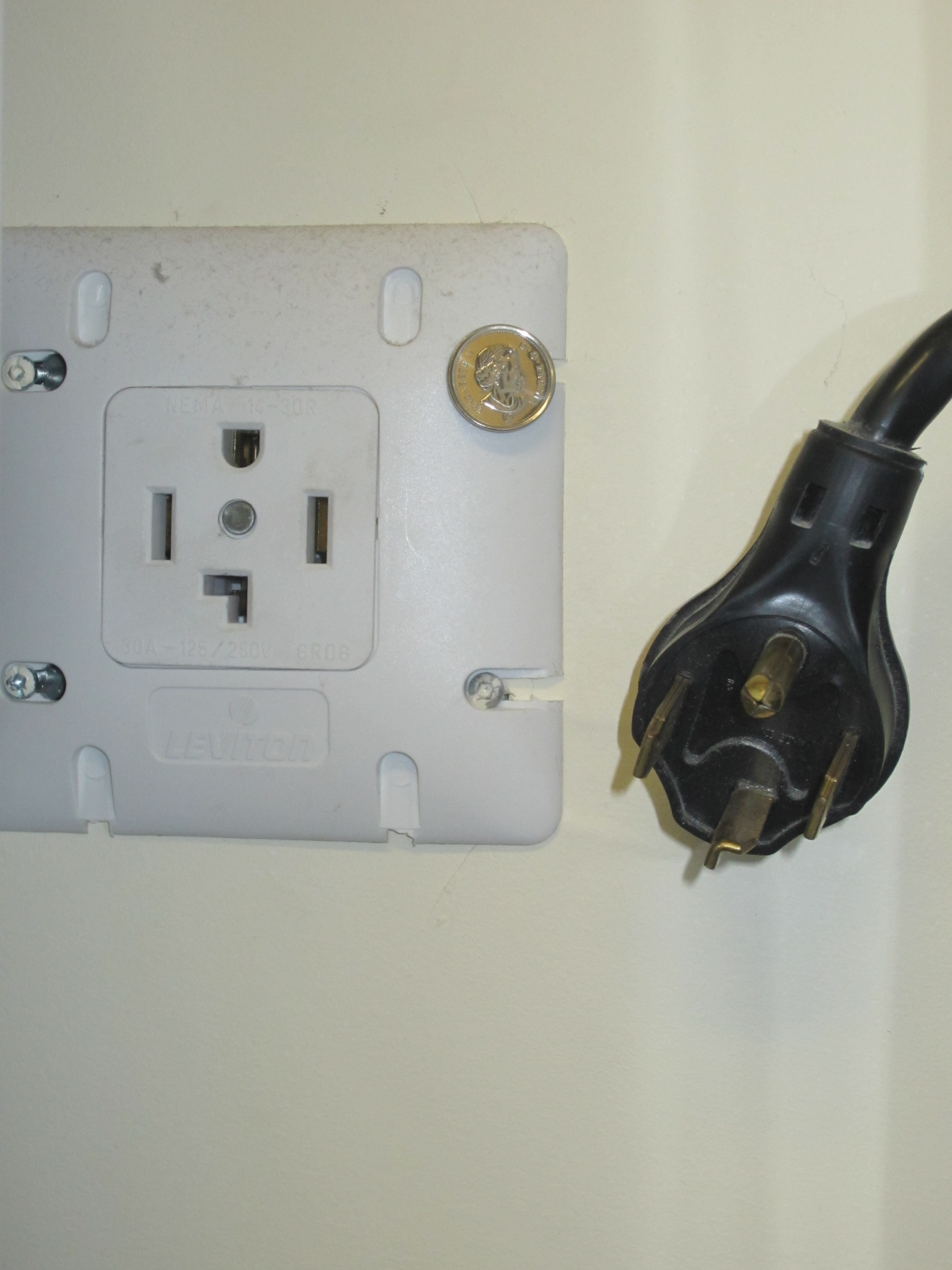
NEMA 14-30 clothes dryer receptacle and plug

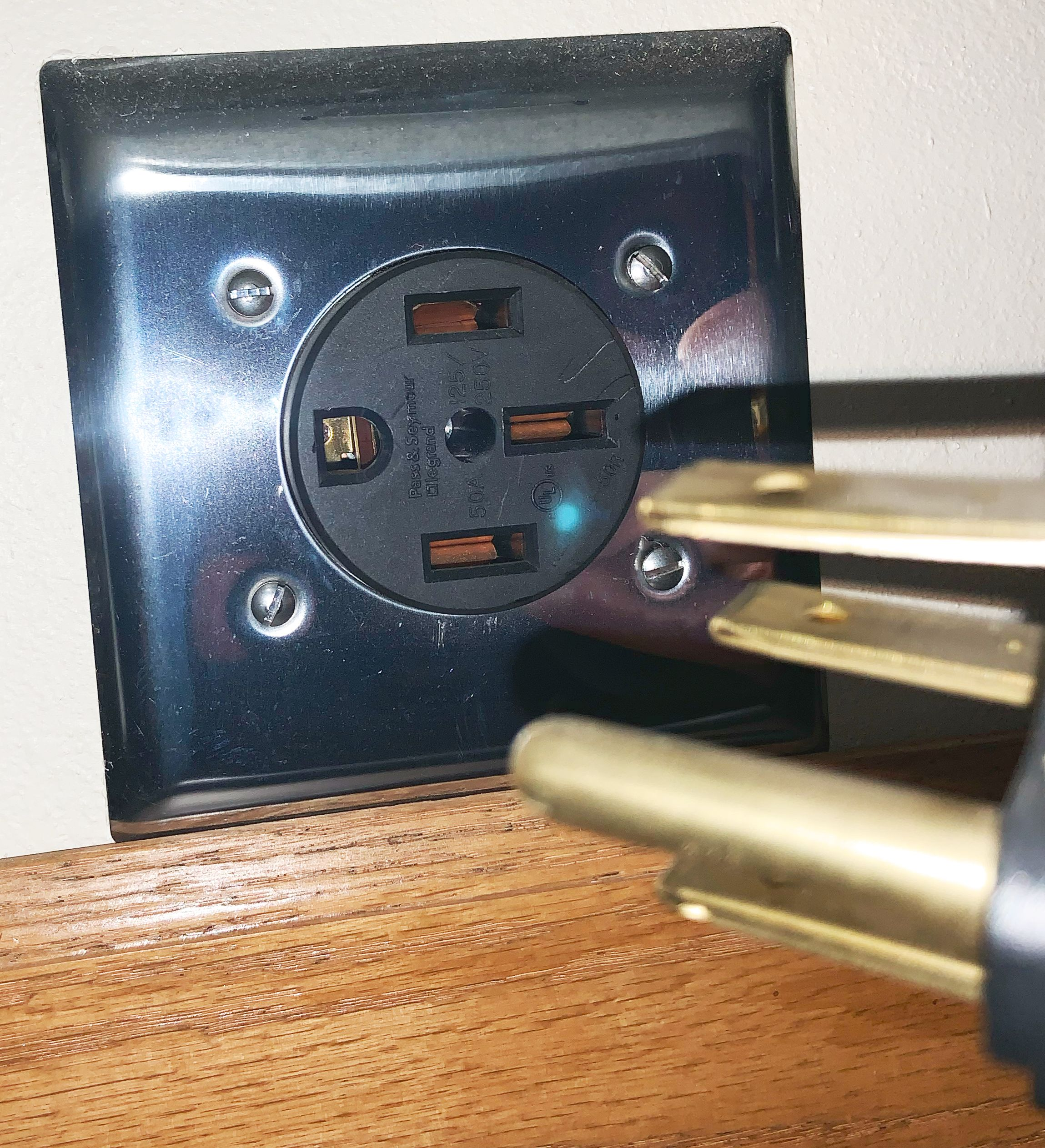
A NEMA 14-50 supplying 12 kW (9.6 kW sustained) on a 240 V circuit to recharge an EV

=== NEMA 15 ===
NEMA 15 series devices are three-pole, grounded connectors (X, Y, Z, G) rated up to 250VAC. Intended for delta three-phase circuits with ground and no neutral. The straight blades all carry one of the three phases.

=== NEMA 18 ===
NEMA 18 series devices are specified for 208/120Y three-pole, four-wire, non-grounding devices. NEMA 18 devices were and may continue to be manufactured, but have limited availability in 2025, and are considered obsolete due to the lack of a grounding conductor, with NEMA L21 a suitable replacement at 20- and 30-amperes.

=== NEMA 20 ===
NEMA 20 series devices are specified for 347/600Y three-pole, four-wire, non-grounding devices. According to NEMA, this is "reserved for future configurations", so no designs for this series exist and no devices have been manufactured.

=== NEMA 21 ===
NEMA 21 series devices are specified for three-pole plus neutral, five-wire grounding devices for 3-phase 120/208Y supplies. According to NEMA, NEMA 21 straight-blade devices are "reserved for future configurations", so no designs for this series exist and no devices have been manufactured. There are however NEMA L21 series locking devices for 20- and 30-ampere devices specified and available for these applications.

=== NEMA 22 ===
NEMA 22 series devices are specified for three-pole plus neutral, five-wire grounding devices for 3-phase 277/480Y supplies. According to NEMA, NEMA 22 straight-blade devices are "reserved for future configurations", so no designs for this series exist and no devices have been manufactured. There are however NEMA L22 series locking devices for 20- and 30-ampere devices specified and available for these applications.

=== NEMA 23 ===
NEMA 23 series devices are specified for three-pole plus neutral, five-wire grounding devices for 3-phase 347/600Y supplies. According to NEMA, NEMA 23 straight-blade devices are "reserved for future configurations", so no designs for this series exist and no devices have been manufactured. There are however NEMA L23 series locking devices for 20- and 30-ampere devices specified and available for these applications.

=== NEMA TT-30 ===
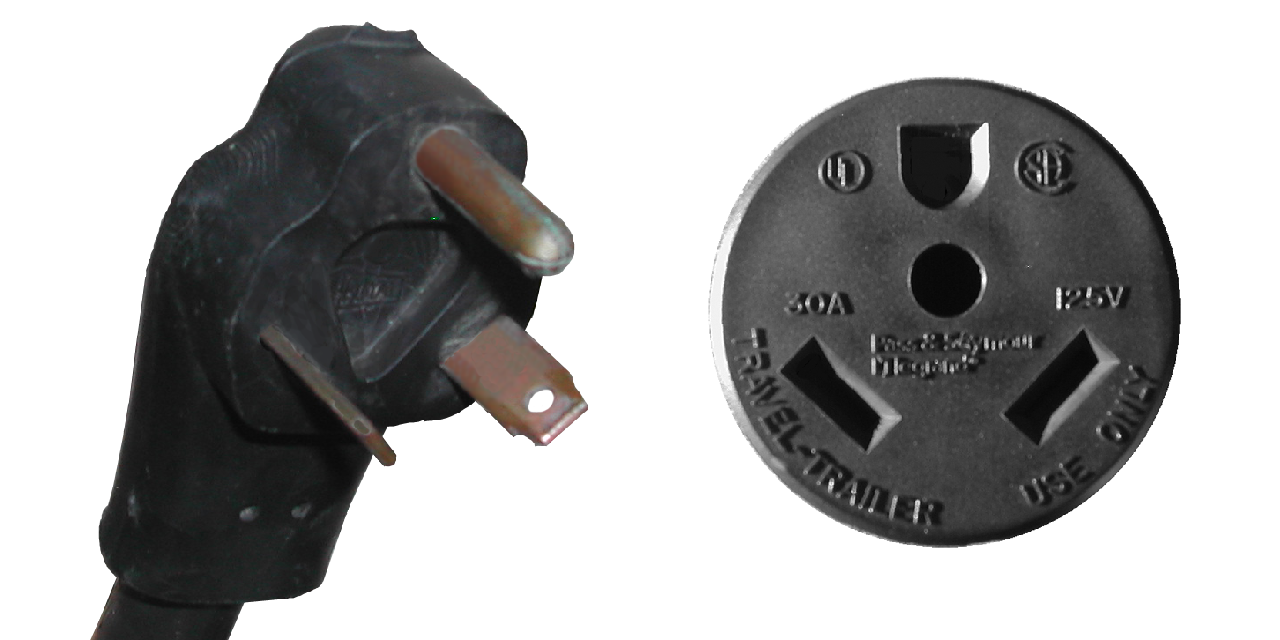
NEMA TT-30 plug and receptacle. (The center hole on the receptacle is not a contact.)

The NEMA TT-30 (TT stands for Travel Trailer) connector is a 120 V 30 A recreational vehicle standard (hot-neutral-ground), also known as RV 30. The TT-30R receptacle is commonly available in nearly all RV parks in the United States and Canada, and all but the largest RVs manufactured since the 1970s use this plug to connect to power feeds.

The appearance of this plug is sometimes confused with a NEMA 10 connector, rated for 240 V, but the NEMA TT-30 is a 120 V device. The hot and neutral blades are angled at 45° from vertical and 90° to each other, unlike NEMA 10 devices (where the angles are 30° and 60° respectively), also the plug is slightly smaller than a NEMA 10 and larger than ordinary 5-15P plugs. The ground pin is round, like those on straight-blade NEMA grounding devices. Referring to the picture, the orientation is the same as the NEMA 5 plug and receptacle, with the neutral blade on the lower right.

Adapters are available with the TT-30P plug on one side and a 5-15R or 5-20R receptacle on the other side. When a power feed cord is detachable from an RV, an L5-30P is usually used on the RV end of the cord.

== Twist-locking connectors ==
Twist-locking connectors were first invented by Harvey Hubbell III in 1938 and "Twist-Lock" remains a registered trademark of Hubbell Incorporated, although the term is used generically to refer to NEMA locking connectors manufactured by any company. Locking connectors use curved blades. Once pushed into the receptacle, the plug is twisted and its now-rotated blades latch into the receptacle. To unlatch the plug, the rotation is reversed. The locking coupling makes for a more reliable connection in commercial and industrial settings, where vibration or incidental impact could disconnect a non-locking connector.

Locking connectors come in a variety of standardized configurations that follow the same general naming scheme except that the designations include an "L" for "locking". Locking connectors are designed so that different voltages and current ratings can not be accidentally intermated. Many specific types exist; only a few are listed below. Other types include special purpose connectors for boats, 400 Hz circuits such as used for aircraft, and direct-current applications.

One apparent disadvantage of twist-lock connectors is that in the event that the cable is accidentally pulled too hard, rather than the plug falling out of the receptacle, exposed conductors may come out of the plug, causing dangerous shorts or shock hazards if the circuit is live. This is resolved in most cases by the connector having a robust integral strain relief.

=== ML ===
ML-series "Midget Locking" connectors are for 15 A applications where a larger locking connector would not fit.

- ML-1 connectors are two-pole, no ground, rated for 125 V.
- ML-2 connectors are two-pole with ground, rated for 125 V.
- ML-3 connectors are for three-pole no ground (hot-neutral-hot) rated for 125/250 V.

=== SS ===
SS-series "Ship-to-shore" connectors are for 50 A marine shore-power applications.

- SS1-50 connectors are two-pole with ground, rated for 125 V.
- SS2-50 connectors are three-pole with ground (hot-neutral-hot) rated for 125/250 V.

=== NEMA L1 ===
NEMA L1 series devices are single-pole plus neutral, two-wire, non-grounding devices for 125 volts single phase. Designs and devices for 15-ampere devices (L1-15) exist.

=== NEMA L2 ===
NEMA L2 series devices are two-pole, two-wire, non-grounding devices for 250 volts single-phase. Designs and devices for 20-ampere devices (L2-20) exist.

=== NEMA L3 and L4 ===
These devices would have been for 277- and 600-volt two-pole, two-wire non-grounding devices similar to the straight-blade NEMA 3 and 4 families, but were never specified by NEMA.

=== NEMA L5 ===
NEMA L5 connectors are a series of two-pole and ground locking connectors rated for 125 V. L5-30R receptacles are common at marinas that provide power to docked boats. They are also found on some RVs for connecting to shore power. RVs in the US are equipped for 120 V 30 A or 240 V 50 A service, and use a cord to connect to a receptacle at the campsite, usually on a power pedestal with one or more receptacles providing 120 V 30 A (TT30R), 240 V 50 A (14-50R), or 120 V 15/20 A (5-20R) service. Locking receptacles appropriate for the voltage and current are used on the RV end of the cord, along with non-locking plugs on the end connecting to the pedestal.

=== NEMA L6 ===
NEMA L6 connectors are rated for a maximum of 250 volts. They are intended for two-pole, three wire, line-line-earth (or hot-hot-ground) circuits with a nominal supply voltage of 208 or 240 volts, depending on phase configuration. The L6 connector does not provide a neutral connection.

L6-20 connectors provide a maximum of 20 amperes and are commonly found in power distribution units (PDUs) used in the information technology sector. Most often, these connectors can be found in server rooms and data centers where the connectors are used to power equipment such as servers, backup systems and UPS units.

L6-30 connectors provide a maximum of 30 amperes and tend to be used in heavy-industry sectors. For example, welders and other manufacturing machinery where industrial equipment or large power tools are commonplace.

=== NEMA L7 ===
NEMA L7 are two-pole and ground connectors rated for 277 V. Typically, these connectors are found in commercial or industrial lighting circuits, especially where metal halide lamps are common.

=== NEMA L8 ===
NEMA L8 are two-pole and ground connectors rated for 480 V. Intended for three-wire hot-hot-ground circuits.

=== NEMA L9 ===
NEMA L9 are two-pole and ground connectors rated for 600 V. Intended for three-wire hot-hot-ground circuits.

=== NEMA L10 ===
NEMA L10 series devices are two-pole plus neutral, three-wire, non-grounding devices for 125/250 volts single-phase. These are deprecated due to the lack of grounding but L10-20 and L10-30 devices are specified by NEMA and are commercially available.

=== NEMA L11 ===
NEMA L11 series devices are three-pole, three-wire, non-grounding devices for three-phase 250-volt devices. Designs exist for 15-ampere (L11-15), 20-ampere (L11-20), and 30-ampere (L11-30) devices, and L11-20 and L11-30 devices were commercially available from at least one manufacturer (Bryant Electric).

=== NEMA L12 ===
NEMA L12 series devices are three-pole, three-wire, non-grounding devices for three-phase 480-volt devices. Designs exist for 20-ampere (L12-20), and 30-ampere (L12-30) devices, and L12-20 and L12-30 devices were commercially available from at least one manufacturer (Bryant Electric).

=== NEMA L13 ===
NEMA L13 series devices are three-pole, three-wire, non-grounding devices for three-phase 600-volt devices. Designs exist for 30-ampere (L13-30) devices and L13-30 devices were commercially available from at least one manufacturer (Bryant Electric).

=== NEMA L14 ===
NEMA L14 are three-pole and ground connectors rated for 125/250VAC intended for three-pole, four-wire (split-phase) hot-hot-neutral-ground circuits with nominal supply voltages of 240VAC phase-phase and 120VAC phase-to-neutral.

These connectors are common on household backup generators, and on racks of power amplifiers in large audio systems.

=== NEMA L15 ===
NEMA L15 are three-pole and ground connectors rated for 250VAC. Intended for three-phase circuits.

=== NEMA L16 ===
NEMA L16 are three-pole and ground connectors rated for 480VAC. Intended for three-phase circuits.

=== NEMA L17 ===
NEMA L17 are three-pole and ground connectors rated for 600VAC. Intended for three-phase circuits.

=== NEMA L18 ===
NEMA L18 are four-pole no ground connectors rated for 120/208VAC. Intended for wye three-phase circuits.

=== NEMA L19 ===
NEMA L19 series devices are three-pole, four-wire, non-grounding devices for three-phase 277/480-volt devices. Designs exist for 20-ampere (L19-20), and 30-ampere (L19-30) devices, and L19-20 and L19-30 devices were commercially available from at least one manufacturer (Bryant Electric).

=== NEMA L20 ===
NEMA L20 series devices are three-pole, four-wire, non-grounding devices for three-phase 347/600-volt devices. Designs exist for 20-ampere (L12-20), and 30-ampere (L20-30) devices, and L20-20 and L20-30 devices were commercially available from at least one manufacturer (Bryant Electric).

=== NEMA L21 ===
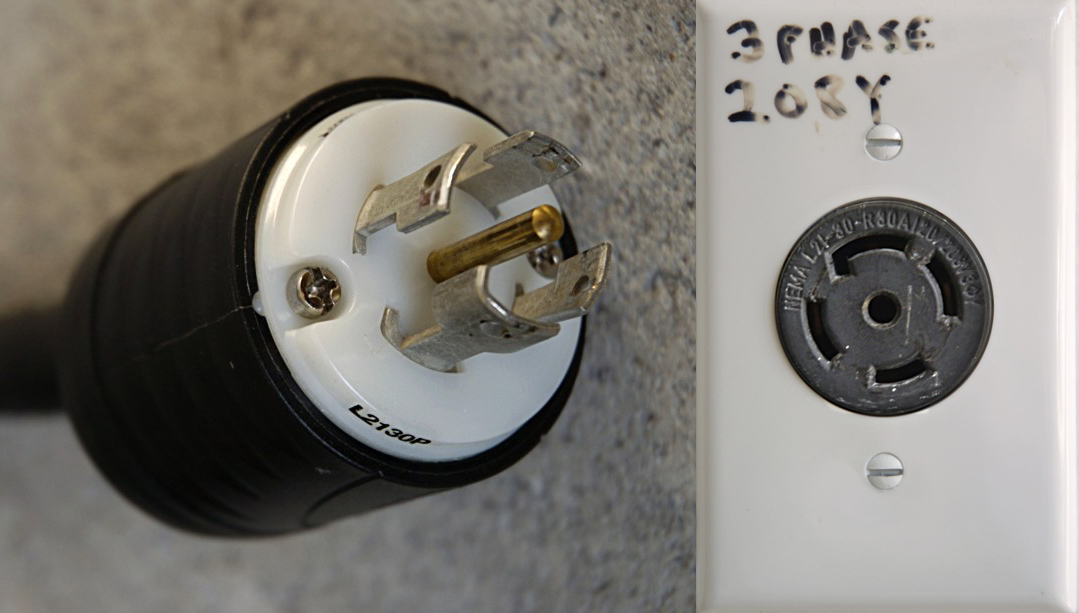
L21-30 plug and receptacle

NEMA L21 are four-pole and ground connectors rated for 120/208 V. Intended for wye three-phase circuits with both neutral and ground. The pin in the middle is ground, and the blade with a right angle on the tab is neutral. These connectors are common in live event power distribution. Many event production companies use power distributors with camlock connectors for feeder cable, and 12 or more L21-30 connectors which can each be broken out to three individual 120 V circuits via the use of a stringer box.

=== NEMA L22 ===
NEMA L22 are four-pole and ground connectors rated for 277/480 V. Intended for wye three-phase circuits with both neutral and ground. The pin in the middle is ground, and the blade with a right angle on the tab is neutral.

=== NEMA L23 ===
NEMA L23 are four-pole and ground connectors rated for 347/600 V. Intended for wye three-phase circuits with both neutral and ground. The pin in the middle is ground, and the blade with a right angle on the tab is neutral.

=== NEMA L24 ===
NEMA L24 are two-pole and ground connectors rated for 347 V. These are similar to the L5 (125 V) and L7 (277 V) specifications, containing two non-grounding wires where one is neutral.

=== NEMA L25 ===
NEMA L25 are two-pole and ground connectors rated for 240 V. These are similar to the L5 (125 V), L7 (277 V), and L24 (347 V) specifications, containing two non-grounding wires where one is neutral. In contrast to NEMA L6 which typically consists of two hot and one ground wire, NEMA L25 is expected to consist of one hot, one neutral, and one ground wire. The recommended configuration for IT usage is L25-30, which is used in single equipment branch circuits, and is not interchangeable with any other NEMA configuration.

NEMA L25 and L26 were created due to large IT installations wanting to operate their IT equipment in a 240 V line-to-neutral configuration (240/415 three-phase), similar to typical European standards. Whereas line-to-line supply voltage is required by code to be protected by a double-pole circuit breaker, line-to-neutral requires only a single-pole circuit breaker.

=== NEMA L26 ===
NEMA L26 are four-pole and ground connectors rated for 240/415 V. Intended for wye three-phase circuits with both neutral and ground. The pin in the middle is ground, and the blade with a right angle on the tab is neutral. The recommended configuration for IT usage is L25-30, and is not interchangeable with any other NEMA configuration.

== Additional safety features ==
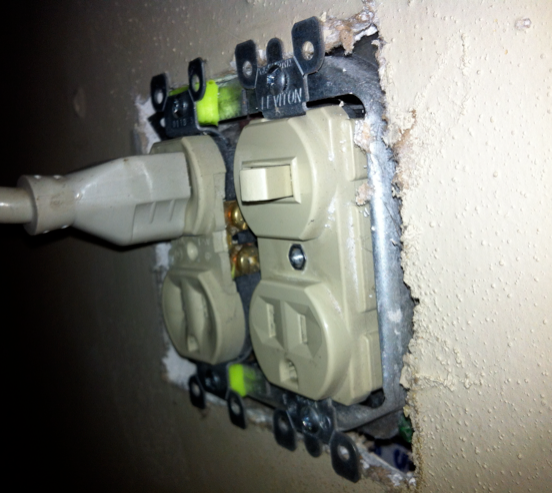
A North American NEMA-5 receptacle halfway through a corrective re-installation. The fluorescent green spacers, which firmly attach the receptacle to the metallic sub-structure, are made necessary by using 5/8 in (16 mm) drywall instead of 1/2 in (13 mm), or by slightly-misplaced device box housings.

Over time, electrical codes in the US and Canada began to require additional safety features in the basic NEMA 5-15R and 5-20R configurations to address specific electric shock hazard concerns. The safety features listed below are not mutually exclusive; for example, tamper-resistant GFCI receptacles are available.

=== Ground fault circuit interrupter (GFCI) receptacles ===
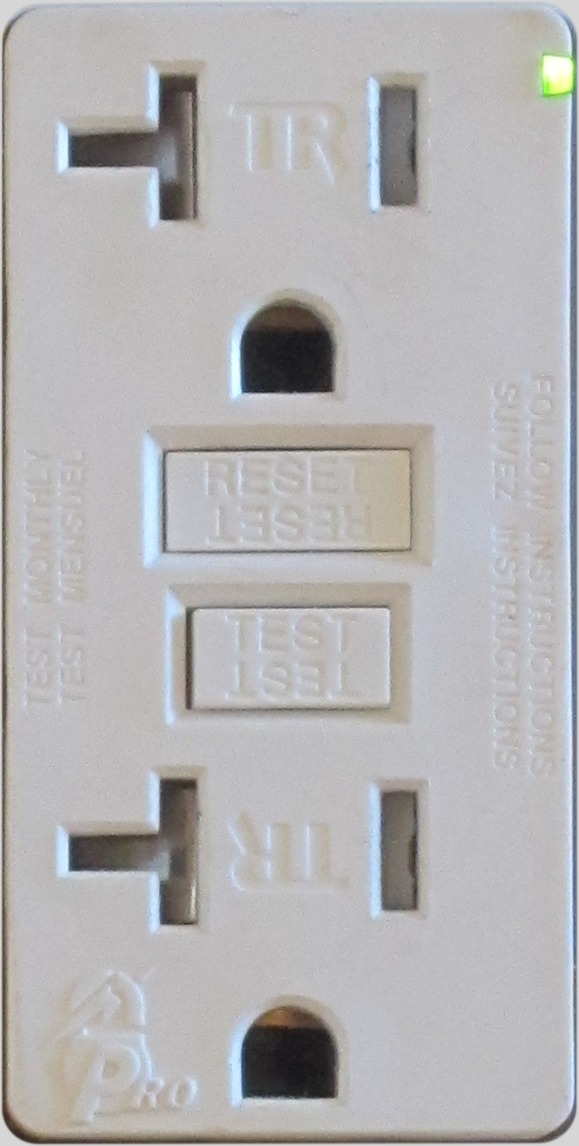
Tamper-resistant GFCI duplex receptacle type 5-20RA, which can take 5-15 and 5-20 grounding plugs and 1-15 non-grounding plugs

These versions of the 5-15R or 5-20R receptacle are residual-current devices, and have "Test" and "Reset" buttons (and sometimes an indicator light which may be normally on or normally off per the vendor's design). In the US and Canada, GFCI protection is required for receptacles in many potentially wet locations, including outside outlets, bathrooms, and some places in kitchens, basements, and crawl spaces. This is an expedient way to provide that protection at the receptacle itself.

These safety devices work by comparing the currents flowing in the live and neutral conductors, and disconnect the circuit if their difference exceeds 4 to 6 milliamperes. Installing a single receptacle is often cheaper or more convenient than providing this GFCI protection at the circuit breaker. In addition, a tripped GFCI receptacle may be more easily noticed and reset, as compared to a tripped GFCI located in a remote circuit breaker panel far from the point of usage.

Like most current interrupting devices, a GFCI receptacle can optionally be wired to feed additional "downstream" outlets; correctly installing one GFCI receptacle in a circuit can protect all the plugs, lights, switches, and wiring which receive power from it. This allows for cost-effective retrofits on older installations where branch circuits were often daisy-chained between wet and dry locations. A GFCI receptacle may be installed indoors where it is sheltered from dampness and corrosion, while still protecting an outdoors receptacle wired downstream.

GFCIs are also recommended for power tool outlets and any locations where children might insert conductive objects into the receptacles.

=== Tamper-resistant receptacles ===
Starting with the 2008 National Electrical Code and the 2009 Canadian Electrical Code, listed tamper-resistant receptacles that address electric shock hazards to children must now be installed in almost all areas of new or renovated dwellings. According to statistics cited by the NFPA, the code change adds only $40 to the cost of building an average, 75-receptacle home in the US.

This safety measure reduces shock hazards to a child who attempts to insert a single conductive object into the receptacle. Inserting a normal, two-blade electrical plug applies simultaneous pressure on both sides of the receptacle to open an internal, spring-loaded shutter, but a foreign object fails to do so and therefore cannot make contact with the live electrical contacts. However, the device can still be defeated by inserting two objects simultaneously. Despite its weaknesses, the tamper-resistant receptacle is superior to protective plastic outlet caps which must be individually installed on each receptacle (and are a choking hazard when removed), and to sliding covers that children easily learn to defeat.

=== AFCI receptacles ===
The 2014 edition of the National Electrical Code was updated to address the use of outlet branch circuit (OBC) arc-fault circuit interrupter (AFCI) receptacles as an alternative to traditional circuit breakers when used for modifications, extensions, replacement receptacles, or in new construction. AFCI receptacles reduce the dangers associated with potentially-hazardous arcing conditions (parallel arcs and series arcs), by interrupting power to arcing devices (e.g. a damaged appliance cord) that might otherwise not draw enough current to trip the primary circuit protection device.

AFCI protection is mandated by the 2014 Code in residential family rooms, dining rooms, living rooms, kitchens, parlors, libraries, dens, bedrooms, laundry rooms, sunrooms, recreation rooms, closets, hallways or similar rooms. It is also required in dormitory units. AFCI receptacles look similar to GFCI receptacles in that they have a "Test" and "Reset" button on the face of the device for localized testing. This saves a homeowner a trip to the breaker panel, should the device trip. Unlike AFCI breakers, AFCI receptacles can be used on any wiring system, regardless of the panel. When installed as the first receptacle on a branch circuit, AFCI receptacles can provide series arc protection for the entire branch circuit. They also provide parallel arc protection for the branch circuit downstream of the AFCI receptacle.

=== Surge protective receptacles ===
Surge protective devices are designed to reduce the random energy surges of voltage transients and electrical noise on the power supply line, which can damage sensitive electronics such as TVs, computers, and smart appliances. They are available for 120 V, 15/20 A applications, in different form factors such as surge protective receptacles in single, duplex, four-in-one, and six receptacle configurations, as well as surge-protective power strips. These devices provide point-of-use protection and are the last line of defense in a whole-house surge protection network.

=== Leak-current detection and interruption (LCDI) cordsets ===
Damaged power cords of portable air conditioners have caused many electrical fires, and about 350 deaths per year. To combat this, the 2017 National Electrical Code (NEC) requires each portable air conditioner sold in the United States to have either a leakage current detector interrupter (LCDI) or a ground-fault circuit interrupter (GFCI) protective device built into its power cord. The device can be integral with the power plug, or a separate module within 12 inches of the plug. The protection device is equipped with "Test" and "Reset" buttons on the housing. An LCDI cord has a fine wire mesh around the conductors, and circuitry to detect current leaking from the conductors to the mesh, which would happen if the cord were damaged or frayed. The plugs are normal NEMA 5-15, 5-20, 6-15, 6-20, or 6-30 plugs, depending on the air conditioner design, and are typically molded-on designs.

== Color code ==
The color of a device neither identifies its voltage class nor power system. Because the colors are not specified by NEMA standards, the purpose of color-coding a receptacle may be set by the building owner, who may select brown, ivory, white, almond, grey, or black receptacles in the 5-15 configuration to blend with the decor of a room.

However, although colors are not standardized by NEMA, some industries utilize colors for certain applications, following de facto standards:

- A receptacle with a green dot is a so-called "hospital grade" device. Hospital-grade receptacles have a greater contact tension, which minimizes the possibility of a plug supplying medical equipment slipping out of the receptacle. Also such devices are tested to survive harder use while limiting electrical leakage, compared to wiring devices intended for residential or commercial purposes.
- Per UL Standard ANSI/UL 498, a receptacle (any color) with an orange triangle is an isolated ground (IG) device, where the grounding pin of the receptacle is connected to ground independently of the frame of the receptacle and wiring outlet box. This is also a requirement of the National Electrical Code (NFPA 70), Article 406. While neither UL nor the CSA require the face of the receptacle to be a specific color, most IG receptacles are orange.
- A blue receptacle may indicate built-in surge suppressors.
- A red receptacle may indicate a special-service outlet such as one connected to an emergency standby power source. The Canadian Electrical Code requires that "essential" receptacles in hospitals, connected to emergency power systems, must be red.

== Break-away tabs ==
Most duplex receptacles have metal tabs connecting the top and bottom receptacles. These tabs can be broken off to allow the top and bottom receptacles to be wired onto separate circuits. This may allow for one switched receptacle for a lamp, or for two separate supply circuits when heavy loads are anticipated. Two branch circuits may optionally share a common neutral wire terminating on duplex receptacles, a condition sometimes referred to as "split-wiring", "split-receptacle", or "half-split".

== Related standards ==
The dimensions and configurations for NEMA connectors are given in ANSI/NEMA standard WD-6. Underwriters Laboratories maintains UL Standard 498, which specifies construction performance (e.g. durability, electrical safety, and fire-resistance) for NEMA connectors. These additional requirements allow connectors to be manufactured to be compliant with the National Electrical Code. The Defense Logistics Agency and General Services Administration maintain Federal Specification W-C-596 and its associated specification sheets. This specification references WD-6 and UL 498, and provides additional durability and electrical safety performance criteria for connectors intended for military use.

== Precedents ==
In the early days of electrification, residential use was almost exclusively for illumination, with rooms normally having just a single electrical outlet spot in the center. Along with his lightbulb, Thomas Edison developed the Edison screw in the early 1880s, patented 1881. The Edison screw was very successful, and quickly became the first de facto standard for electric connection. In the early 1900s, table and floor lamps became more popular, and sockets were mounted on walls for secondary connections. One big disadvantage of screw connectors was that the cord inevitably got twisted after being connected to the receptacle.

=== Harvey Hubbell's inventions ===
In 1903, Harvey Hubbell filed the U.S. patent 774,250, for a lightbulb socket adaptor and plug, also a standalone receptacle. The adaptor was screwed into the lightbulb socket, leaving a flat face with two holes to conveniently attach the plug. The same patent had a second design, with a wall attachable receptacle, capable of receiving the same plug, thus being the first socket and plug design patented in the US. Later in 1904, he changed the design to flat blades (a design later incorporated in the NEMA 2 series), filled under the U.S. patent 774,251 Both these patents were granted in November 1904.

In 1910, Hubbell worked on improving his popular flat blade design, filled U.S. patent 1,064,833 in 1912. The new design had parallel blades, a more compact design and was easier to manufacture. This design was improved once again in 1915, introducing a polarized plug under the U.S. patent 1,180,648. The flat blade plug which in subsequent years evolved to become NEMA 1-15 was born.

Some of Hubbell's patents:
U.S. patent 774,250, fig. 1, illustrating a lightbulb socket adaptor and an attachable flat blade socket for it.

U.S. patent 1,064,833, fig. 1 and 3. First patent showing the parallel blades which became NEMA 1-15.

U.S. patent 1,180,648 fig. 4 and 5, showing a concept for polarized receptacle and plug.

==== Other American manufacturers ====
In addition to Hubbell's system, a large variety of different plugs and receptacles circulated, some of them compatible with Hubbell's, some not. In 1919, Hubbell unsuccessfully tried to prevent other manufacturers from making receptacles and plugs to the dimensions used by Hubbell. The report of the court proceedings includes a comprehensive review of the development of the art in the US prior to 1919, based on evidence presented to the court. Separable plugs had been available for more than a decade prior to Hubbell's 1904 design.

=== NEMA ===
In 1926, the National Electrical Manufacturers Association (NEMA) was founded by the merger of the Electric Power Club and the Associated Manufacturers of Electrical Supplies and represented manufacturing companies of the electrical segment in a national level. NEMA provided a forum between companies for reaching standardization, but it was not until the 1940s that NEMA started to publish standards on receptacles and plugs, much later than UK, France and Germany. Since NEMA was a forum between manufacturers and not a governmental body, any decision had to be thoroughly discussed and agreed upon by its members, which substantially slowed the standardization process.

== See also ==
- AC power plugs and sockets
- BS 1363, British three-pin plugs and sockets
- CEI 23-50, Italian three-pin plugs and sockets
- CEE 7 standard AC plugs and sockets, pan-European
- IEC 60320, an international standard for power "inlet" connectors on equipment
- Industrial and multiphase power plugs and sockets § North America, which includes some non-NEMA plugs and sockets used in North America
- Mains electricity by country
- SN 441011, Swiss two/three-pin plugs and sockets
