= Powerlock =

High-current electrical connector

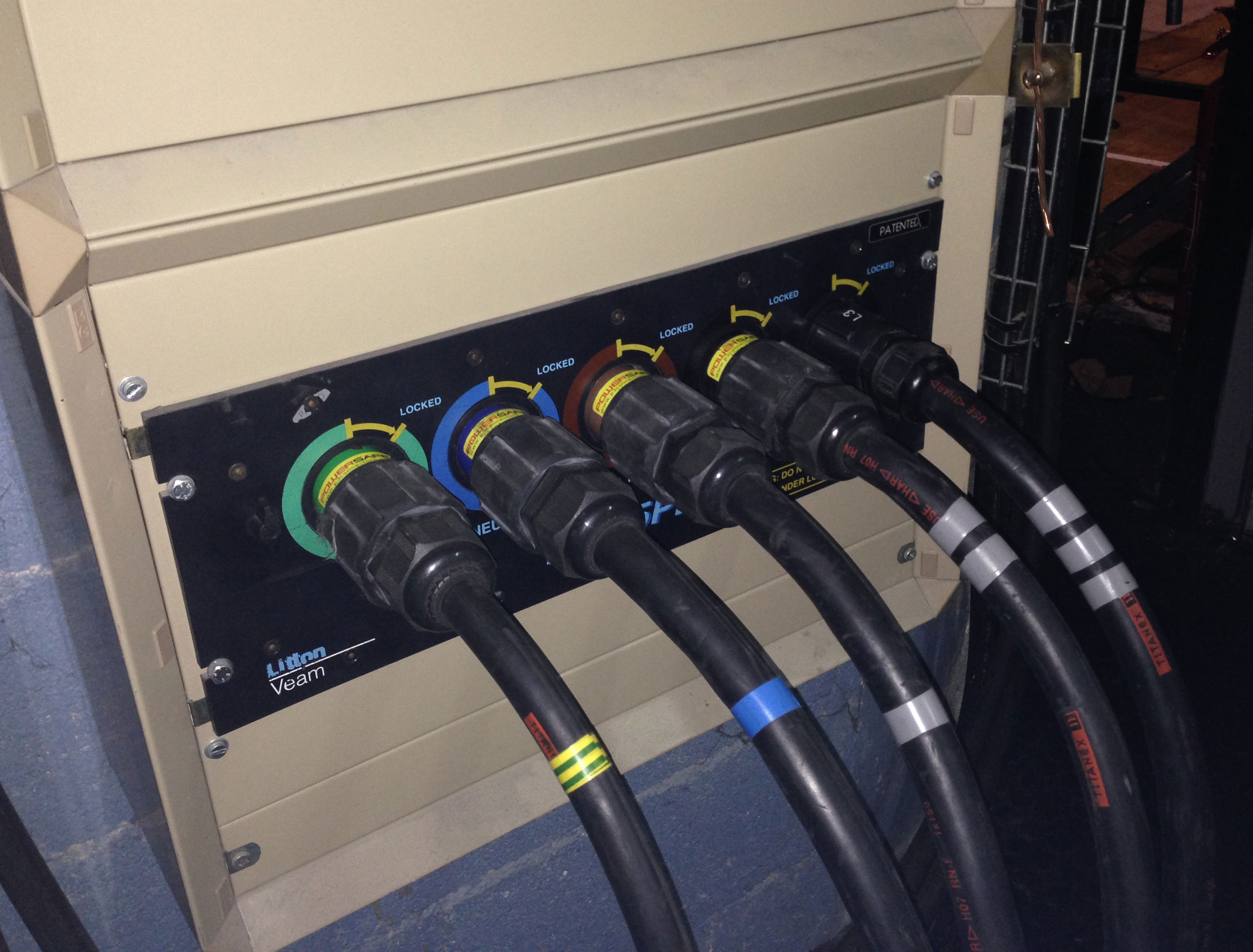
Panel Source connectors mated with Line Drain connectors. 3P+N+E. For scale, the cables are approximately 25 mm (1 in) in diameter.

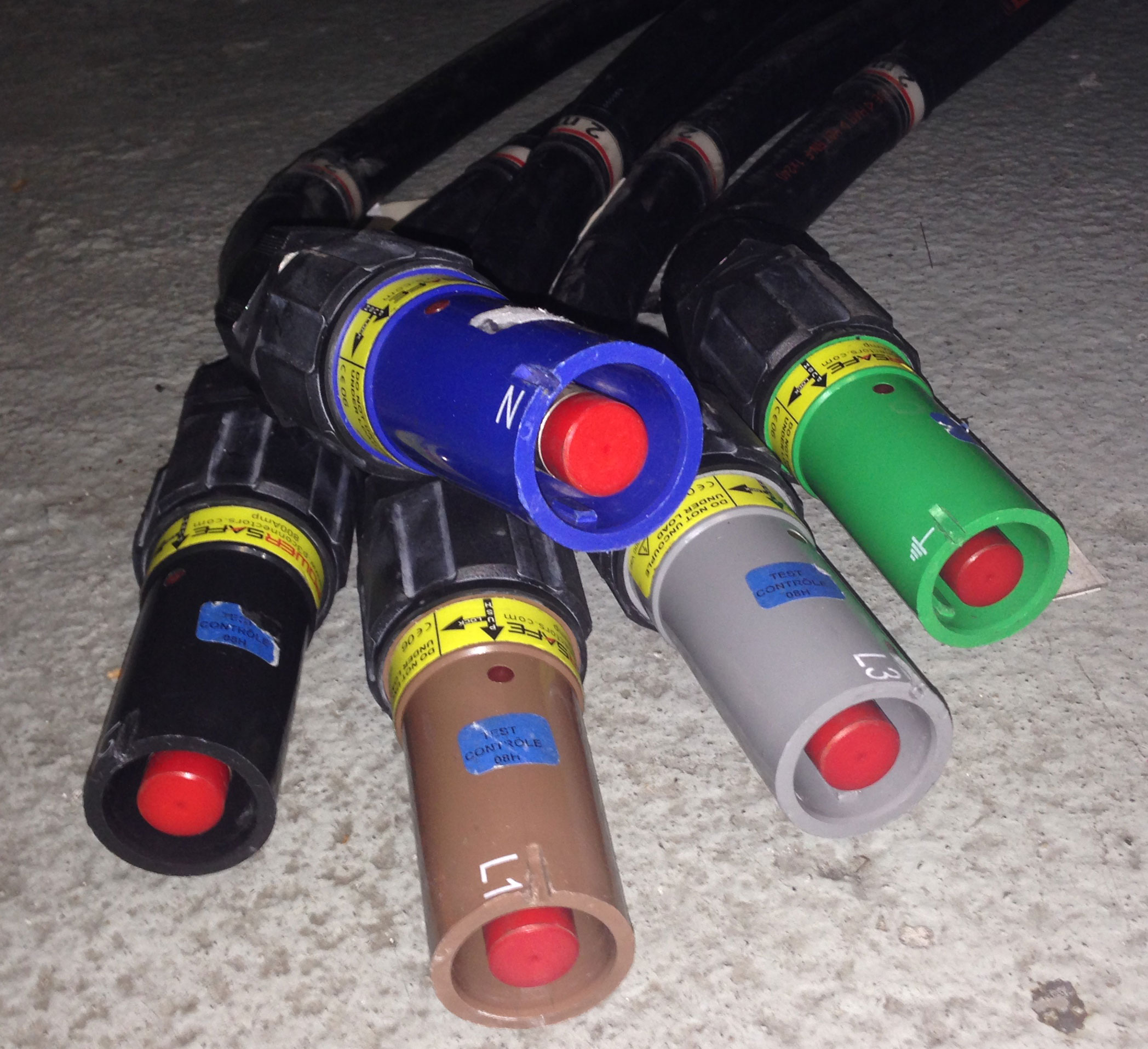
Inline Source (male) connectors unmated. Note red caps providing touch protection of live contact to IP2X.

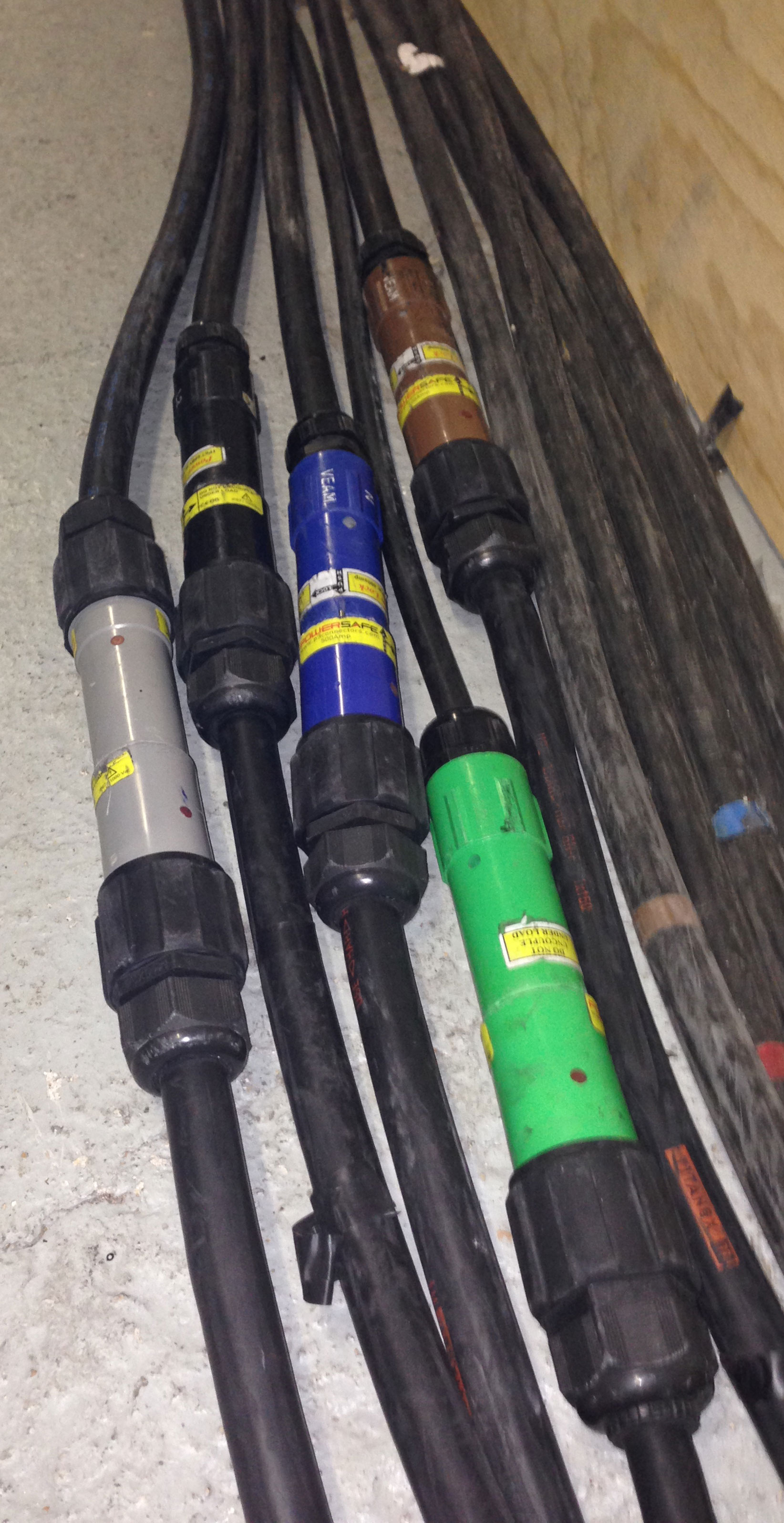
Line Source connectors (top) mated with Line Drain connectors (bottom).

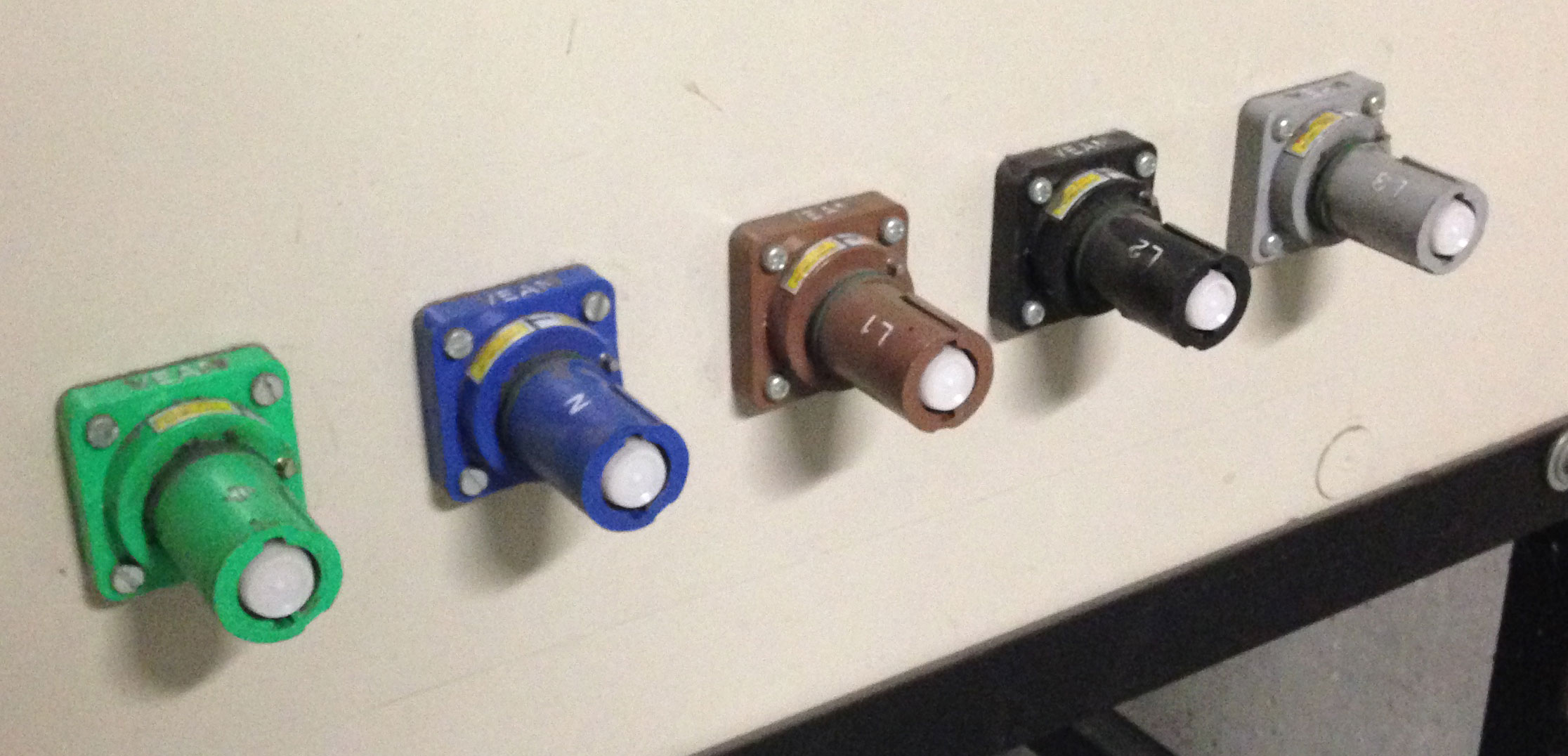
Panel Drain (female) connectors, for feeding power in to a portable distribution cabinet

Powerlock is a range of single-pole electrical connectors used for temporary high-current, low-voltage (up to 1000 V AC) applications, similar to but considered safer than camlock connectors. Originally developed by Litton Veam in the mid-1990s, VEAM Powerlock is now a brand of ITT Cannon. Compatible versions are also available from other manufacturers.

Powerlock connectors are available in 400 A and 660 A versions. All versions can be used for single-phase and, much more commonly, three-phase applications. Three phase connections require five separate cables (or four if neutral is not required).

== Applications ==
Single-pole power connectors are employed for making electrical power connections where multi-pole connectors and cables would be impractical to handle due to size, weight and cable bend radius. They are typically used for connecting to large generators and fixed power sources in venues where high-powered temporary equipment may be regularly used. Powerlock inputs are available on many large dimmers and on large power distribution units. Common application fields are entertainment, sport events, airports, mining industry, railways industry, military and emergency missions.

A range of Powerlock connectors which attach directly to busbars is available. These can be used for drawing off power for temporary installations, or for feeding power into busbars in situations such as temporary generator hook-ups during power outages.

== Safety ==
The Powerlock connector has safety features that help to protect the user against potentially fatal electric shock and other dangers as a result of connection errors. Such features include finger proof electrical contacts, colour-coded insulators, mechanical keys and locking devices.

Powerlock-style connectors can be used with sequential mating units. These units assist with the safe and controlled connection of the single-core power cables, by controlling the sequence of connection to ensure earth and neutral connections are made before phase connections can be made, thereby improving safety by reducing potential for connection errors and ensuring safety connections are always made.

Powerlock features a locking mechanism which requires the use of a special tool to disconnect the connector.

Nevertheless, the potential exists for connection errors, such as failing to properly connect earth or neutral, attempting connection / disconnection under load, incomplete connection of parallel circuits, or inappropriate combinations of circuit breakers and downstream equipment. For this reason all single-pole connectors including Powerlock are intended to be operated (connected and disconnected) only by trained professionals.

== Colours ==
Powerlock connectors are available in colours to match wiring colour standards used in Europe, Australia and North America. The mechanical keying is however independent of the colours, for example a blue connector intended for a neutral connection in Europe will not connect with a blue connector intended for live (phase) connection in North America.

== Gender ==
Powerlock connectors are designated as source or drain. The source connectors are intended to have their permanent connection at the supply of electrical energy (such as a connection to the electrical grid or an emergency generator), and the drain connectors are intended to have their permanent connection at the equipment receiving power. The role of male and female connectors is opposite to traditional usage in other designs of power connector - the Powerlock source connector has a male pin and the drain connector has a female receptacle. This does not however compromise safety because the gap between the plastic insulating cap on the male pin of the source connector and the surrounding plastic housing is too small to insert a human finger. The female drain connector also has a spring-loaded plastic cap to prevent dirt ingress and casual contact with the electrical contact; however with sufficient pressure this can be displaced with a finger.

== See also ==
- Camlock (electrical)
- IEC 60446 - for wiring standard colours.
- Industrial and multiphase power plugs and sockets
