= Industrial and multiphase power plugs and sockets =

Type of plug and socket design

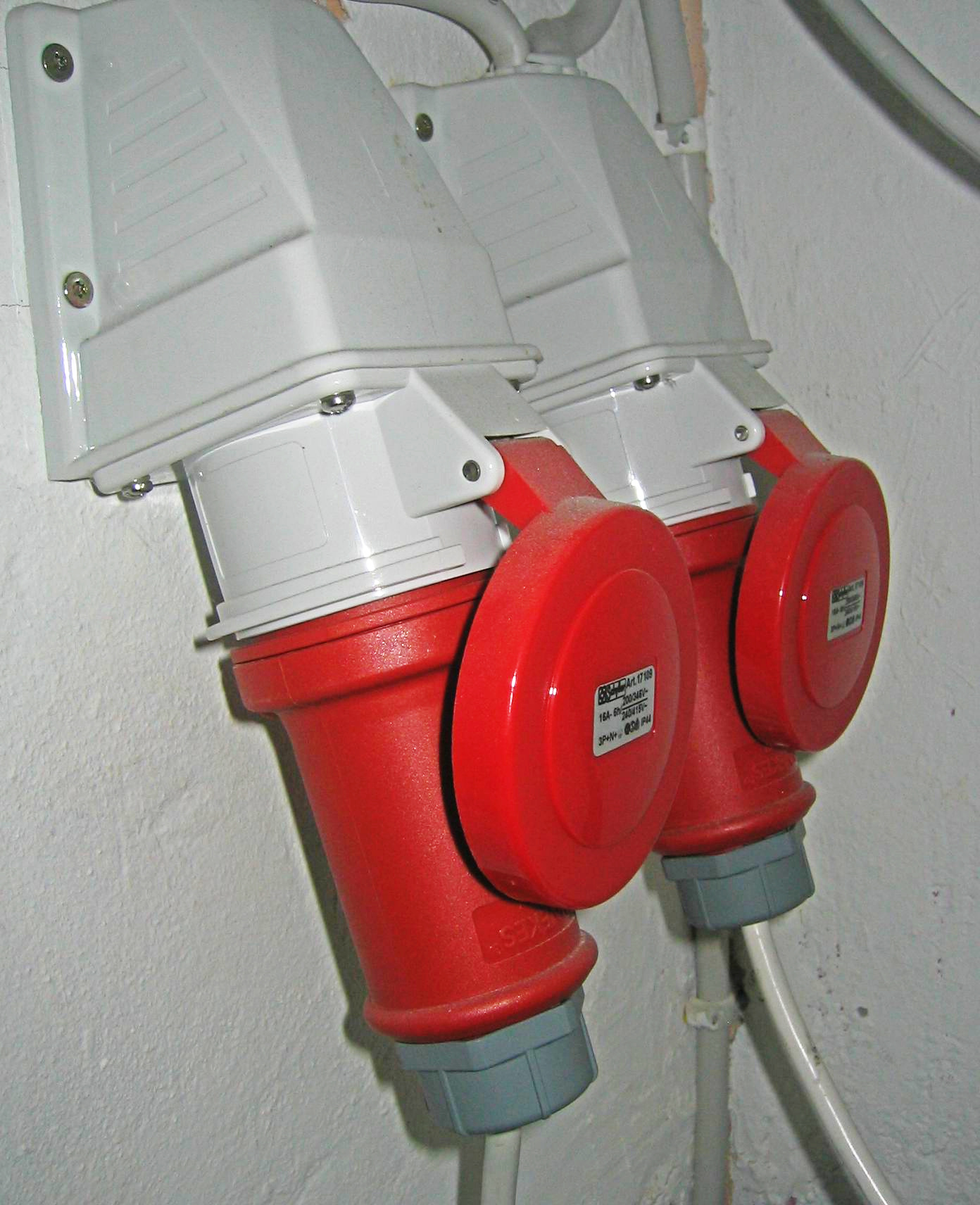
IEC 60309-style plugs inserted into wall-mounted sockets

Industrial and multiphase plugs and sockets provide a connection to the electrical mains rated at higher voltages and currents than household plugs and sockets. They are generally used in polyphase systems, with high currents, or when protection from environmental hazards is required. Industrial outlets may have weatherproof covers, waterproofing sleeves, or may be interlocked with a switch to prevent accidental disconnection of an energized plug. Some types of connectors are approved for hazardous areas such as coal mines or petrochemical plants, where flammable gas may be present.

Almost all three-phase power plugs have an earth (ground) connection, but may not have a neutral because three-phase loads such as motors do not need the neutral. Such plugs have only four prongs (earth, and the three phases). An example of a socket with neutral is the 3P+N+E which have five pins (earth, neutral, and X, Y, Z phases).

While some forms of power plugs and sockets are set by international standards, countries may have their own different standards and regulations. For example, the colour-coding of wires may not be the same as for small mains plugs.

== Concepts and terminology ==
Generally the plug is the movable connector attached to an electrically operated device's mains cable, and the socket is fixed on equipment or a building structure and connected to an energised electrical circuit. The plug has protruding pins or, in US terminology, blades (referred to as male) that fit into matching slots or holes (called female) in the sockets. A plug is defined in IEC 60050 as an accessory having pins designed to engage with the contacts of a socket-outlet, also incorporating means for the electrical connection and mechanical retention of flexible cables or cords, a plug does not contain components which modify the electrical output from the electrical input (except where a switch or fuse is provided as a means of disconnecting the output from input). In this article, the term 'plug' is used in the sense defined by IEC 60050. Sockets are designed to prevent exposure of bare energised contacts.

To reduce the risk of users accidentally touching energized conductors and thereby experiencing electric shock, plug and socket systems often incorporate safety features in addition to the recessed slots or holes of the energized socket. These may include plugs with insulated sleeves, recessed sockets, sockets with blocking shutters, and sockets designed to accept only compatible plugs inserted in the correct orientation.

The term plug is in general and technical use in all forms of English, common alternatives being power plug, electric plug, and (in the UK) plug top. The normal technical term (in both British and International English) for an AC power socket is socket-outlet, but in non-technical common use a number of other terms are used. In British English the general term is socket, but there are numerous common alternatives, including power point, plug socket, wall socket, and wall plug. In American English receptacle and outlet are common, sometimes with qualifiers such as wall outlet, electrical outlet and electrical receptacle, all of these sometimes to be found in the same document.

Electrical sockets for industrial, commercial and domestic purposes generally provide two or more current carrying (live) connections to the supply conductors. These connections are classified as poles. A pole will be either a neutral connection or a line

Neutral is usually very near to earth potential, usually being earthed either at the distribution board or at the substation. Line (also known as phase or hot, and commonly, but technically incorrectly, as live) carries the full supply voltage relative to the neutral (and to earth).

Single phase sockets are classified as two pole (2P) and provide a single line contact and a neutral contact. In addition, a protective earth (Ground in American terminology) contact is usually, but not always, present, in which case the socket is classified as two pole and earth(2P+E).

Three phase sockets provide three line contacts, they may also include either or both of a neutral and protective earth contact. The designations of the three contacts may vary. The IEC standards use the Line designations L1, L2 and L3. NEMA standards use the Phase designations X, Y and Z.

Sockets intended for use with the American split Phase distribution system may have two line contacts and neutral. In this case the line designators X and Y are used. They may also include a protective earth contact.

== World ==
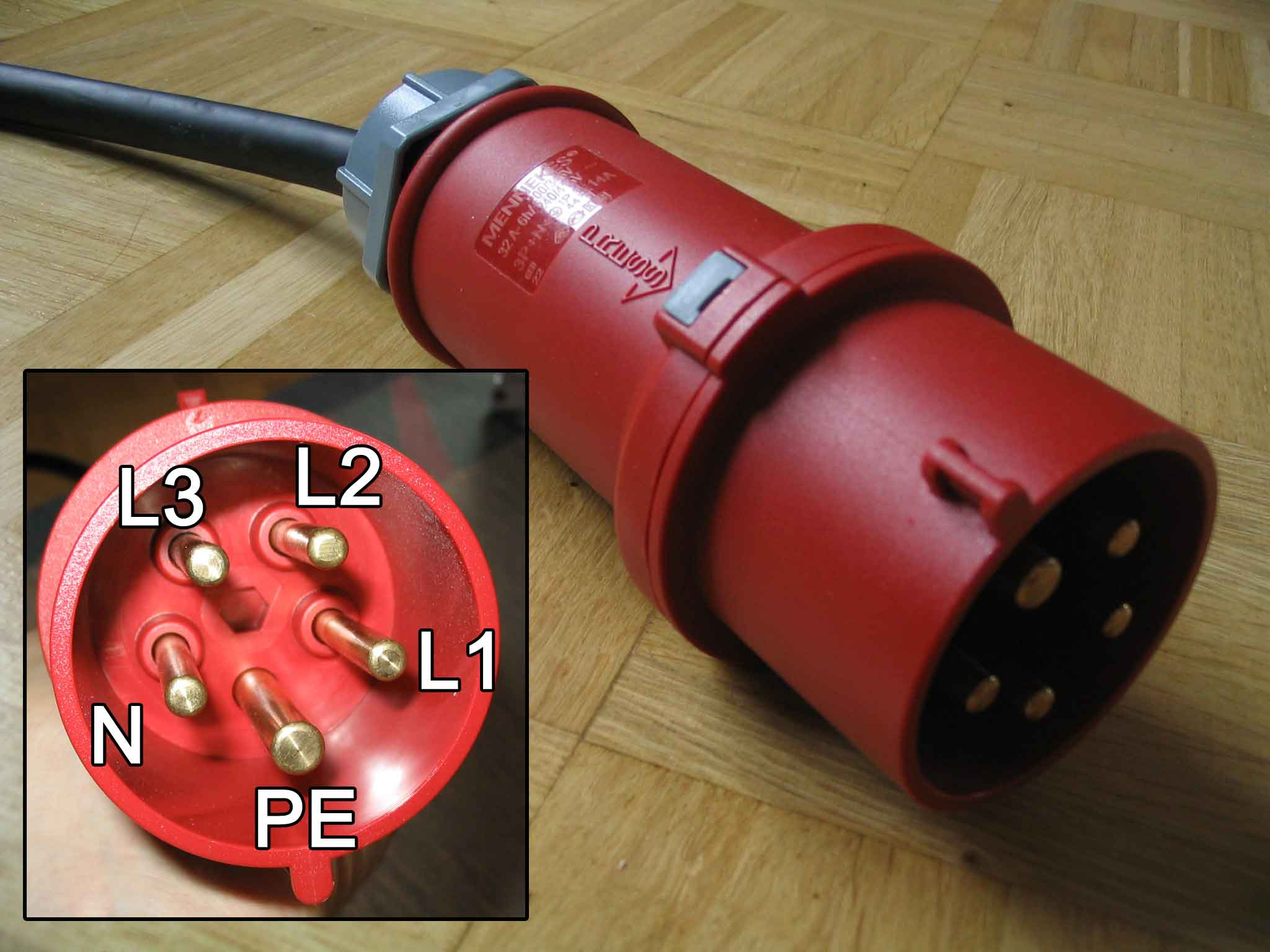
32 A 400 V 3P+N+E

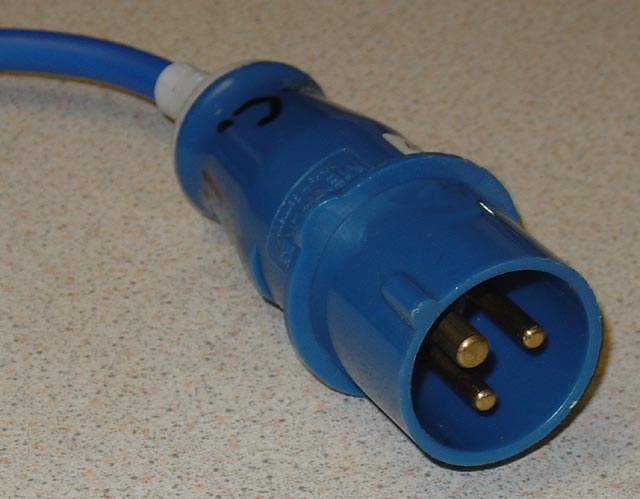
16 A P+N+E 230 V plug

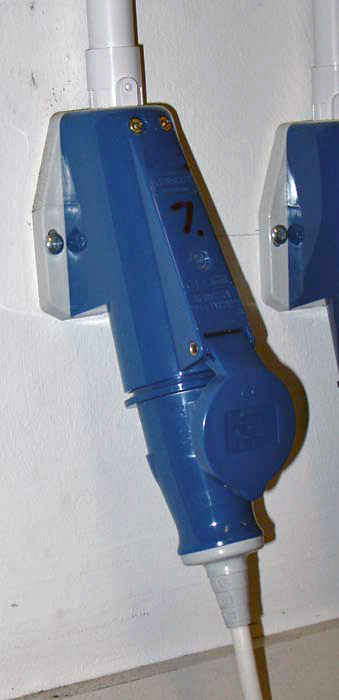
Mated 16 A plug and wall-mounted socket

=== IEC 60309 system ===
The most common range of heavy commercial and industrial connectors (particularly in Europe) are made to IEC 60309 (formerly IEC 309) and various standards based on it (including BS 4343 and BS EN 60309-2). These are often referred to in the UK as CEE industrial, CEEform or simply CEE plugs, or as "Commando connectors" (after the MK Commando brand name for these connectors).

The maximum voltage rating of IEC 60309 connectors is 1000 V DC or AC; the maximum current rating is 800 A; and the maximum frequency 500 Hz. Plugs are available in P+N+E (unbalanced single phase with neutral), 2P+E (balanced single phase), 3P+E (3 phase without neutral), and 3P+N+E (three phase with neutral). Current ratings available include 16 A, 32 A, 63 A, 125 A and 200 A.

Voltage rating and other characteristics are represented by a colour code (in three-phase plugs the stated voltage is the phase-phase voltage, not the phase-neutral voltage). Plugs have the earth pin of a larger diameter than the others, and located in different places depending on the voltage rating, making it impossible to mate, for instance, a blue plug with a yellow socket. Since the different current ratings have different overall sizes, it is also not possible to mate different pin configurations or current ratings. For example, a 16 A 3P+E 400 V plug will not mate with a 16 A 3P+N+E 400 V socket and a 16 A P+N+E 230 V plug will not mate with a 32 A P+N+E 230 V socket.

Yellow 2P+E, blue P+N+E, yellow 3P+E, red 3P+E, and red 3P+N+E are by far the most common arrangements. Blue P+N+E sockets (generally 16 A, although 32 A is becoming more common) are used as standard by British and Danish campsites and yacht marinas to provide 240 V domestic mains power to frame-tents, trailer-tents, caravans, and boats; they are also used elsewhere in Europe for the same purpose, though in some countries the local domestic plug is also widely used. Static caravans generally use the similar 32 A version because of the requirement to power electrical cooking and heating appliances. The blue P+N+E 16 A version carrying 240 V is also used in shopping malls and their peripherals to power 'temporary' stalls not incorporated within a lock-up shop, there is also use in domestic gardens within Britain to power garden equipment, barbecues, and temporary lighting. The yellow 2P+E 16 A version carrying 115 V is used extensively on the London Underground railway system to power temporary usage of heavy-duty fans; it is also frequently used by tradesmen within the UK, built into a portable transformer box that is powered from a standard 13 A 240 V mains supply, to run heavy-duty power-tools designed to operate at 115 V.

A small number of marinas provide 230 V single-phase power through a red three-phase connector (breaking the relevant standards in the process). This goes some way to ensuring that only boats that have paid the required fee (and thus obtained an appropriately made-up adaptor cable) are able to use the electricity.

For more detailed information, see the main article IEC 60309.

Throughout Europe, a common use of those industrial power connectors is in the entertainment and broadcast industries.

In this industry the above-mentioned IEC 60309 connectors are referred to as CEEform (or just CEE) connectors. 230 V single-phase (blue) and 400 V three-phase (red) connectors between 16 A and 125 A ratings are used.

Where more current carrying capacity is required, such as between generator sets and distribution boards, VEAM Powerlocks or Cam-Loks may be used. These connectors are single pole so five are required to accommodate all three phases, neutral and ground. Powerlocks have a rating of 400 A or 660 A at 1 kV. Cam-Lok E1016 Series are rated at 600 V 400 A.

Powerlocks are identified with the IEC 60446 harmonized colour code, they are also annotated as follows:

- Brown, L1
- Black, L2
- Grey, L3
- Blue, N
- Green, Earth

Cam-Loks are also available in these colours.

Where it is necessary to run separate feeds through multicable, the Socapex 19-pin connector is often encountered on theatre and studio lighting rigs.

== Europe ==
Most of Europe use the common IEC 60309 type, but there are some exceptions:

=== UK: Lewden plugs ===
Lewden plugs and sockets are metal bodied waterproof plugs and sockets made by Lewden. The pin arrangements of the smaller single phase varieties are the same as BS 1363 and BS 546 plugs and sockets. These plugs and sockets will mate with normal plugs and sockets of the same pin arrangement but they are only waterproof when a Lewden plug is used in a Lewden socket and the screw ring is properly tightened (sockets have a metal cover that screws on to waterproof them when not in use).

=== UK: BS 196 ===
In 1930, the BS 196 standard for industrial plugs and sockets was introduced. The plugs are available in 5 A, 15 A and 30 A variants, with various configurations of keyways and pins to cater for different voltages. BS 196 plugs have now been superseded by BS 4343 (CEE type) connectors in most modern applications.

=== Sweden, Germany and Netherlands: Perilex plugs ===
Perilex plugs and sockets are 5-pin 3-phase connectors. The system provides 400 V 3P+N+PE and exists in 16 A and 25 A versions. In Sweden, the 16 A is generally used for stoves and to some extent for other heating devices in kitchens. In the Netherlands, Perilex is also used to connect fans with wired speed control (Switched L2 and L3 pins), but fans may not use three phase power

=== Sweden: Semko 17 plugs ===
Semko 17 were 3/4-pin 3-phase connectors, with (4-pin) or without (3-pin) a neutral connector. Earth were provided via the shield. The connectors were available in different sizes, 16 A with rounded corners; 25 A and 63 A were rectangular. These connectors were used mainly in industrial and agricultural installations. Manufacturing and selling of Semko-17 connectors with metal shells was prohibited in 1989. A few years later manufacturing and selling of all Semko-17 connectors were prohibited. Existing connectors may be used but not by any employee (prohibited by "Arbetsmiljöverket"). The reason for the prohibition is that Semko-17 had several safety issues. The ground connection can become oxidized and when the shells are made of metal any ground fault goes right through the hands of a person connecting/disconnecting a male and a female cable connector (unless the person wears insulating gloves). Incorrect use of the ground connector as a neutral was not uncommon. Perhaps the worst issue is that in some connectors the ground screw could rust so severely that the ground wire comes loose and in the worst case make contact with a line (phase) wire nearby.

=== Switzerland: SN 441011 ===
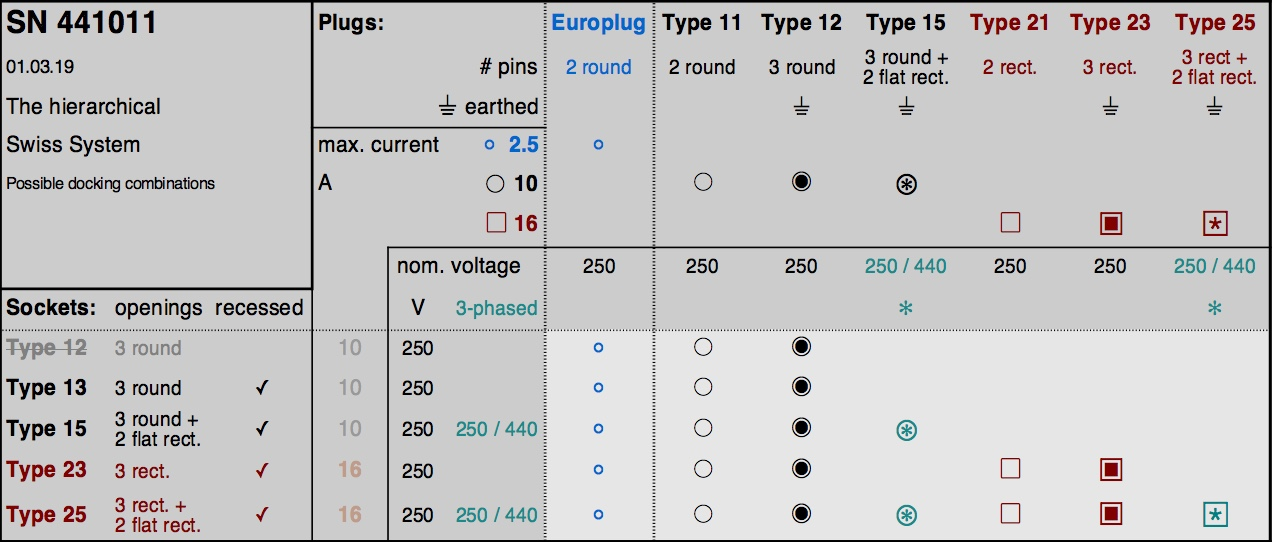
SEV 1011:2009, overview of the hierarchical Swiss System for household and similar purposes

The Swiss standard SN 441011 (until 2019 SEV 1011) Plugs and socket-outlets for household and similar purposes. defines a hierarchical system of plugs and sockets including both single and three phase connectors. Sockets will accept plugs with the same or fewer number of pins and the same or lower ratings. Single phase Swiss plugs and sockets are described in the main article SN 441011.

The type 15 plug and socket has 3 round pins of 4 mm diameter, plus 2 flat pins (for L2 and L3). It is designed for three phase applications and is rated at 10 A, 250 V/440 V. The socket will also accept types 11 and 12 plugs, and the Europlug.

The type 25 plug and socket has 3 rectangular pins, 4 mm x 5 mm, plus 2 flat pins (for L2 and L3). It is designed for three phase applications and is rated at 16 A, 250 V/440 V. The socket will accept types 11, 12, 21, and 23 single phase plugs, the Europlug, and types 15 and 25 three phase plugs.

Swiss multi-phased sockets

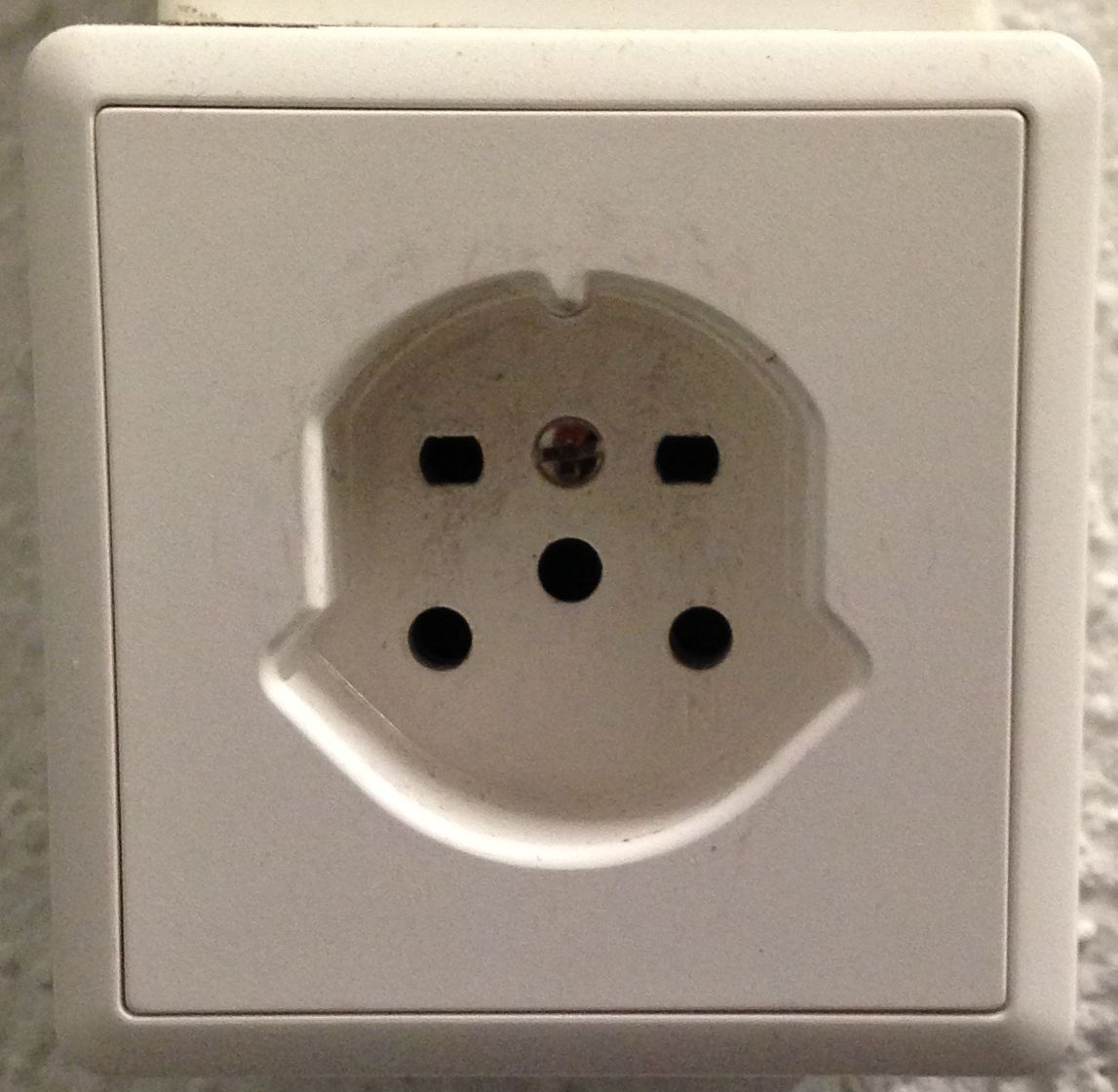
Type 15 socket (3-phase, 10 A)

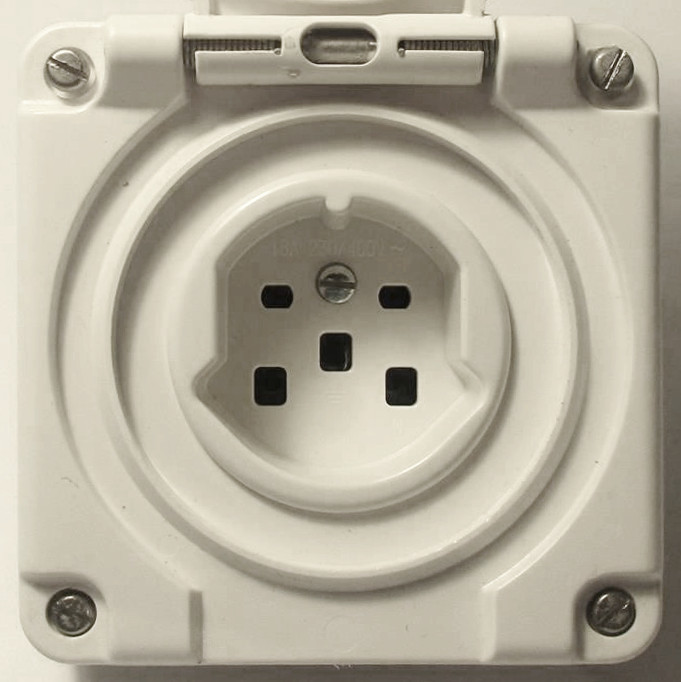
Type 25 socket (3-phase, 16 A)

=== Former Yugoslavia ===
This type of three phase plug and sockets are mainly used in households in former Yugoslavian countries, they are 5-pin 3-phase connectors, rated at 16 A, 380 V. Industrial 3-phase connectors are same as European IEC 60309.

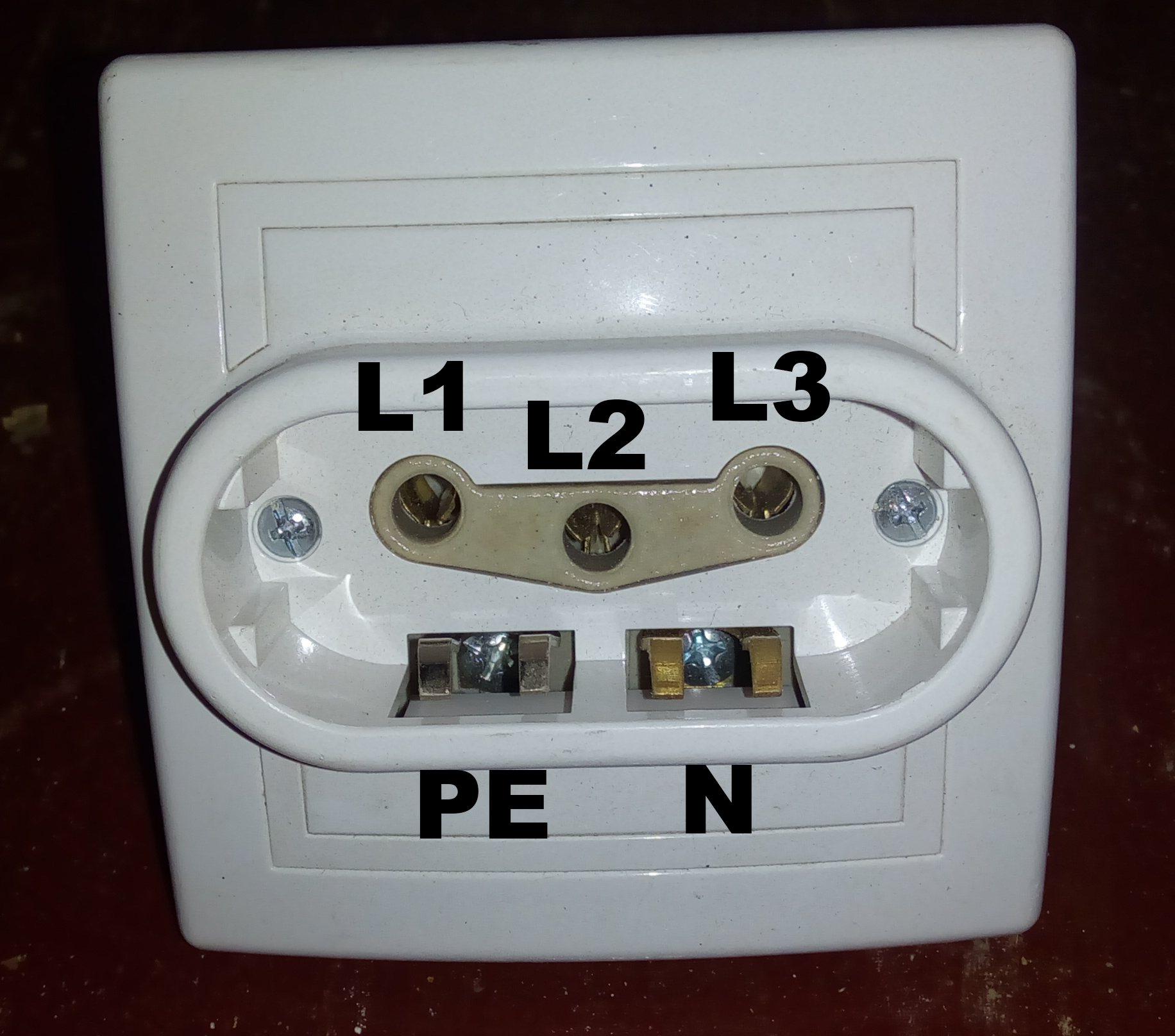
380 V Yugoslavian 5-pin 3-phase wall socket

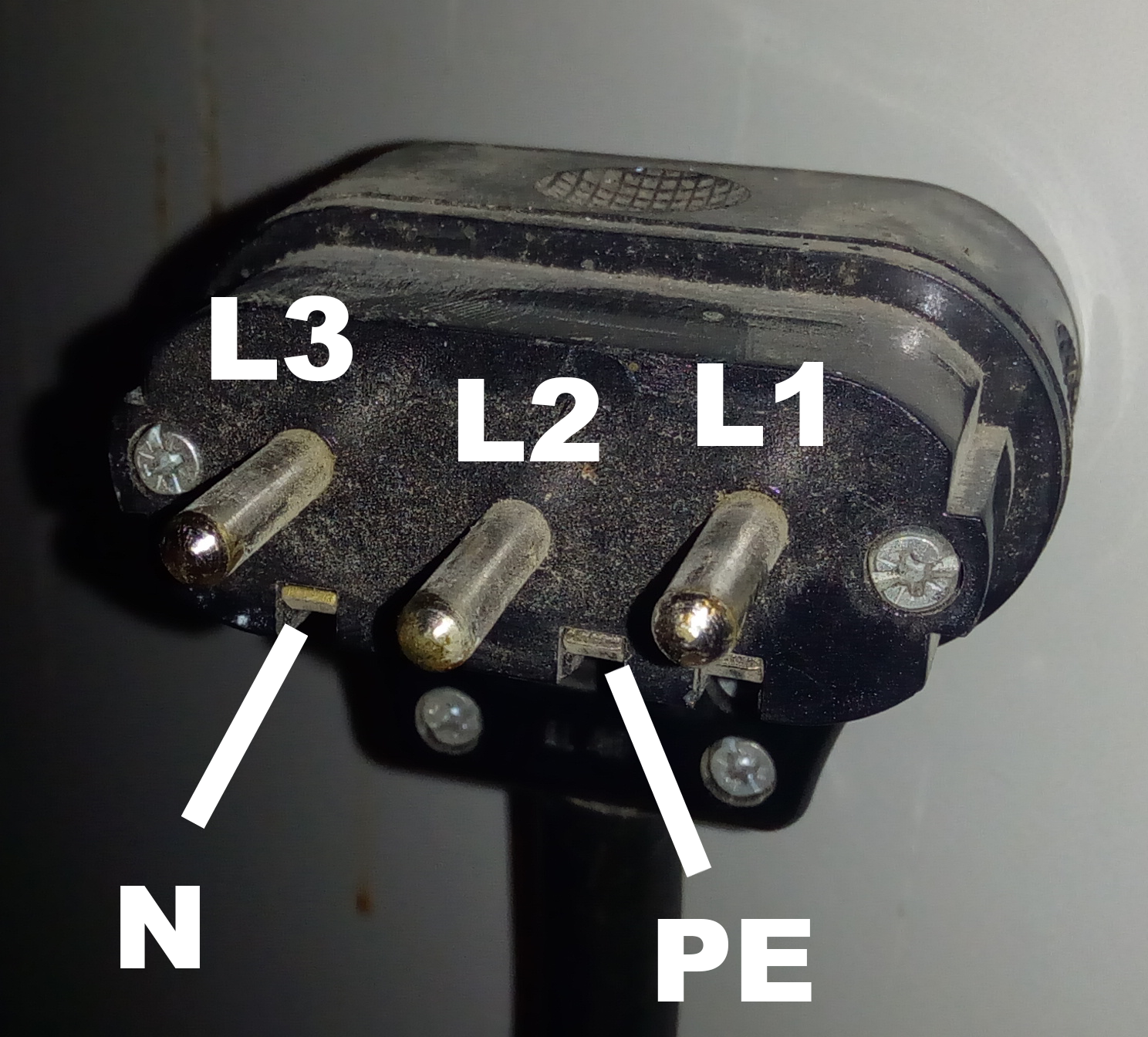
380 V Yugoslavian 5-pin 3-phase plug

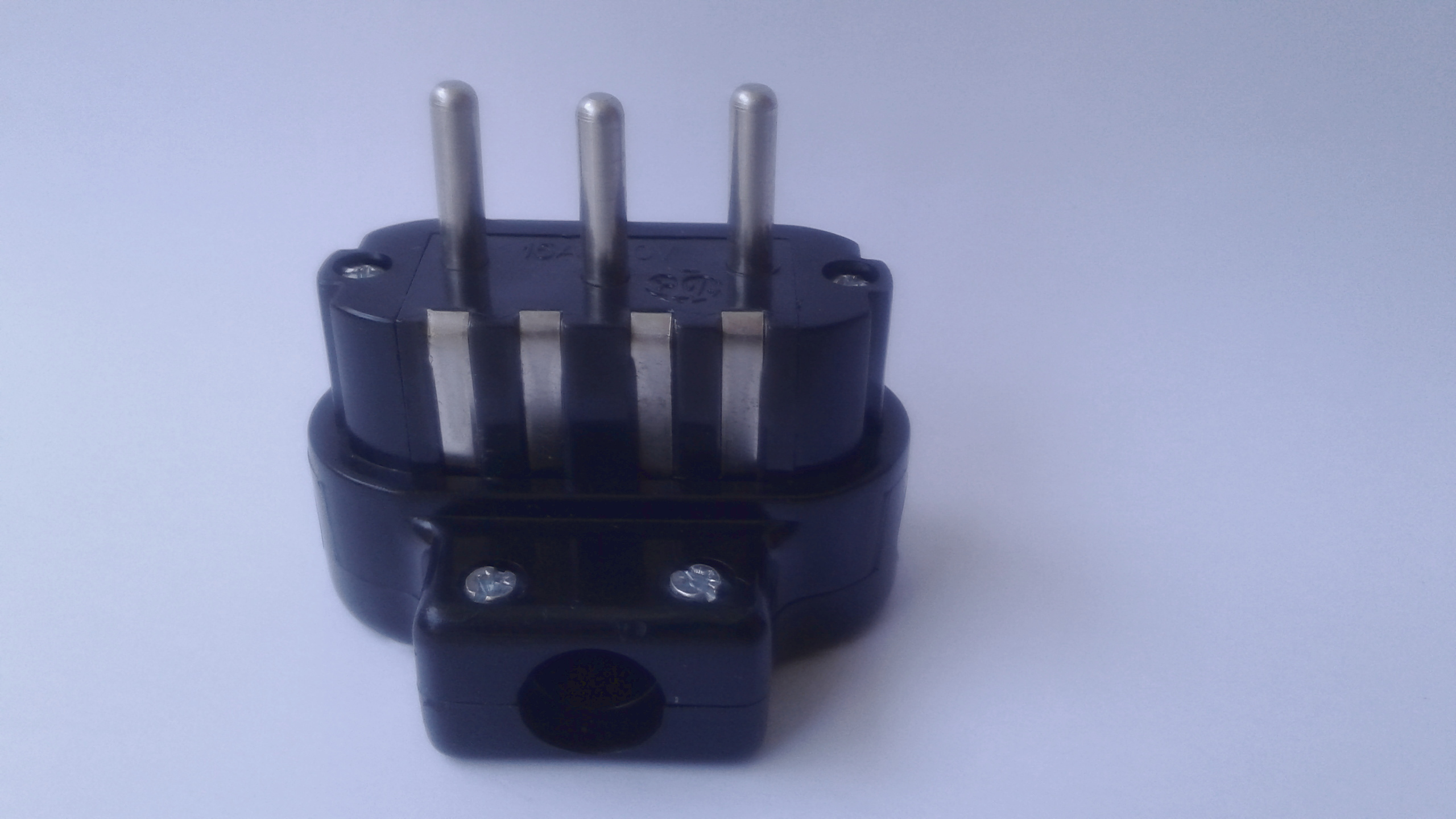
380 V Yugoslavian 5-pin 3-phase plug (bottom view)

== North America ==
=== Pin and sleeve ===
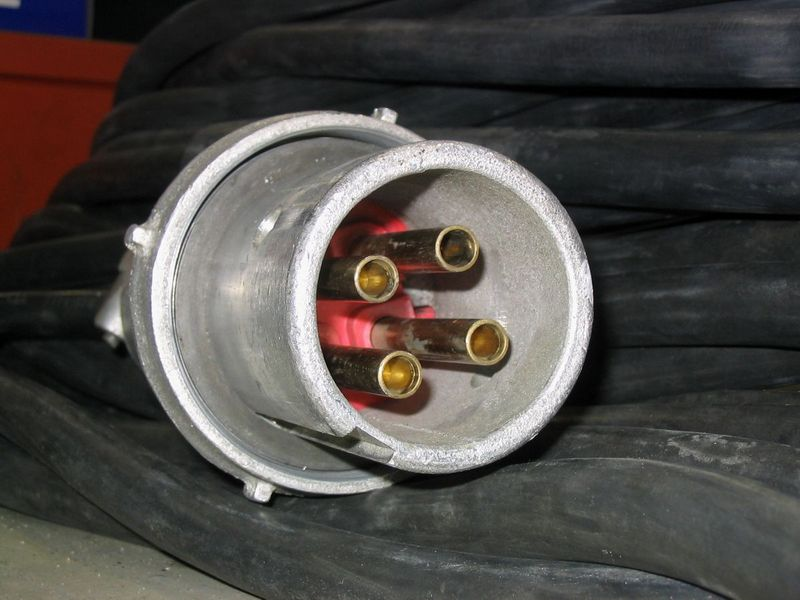
Pin and sleeve plug

Pin and sleeve connectors

In North America, there are two types of pin and sleeve products that are used, the common IEC 60309 type and the NEMA:

==== NEMA ====
Americans use pin and sleeve circular connectors. Current ratings are 30, 60, 100, 200, and 400 A. All are rated for voltages up to 250 V DC or 600 V AC. Contact arrangements are from 2 to 4 pins. There are two styles depending on the treatment of the ground. Style 1 grounds only on the shell. Style 2 uses one of the contacts as well as the shell, internally connected together. They are not strongly typed for specific circuits and voltages as the IEC 309 are. One insert rotation option is available to prevent mating of similar connectors with different voltages.

The contacts in the plug are simple cylinders (sleeves), while the pin contacts in the receptacle have the spring arrangement to hold contact pressure, the reverse of the IEC 60309 type connectors. All contacts are the same diameter. Originally metal construction was used, but now they are also made with plastic shells. Since only keying in the connector shell is used, and since the keys can be damaged in industrial use, it is possible to mis-match worn connectors.

=== NEMA connectors ===
NEMA devices are not exclusively industrial devices, and some types are found in nearly all buildings in the United States. "Industrial-grade" connectors are constructed to meet or exceed the requirements of more stringent industry testing standards, and are more heavily built to withstand damage than residential and light commercial connectors of the same type. Industrial devices may also be constructed to be dust or water-tight. NEMA wiring devices are made in current ratings from 15–60 A, and voltage ratings from 125–600 V.

There are two basic configurations of NEMA plug and socket: straight-blade and locking. Numbers prefixed by L are twist-lock, others are straight blade. Locking type connectors are found mostly in industrial applications and are not common in residential and light commercial use.

==== Twist-locking connectors ====
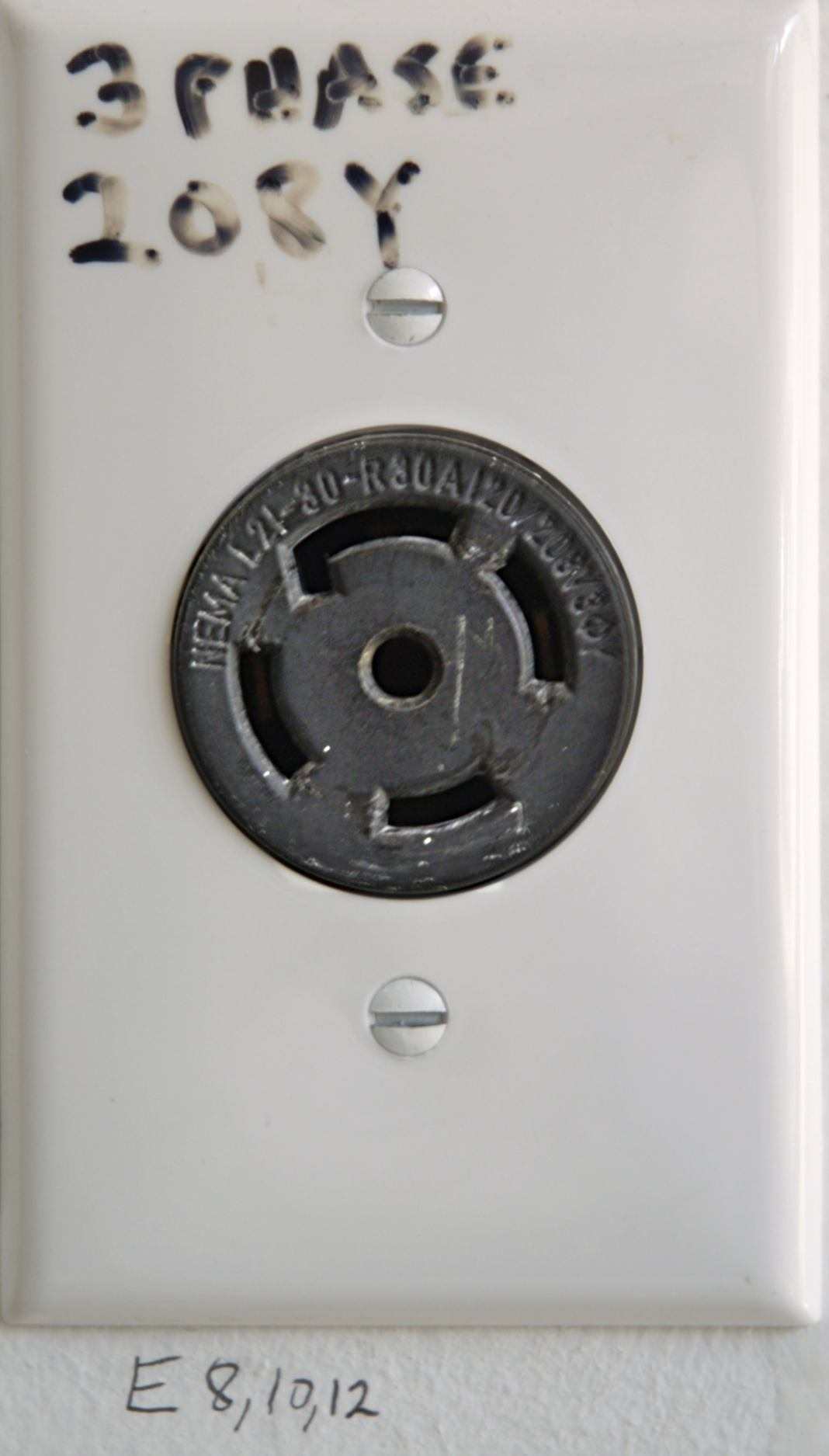
30 A 208Y/120 V L21-30 receptacle

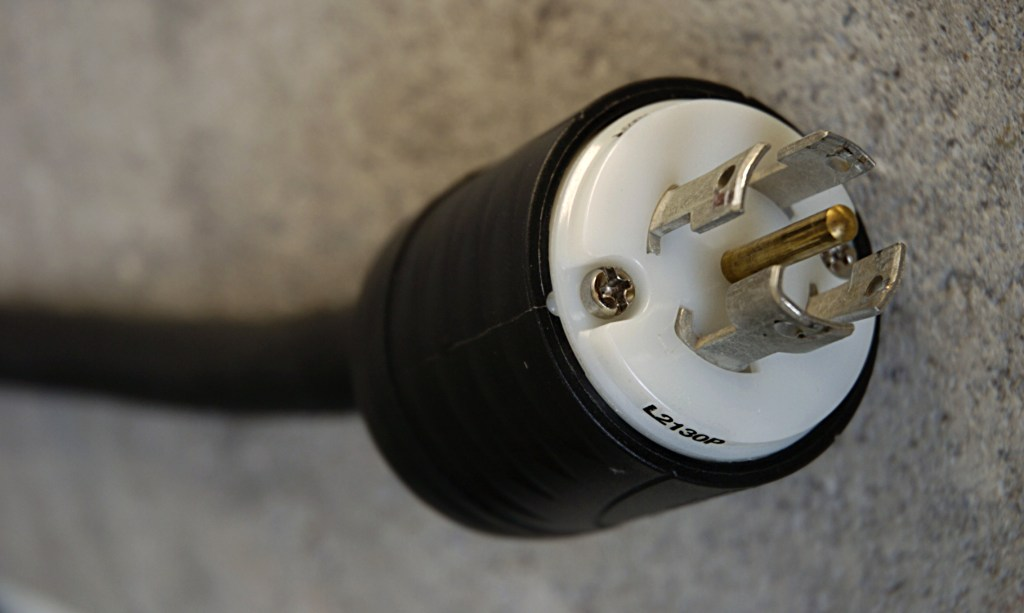
L21-30 plug

Twist-locking connectors were first invented by Harvey Hubbell III in 1938 and Twist-Lock remains a registered trademark of Hubbell Incorporated to this day, although the term tends to be used generically to refer to NEMA twist-locking connectors manufactured by any company. Twist-locking connectors all use curved blades that have shapes that conform to portions of the circumference of a circle. Once pushed into the receptacle, the plug is twisted and its now-rotated prongs latch into the receptacle. To unlatch the plug, the rotation is reversed. The locking coupling makes for a very reliable connection in commercial and industrial settings.

Like non-locking connectors, these come in a variety of standardized configurations and follow the same general naming scheme except that they all begin with an L for locking. The connector families are designed so that 120 V connectors, 208/240 V connectors, and various other, higher-voltage connectors can not be accidentally intermated.

=== Stage pin connectors ===
A stage pin connector. Note the GR denoting the longer ground pin, which is not quite in the center to prevent the plug being inserted upside down

A stage pin connector (SPC), or grounded stage pin (GSP), is a connector used primarily in the theatre industry for stage lighting applications in the United States. Stage pin connectors are generally used for conducting dimmed power from a dimmer to stage lighting instruments, although occasionally they can power other equipment.

The primary advantage of the stage pin connector over the NEMA 5-15 connector (commonly known as an Edison connector in the theatre industry) is its increased durability and resistance to damage due to its more robust construction and the ability to compensate for wear with a pin splitter. Having a distinct connector designated for dimmable power also helps prevent confusion of dimmed and non-dimmed circuits which could lead to equipment damage. Even the smallest stage pin connectors are rated for 20 A, which translates to 2.4 kW at 120 V, compared to the 15 A and 1.8 kW of the NEMA 5-15. In applications where cables are on the floor, the low profile of the connector allows for connections that are only slightly higher than the cables they connect.

=== California 50 A Connector ===
In North America for moderate current requirements the 50 A California-style connector, also known as CS6364 and CS6365, is commonly used. It features a twist-lock design with a metal sleeve full protecting the blades on the male connector and a center ground spike on the female connector to aid in centering.

California connectors are commonly used at outdoor events, shows and conventions and at construction sites. The connector gets its name from being developed as a safer connector during the early days of Hollywood film studios in California. The first high-current connectors used in the studios were stage pin (also referred to as "paddle plugs") used in theaters, which were not grounded. The California plug, however, is grounded by the outer steel shroud. This also helped protect the male contact pins from damage from the constant dragging of cables around a set throughout the day. The grounded shroud helps absorb the arc-flash if the connector is plugged or unplugged while energized. The original paddle plugs were known for dangerous arc-flashes, especially in the older DC-powered theaters in the early years of electrical stage lighting.

For example, a three phase plug which requires a neutral connection cannot be inserted into a socket outlet which does not provide for such a connection. However, a plug which does not require a neutral connection can be inserted into a socket outlet which provides such a connection, although the neutral connection would not be utilized in that situation.

For stage lighting use, a common plug is the 32-A 5-pin connector with a neutral pin. Motor loads that don't need the neutral use a four-pin connector. Larger requirements may use powerlock or camlock connectors. In the IT industry, the IEC 60309 system is sometimes used.

== Australia ==
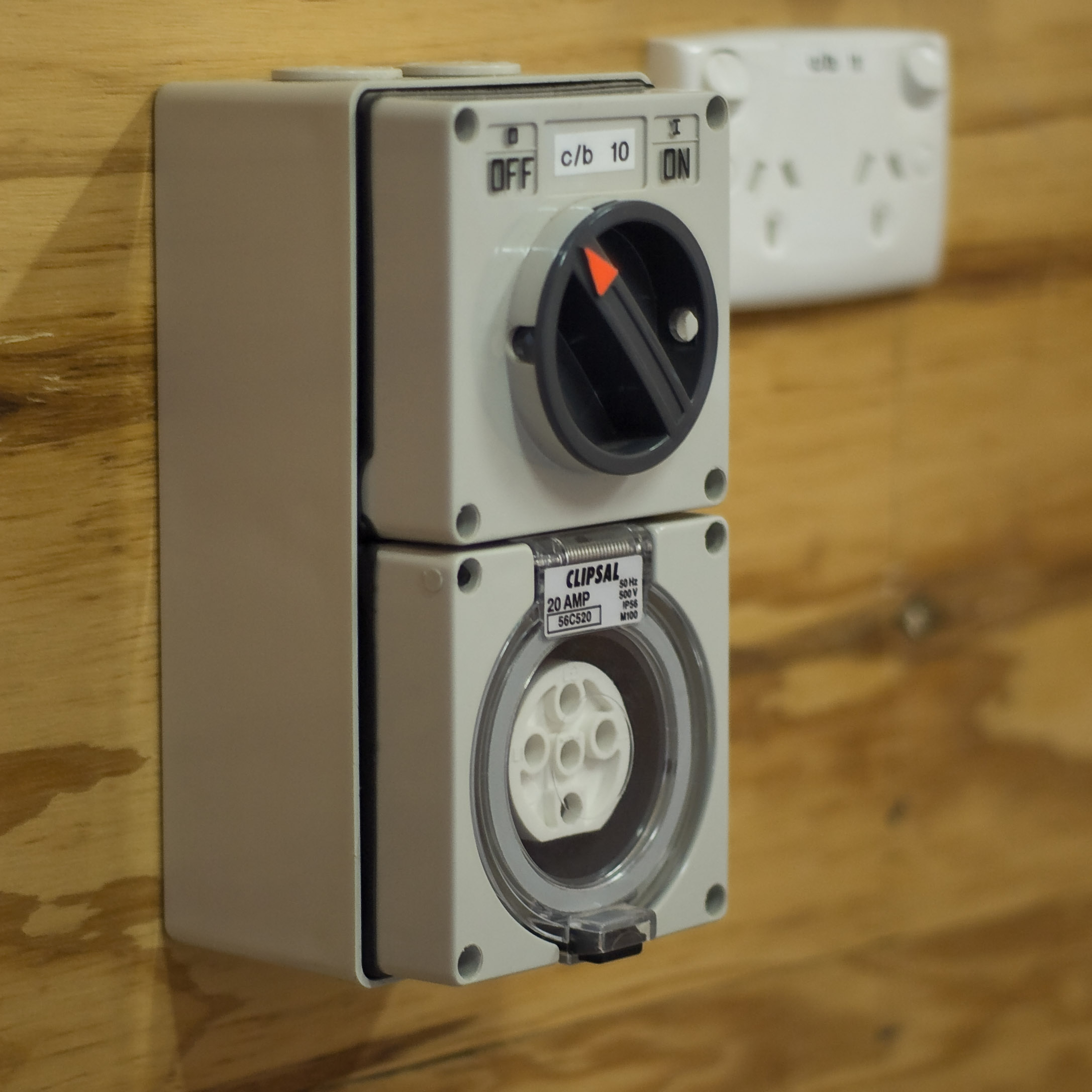
Australian 3-Phase socket outlet, with both Earth and Neutral connections, rated at 20 A, IP56. Single-phase dual 10 A Australian socket outlets are seen in the background.

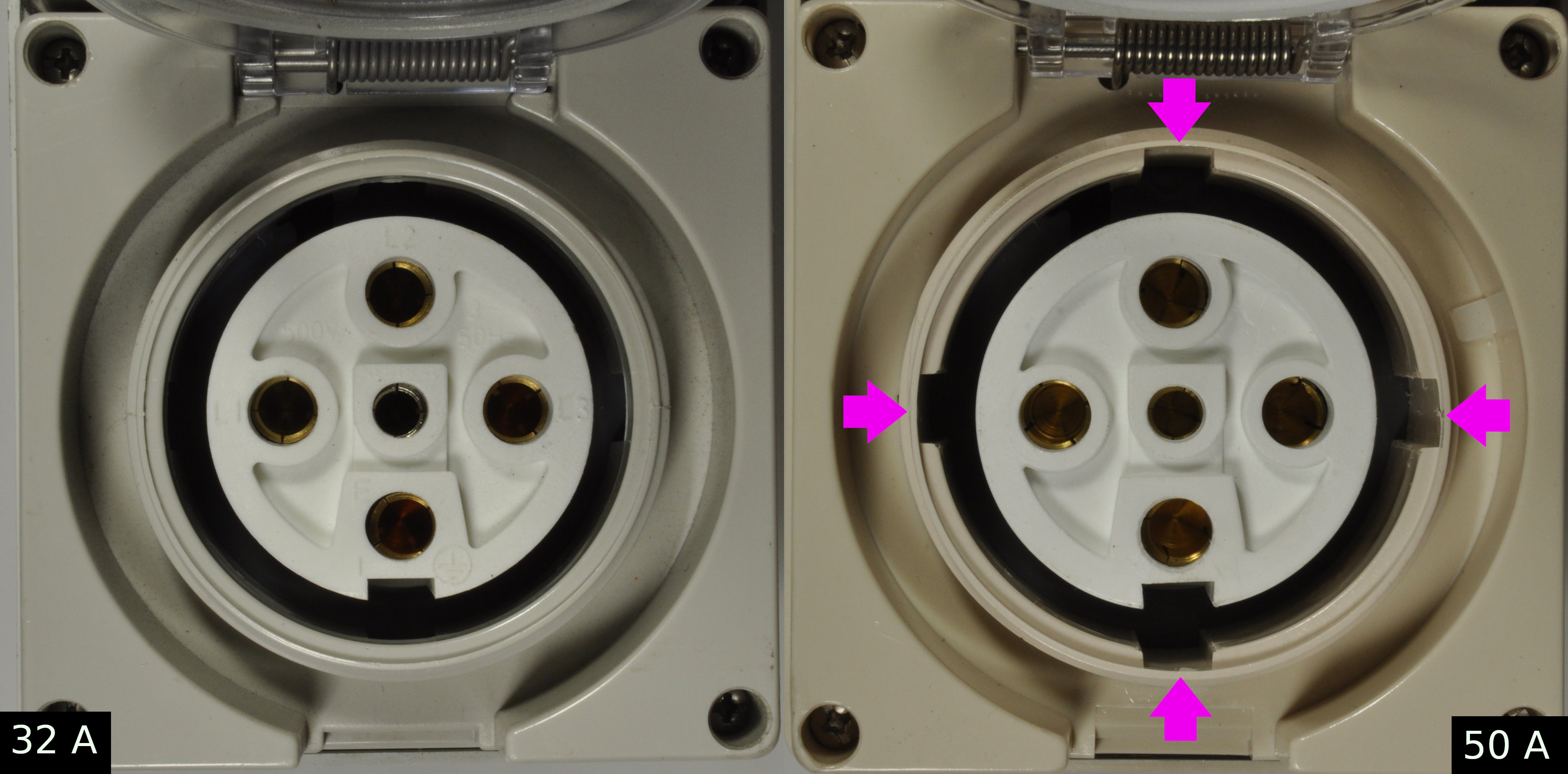
The arrows point to slots in the 50 A socket. The 50 A plug has plastic protrusions that fit through these slots, but block its insertion into the 32 A socket as it does not have these slots. The 32 A plug does not have any protrusions so can be inserted into either socket.

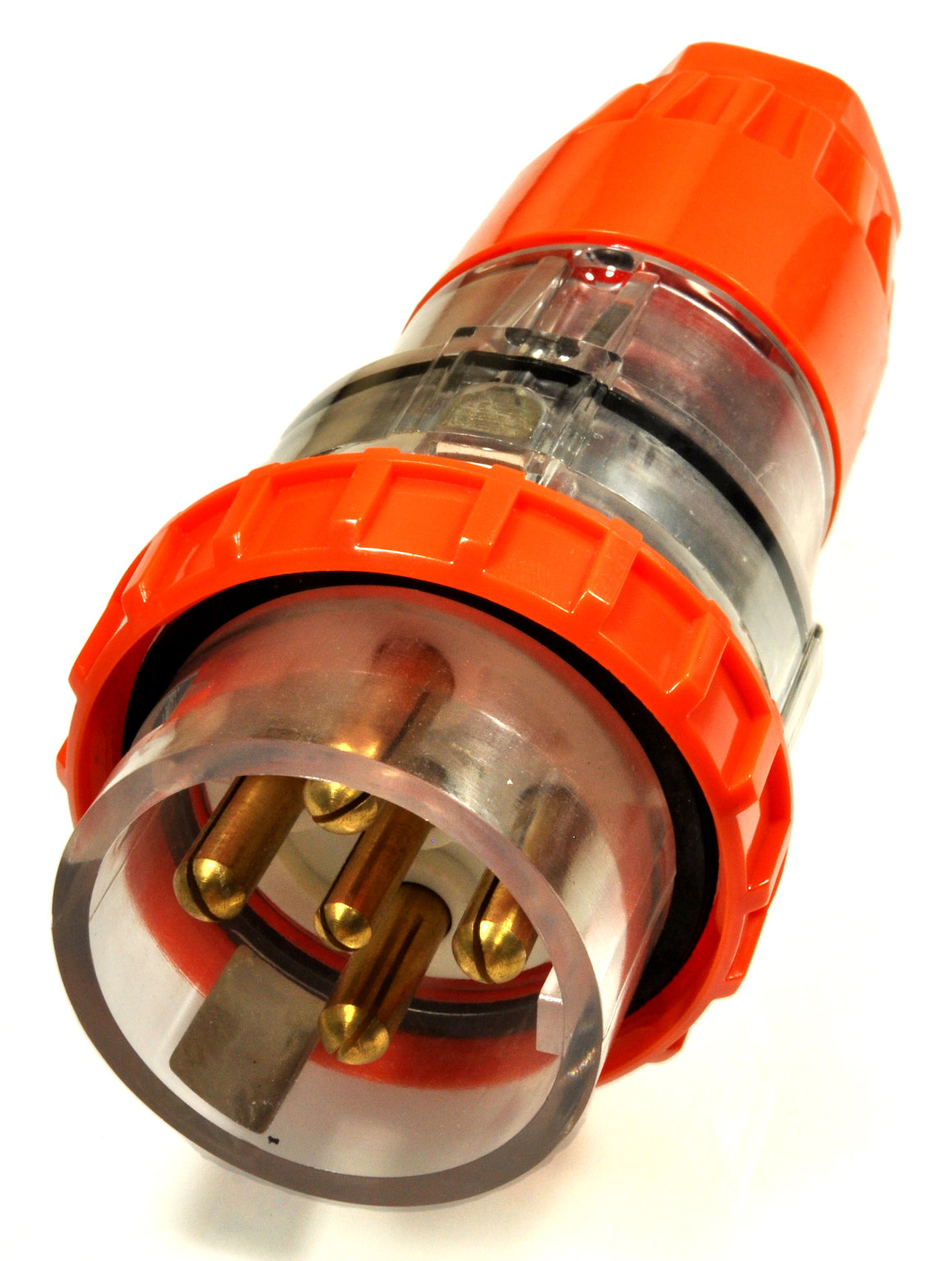
A 32-ampere 5-pin plug with a straight handle.

In Australia, New Zealand and many associated South Pacific island nations, the AS/NZS 3123 standard is used. In this series, multiple sizes of three-phase round-pin socket are standardized by current rating and neutral circuit. Each socket within a group accepts plugs in the same group up to its rating, but excludes plugs with a higher current rating, from a different group, or with a neutral pin (if there is not one in the socket). Multiphase plugs and sockets are rated at up to 500 V and all include an earth connection. These plugs and sockets are usually IP56 rated if fitted correctly. A screw collar helps hold plug and socket together.

In the single-phase standard AS/NZS 3112 used in residential environments, plugs of lower current rating may be inserted into single phase socket outlets of higher current rating but not vice versa. While this feature is somewhat reflected with multiphase sockets, it is further limited to only plugs within the same group. For example, there is one group that consists of 32 A, 40 A and 50 A connectors, and another group of 50 A, 63 A and 80 A connectors. The 32 A plug can be connected to any of the 32 A, 40 A or 50 A sockets in the first group, however it cannot be connected to any of the 50 A, 63 A or 80 A sockets in the second group. The standard notes that there are two different, incompatible 50 A connectors that are not interchangeable as they are physically different sizes.

Compatibility is grouped like this, such that larger sockets in one group can take the same plug or any smaller plugs from that group only:

Plugs			Sockets														
Group	Voltage	Current	110 V 1ph	250 V 1ph			415-500 V 3ph										
Group	Voltage	Current	Group 5/6	Group 1/2		Group 7/8	Group 3/4		Group 9/10			Group 11/12			Group 13/14		
Group	Voltage	Current	32 A	10 A	20 A	32 A	10 A	20 A	32 A	40 A	50 A	50 A	63 A	80 A	100 A	160 A	200 A
5/6	110 V 1ph	32 A	✔	✘	✘	✘	✘	✘	✘	✘	✘	✘	✘	✘	✘	✘	✘
1/2	250 V 1ph	10 A	✘	✔	✔	✘	✘	✘	✘	✘	✘	✘	✘	✘	✘	✘	✘
1/2	250 V 1ph	20 A	✘	✘	✔	✘	✘	✘	✘	✘	✘	✘	✘	✘	✘	✘	✘
7/8	250 V 1ph	32 A	✘	✘	✘	✔	✘	✘	✘	✘	✘	✘	✘	✘	✘	✘	✘
3/4	415-500 V 3ph	10 A	✘	✘	✘	✘	✔	✔	✘	✘	✘	✘	✘	✘	✘	✘	✘
3/4	415-500 V 3ph	20 A	✘	✘	✘	✘	✘	✔	✘	✘	✘	✘	✘	✘	✘	✘	✘
9/10	415-500 V 3ph	32 A	✘	✘	✘	✘	✘	✘	✔	✔	✔	✘	✘	✘	✘	✘	✘
9/10	415-500 V 3ph	40 A	✘	✘	✘	✘	✘	✘	✘	✔	✔	✘	✘	✘	✘	✘	✘
9/10	415-500 V 3ph	50 A	✘	✘	✘	✘	✘	✘	✘	✘	✔	✘	✘	✘	✘	✘	✘
11/12	415-500 V 3ph	50 A	✘	✘	✘	✘	✘	✘	✘	✘	✘	✔	✔	✔	✘	✘	✘
11/12	415-500 V 3ph	63 A	✘	✘	✘	✘	✘	✘	✘	✘	✘	✘	✔	✔	✘	✘	✘
11/12	415-500 V 3ph	80 A	✘	✘	✘	✘	✘	✘	✘	✘	✘	✘	✘	✔	✘	✘	✘
13/14	415-500 V 3ph	100 A	✘	✘	✘	✘	✘	✘	✘	✘	✘	✘	✘	✘	✔	✔	✔
13/14	415-500 V 3ph	160 A	✘	✘	✘	✘	✘	✘	✘	✘	✘	✘	✘	✘	✘	✔	✔
13/14	415-500 V 3ph	200 A	✘	✘	✘	✘	✘	✘	✘	✘	✘	✘	✘	✘	✘	✘	✔

Each of the three phase plugs and sockets are available as 4-pin (without neutral) or 5-pin (with neutral). A plug without a neutral pin can be inserted into a socket carrying neutral, but the reverse is not possible as the neutral pin blocks insertion into a socket that does not have a hole for the neutral conductor.

From this it can be seen that, for example, installing a 32 A, 250 V socket will only be compatible with a 32 A plug and it will not be possible to insert 10 A or 20 A plugs.

Within each size group, the plugs and sockets are keyed with certain "lugs" protruding on the outside of the plugs. Higher current plugs have more lugs to prevent them from being inserted into a lower current socket outlet, while still allowing them to be inserted into a socket outlet of the same size group rated for a higher current. For example, a 32 A 4-pin plug without neutral can plug into a 50 A 5-pin socket with neutral available.

However a 10 A 5-pin plug cannot fit a 32 A 5-pin socket, as the plugs are in different groups and not only are their diameters different, but the position of the conductors also varies by a few degrees (for example the group 7/8 32 A plug has its L and N pins at 9 o'clock and 3 o'clock, while the group 1/2 20 A plug has its L and N pins at 10 o'clock and 2 o'clock instead.)

There are also metal clad plugs and sockets that go up to 63 A ratings, at a significantly higher cost.

== See also ==
- Domestic AC power plugs and sockets
- Double insulated
- Electricity
- Electrical power
- Ground and neutral
- Protective multiple earthing
- SAE J1772 - Single phase AC and optional DC Electric Vehicle charging
- Type 2 connector - Three phase AC and optional DC Electric Vehicle charging
