= Camlock (electrical) =

High-current power connector

Camlocks

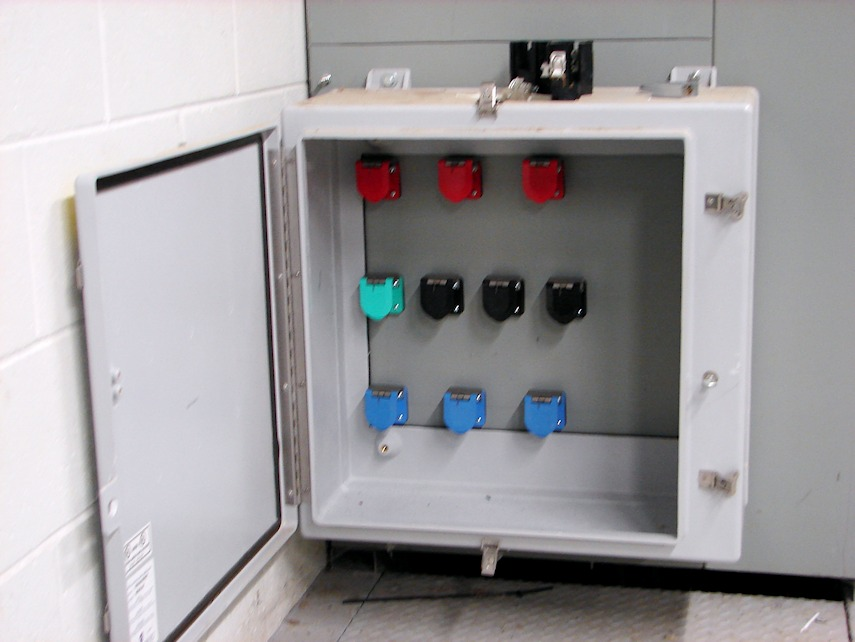
Camlock panel, without connections

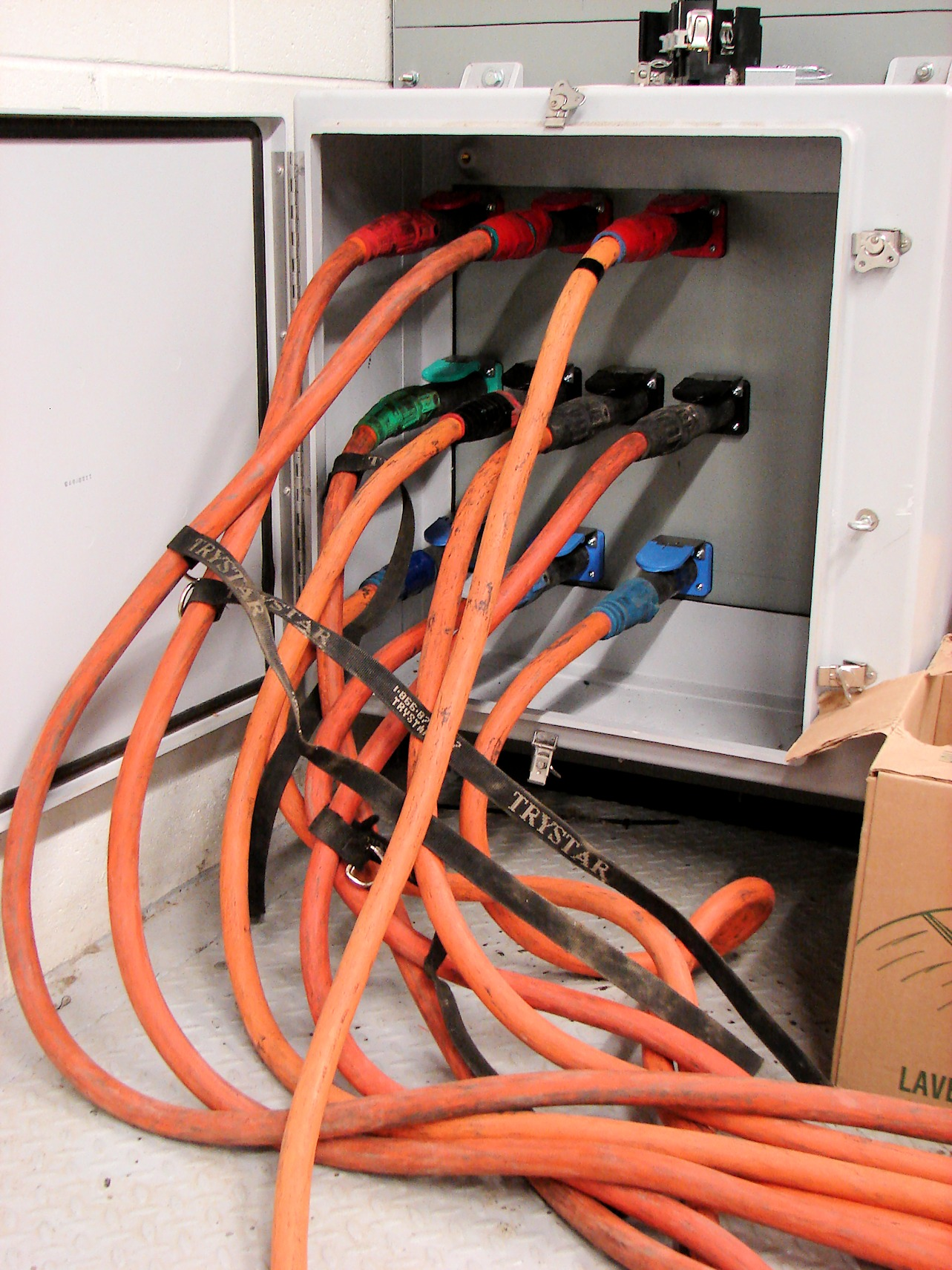
Camlock with connections made

A camlock or cam-lock is an interchangeable electrical connector, often used in temporary electrical power production and distribution, predominantly in North America. Originally a trade name as Cam-Lok, it is now a generic term. Each camlock connector carries a single phase, pole, or conductor; multiple camlock connectors will be used to make a complete electrical supply or circuit.

The most common form is the 16 series, rated at 400 amperes with 105 °C terminations. Also in common use is the 15 series (mini-cam), rated at 150 amperes. A larger version is made denoted as the 17 series with ratings up to 760 A. A ball nose version and a longer nose standard version exist—the latter is the most common. The early version original connector was hot-vulcanized to the cable body; later versions use dimensional pressure to exclude foreign material from the connector pin area. The tail of the connector insulator body is trimmable to fit the cable outer diameter.

Another version is the Posi-Lok, which features keyed, shrouded connectors, and panels with sequencing interlocks.

Camlock is generally used where temporary connections of 3-phase and/or more than 50 A are needed. Applications include connecting large temporary generators or load banks to distribution panels or building disconnects. Common scenarios include testing, emergencies, temporary special events, and traveling stage shows with large lighting and sound equipment. They are usually found only in professional environments, where connections are performed by qualified personnel.

== Color codes ==
Standards and industry conventions for phase and voltage exist, but may vary in practice, particularly when international companies and traveling productions are involved.

=== North America ===
The National Electrical Code (NEC) only specifies colors for ground and neutral: Green for the equipment grounding (safety) conductor (NEC Article 250.119), and white or grey for the neutral (grounded) conductor (NEC Article 200.6). These colors may not be used for any other purpose, nor may their purpose use a different color. No other colors are specified by the NEC for general power distribution.

Nonetheless, the following conventions exist:

120/208-volt wye and 240-volt delta
Colour	Use
Green	Equipment grounding conductor
White	Neutral (grounded conductor)
Black	Ø 1
Red	Ø 2
Blue	Ø 3

277/480-volt wye or 480-volt delta
Colour	Use
Green	Equipment grounding conductor
White	Neutral (grounded conductor, if used)
Brown	Ø 1
Orange	Ø 2
Yellow	Ø 3

=== United Kingdom ===
The UK system has two established camlock colour codes. The old and new colour codes are not compatible: Black was originally used to indicate neutral, and is now a phase colour; blue was used to denote a phase, and is now used to denote neutral. As the use of camlocks in the UK has been declining, it is very unlikely to find any matching the new colour codes.

UK Camlock colour codes
Colour		Use
Old	New	Use
Green	Green	Earth
Black	Blue	Neutral
Red	Brown	L1
Yellow	Black	L2
Blue	Grey	L3

== Gallery ==
Camlock power distribution

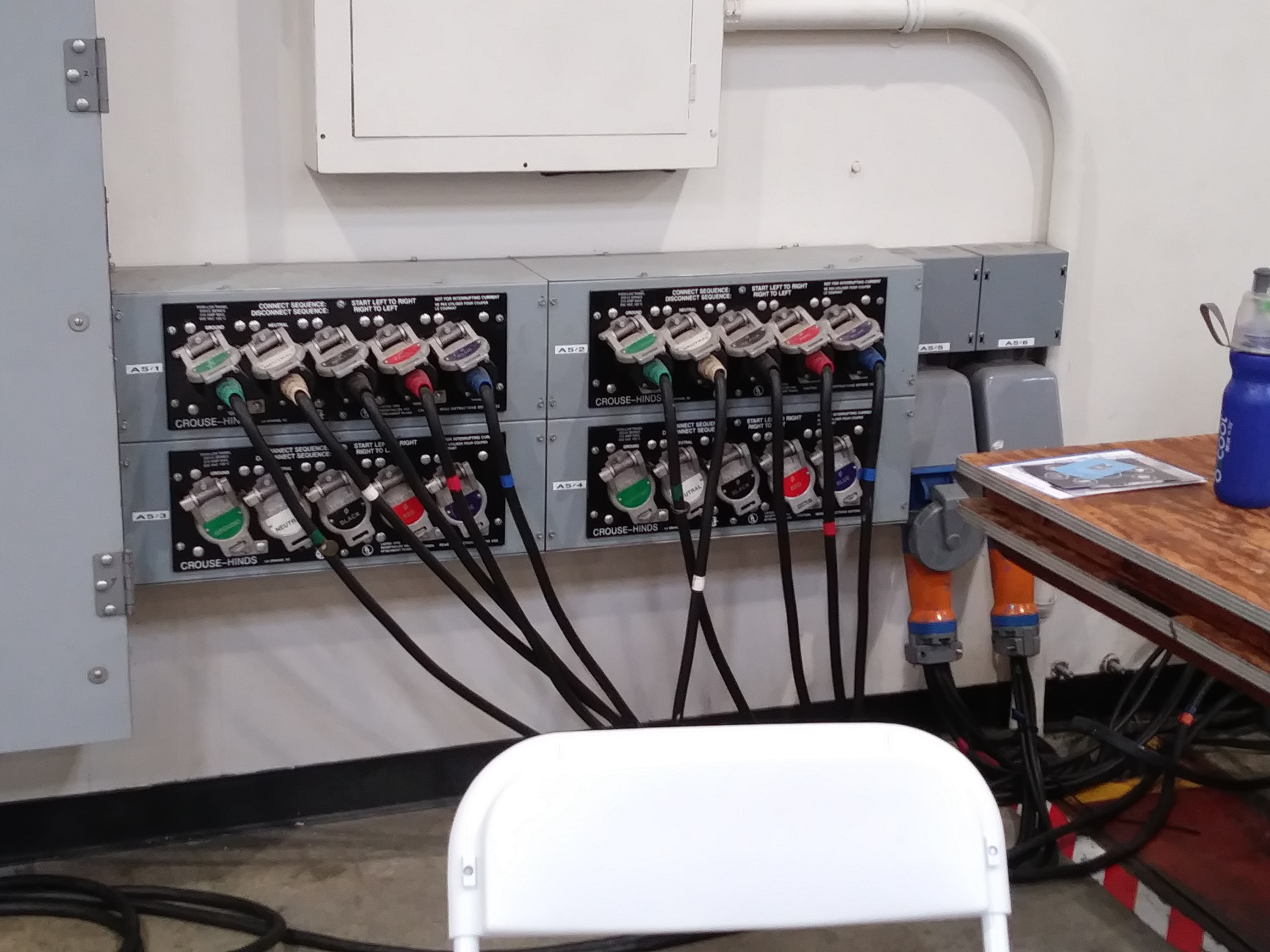
Four camlock power panels. Each panel has five camlock connectors — three AC phases, plus neutral and ground.

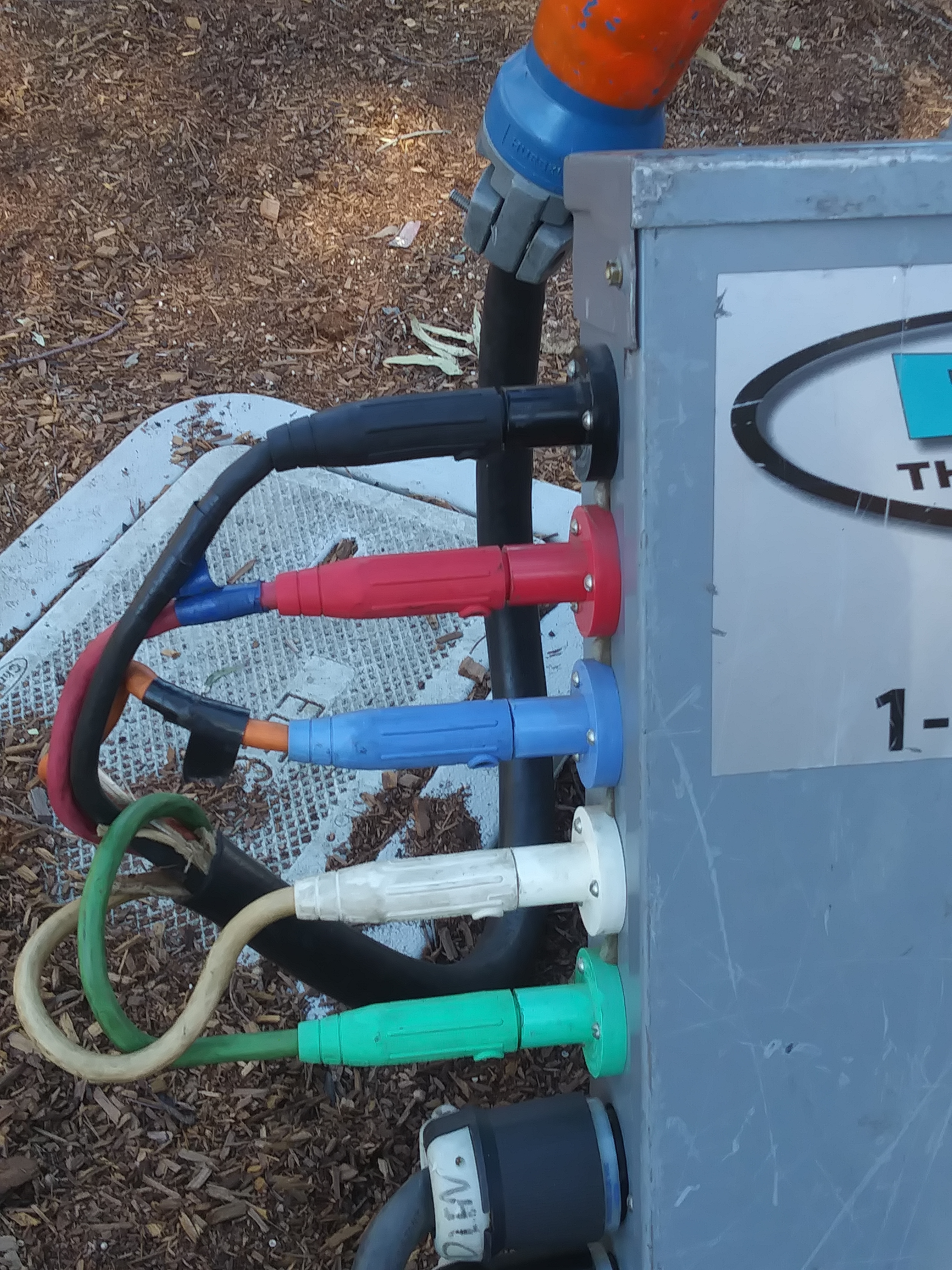
Closeup of camlock AC power connectors. In the US, typically, green is safety ground, white is neutral, and red, blue, and black are "hot" phases.

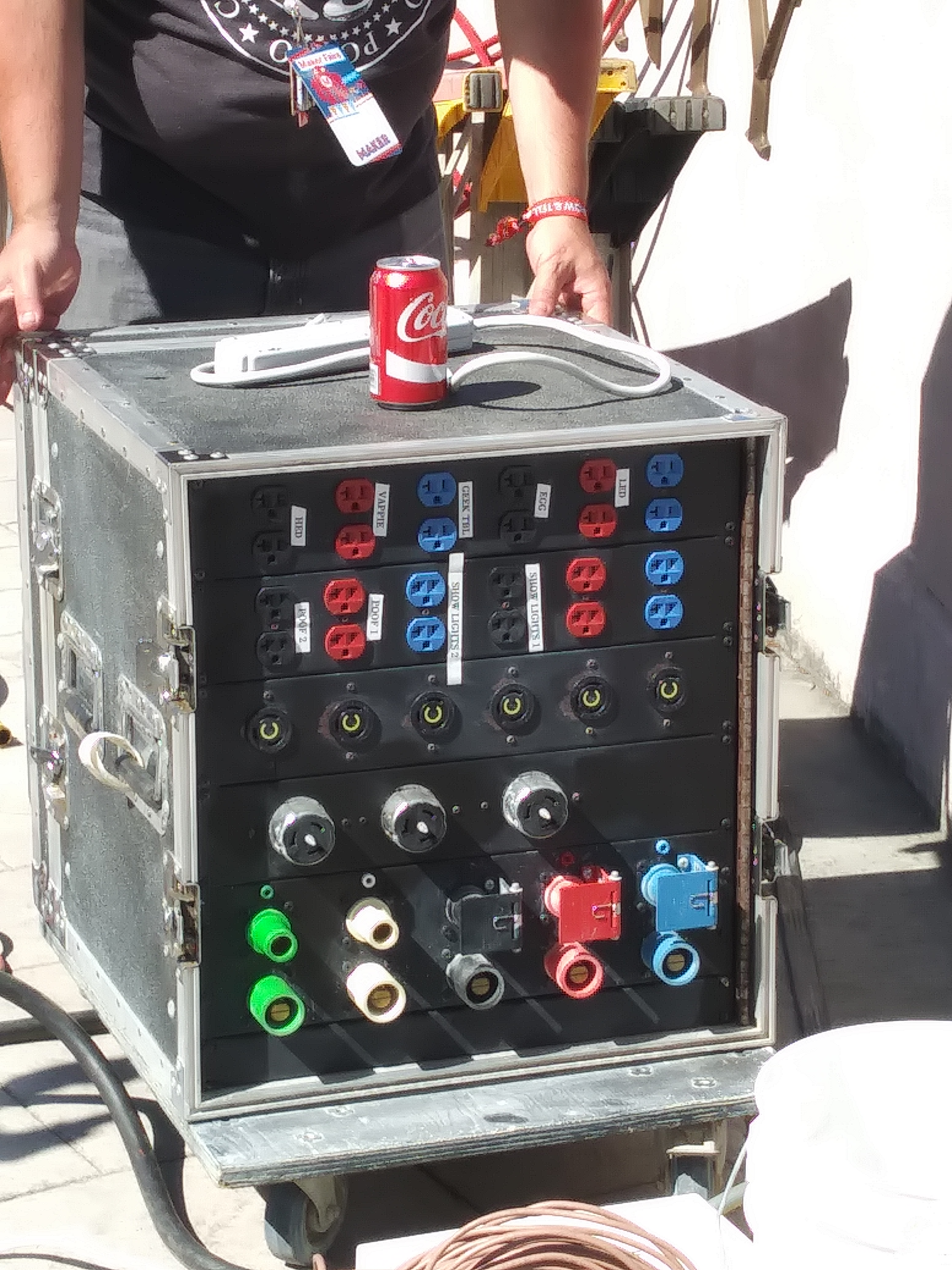
Distribution rack with camlock connectors at the bottom. The NEMA 5-20R outlets at the top are color coded to match the phase legs of the supply.

== See also ==
- Powerlock
- IEC 60309
- Industrial and multiphase power plugs and sockets
