= IEC 60446 =

Former international standard

The international standard IEC 60446 Basic and safety principles for man-machine interface, marking and identification - Identification of equipment terminals, conductor terminations and conductors was a standard published by the International Electrotechnical Commission (IEC) that defined basic safety principles for identifying electrical conductors by colours or numerals, for example in electricity distribution wiring. The standard has been withdrawn; the fourth edition (IEC 60446:2007) was merged in 2010 into the fifth edition of IEC 60445 along with the fourth edition, IEC 60445:2006.

== Permitted colours ==
The standard permits the following colours for identifying conductors:

- Black
- Brown
- Red
- Orange
- Yellow
- Green
- Blue
- Violet
- Grey
- White
- Pink
- Turquoise

The colours green and yellow on their own are only permitted where confusion with the colouring of the green/yellow protective conductor is unlikely. Combinations of the above colours are permitted, but green and yellow should not be used in any of these combinations other than as green/yellow for the protective conductor.

== Use of colours ==
=== Neutral or mid-point conductor ===
If a circuit includes a neutral or midpoint conductor, then it should be identified by a blue colour (preferably light blue ). Light blue is the colour used to identify intrinsically safe conductors, and must not be used for any other type of conductor.

=== AC phase conductors ===
The preferred colours for AC phase conductors are:

- L1: Brown
- L2: Black
- L3: Grey

For a single AC phase: brown

=== Protective conductor ===
The colour combination green/yellow is always and exclusively used to identify the protective conductor. On any 15 mm length of the conductor, one of these two colours should cover between 30% and 70% of the area and the other the remaining area.

=== Protective earth and neutral (PEN) conductor ===
Insulated PEN conductors (combined protective earth + neutral in TN–C systems) should be marked:

- either green/yellow along their entire length with light blue markings at their ends,
- or light blue along their entire length with green/yellow markings at the ends.

The cable must have a cross sectional area of 16 mm^{2} (5 AWG) or greater.

=== United States, Canada and Japan ===
The three countries United States, Canada and Japan are mentioned in a note in the standard for using different colours:

- White or natural grey for mid-wire or neutral conductor (instead of light blue )
- Green for the protective conductor (instead of green/yellow )

=== United Kingdom ===
British Standard BS 7671:2001 Amendment No 2:2004 adopted the IEC 60446 colours for fixed wiring in the United Kingdom , with the extension that grey can also be used for line conductors, such that three colours are available for three-phase installations. This extension is expected to be adopted across Europe and may even find its way into a future revision of IEC 60446.

== Marking ==
Where conductors are in addition identified by letters and numbers, then:

- letters to be used come from Latin character set,
- numbers must be written in Arabic numerals, digits 6 and 9 must be underlined (6 and 9),
- and a few symbols like + and − can be used.

Green-and-yellow conductors must not be marked.

Examples: L1, L2, L3, N, L+, L−, M, 35, 16
